= Matti Turkia =

Finnish politician (1871–1946)

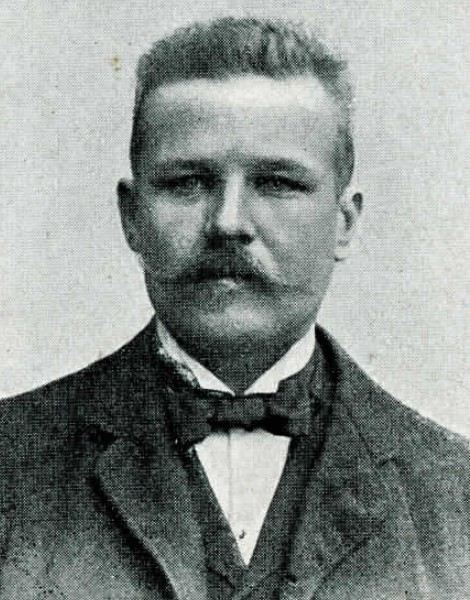

Member of the Parliament of Finland
- In office 21 October 1930 – 5 April 1945
- Constituency: Uusimaa Province
- In office 2 February 1914 – 3 April 1917
- Constituency: Viipuri Province West
- In office 22 May 1907 – 31 May 1909
- Constituency: Viipuri Province West

Secretary of the Social Democratic Party
- In office 1906–1918
- Preceded by: Yrjö Sirola
- Succeeded by: Taavi Tainio

Personal details
- Born: 26 February 1871 Viipuri municipality, Russian Empire
- Died: 10 January 1946 (aged 74) Helsinki, Finland
- Party: Social Democratic Party of Finland
- Occupation: Newspaper editor

Matti Turkia (26 February 1871 – 10 January 1946) was a Finnish newspaper editor, politician and member of the Parliament of Finland, the national legislature of Finland. A member of the Social Democratic Party (SDP), he represented Uusimaa Province between October 1930 and April 1945. He had previously represented Viipuri Province West from May 1907 to May 1909 and from February 1914 to April 1917. He was secretary of the SDP from 1906 to 1918.

Turkia was a member of the revolutionary Finnish People's Delegation during the Finnish Civil War in 1918. Following the Red defeat, he lived in exile in Soviet Russia and Sweden. He returned to Finland in 1927 and was imprisoned before receiving a presidential pardon.

== Early life ==
Turkia was born on 26 February 1871 in Viipuri municipality in the south-east of the Grand Duchy of Finland. He was the son of crofter Esaias Turkia and Helena Kristiina Pekkala. The family moved to Halla near Kotka where Esaias Turkia worked in the local sawmill. After attending public school, Turkia, aged 12, started working at the Halla sawmill in 1883.

Turkia became attracted to socialism after witnessing the poor working conditions at the Halla sawmill. He joined the Finnish Labour Party in 1895 and was involved in organising a strike at the sawmil in 1898. The mill owners fired the strike organisers and conspired with other employers in the Kotka region to blacklist them. Despite this, and the use of strikebreakers, the strikers were successful in having their demands met. Child labour at the mill was discontinued, the working day was reduced by two hours from 13½ hours to 11½ hours and wages were increased by up to 50%. The mill owners did not, however, reinstate Turkia, whom they considered to be a radical.

Between 1898 and 1901, Turkia worked in more than 30 different places in Finland, including a sawmill and as a woodworker. He was a machinist at a carpentry factory in Hietalahti, Helsinki between 1901 and 1903.

== Activism ==
By 1904 Turkia had established a workers organisation that was procuring weapons, distributing banned literature, organising anti-Russian assassinations and assisting Russian revolutionaries. The group had 5,000 members by 1905 and was credited with the assassination of Russian gendarmerie Lieutenant Colonel Vladimir Kramarenko. Turkia also traveled around Finland establishing local activist organisations. In this context, he was happy to work with bourgeoisie activists.

Turkia became a supporter of the temperance movement after witnessing the effects of alcohol on workers. He was the Kotka representative at the 1899 drinking strike meeting in Uusikaupunki. It was there that he met Selma Parkkisen (1875–1943), the representative from Helsinki. Turkia and Parkkisen married in 1900. They had three children: Anna (b. 1902), Aune (b. 1905) and Aino (Salo) (b. 1906).

== Journalism and politics ==
Turkia started writing articles for magazines in 1895. He was editor of Itä-Suomen Työmies in 1901. He was a collector of notices for Työmieen, Velikulta, Helsingin Sanomat and Kylväjä (1903–1904). He was editor of the Kansan Lehti in Tampere (1905) and Eteenpäin magazine in Kotka (1905–1906).

In 1906 Turkia was elected secretary of the Social Democratic Party (SDP), a position he held until 1918. He came under pressure at the 1909 SDP conference following the embezzlement of party funds by treasurer Emil Perttilä, who had fled to Cape Town. At the 1911 SDP conference, Otto Wille Kuusinen criticised Turkia for the declining party membership. Turkia wanted to resign but continued in the role as neither Kuusinen nor Oskari Tokoi wanted the job. A similar thing happened two years later. Turkia was elected to the Parliament of Finland at the 1907 parliamentary election. He was re-elected at the 1908 and 1913 parliamentary elections.

== Civil war and exile ==
In May 1917 Turkia met Vladimir Lenin, who promised to support Finnish independence. Turkia, together with Edvard Gylling and K. H. Wiik, had argued against revolution but considered it inevitable. By the autumn of 1917, Turkia was advocating the establishment of a workers' guard as he considered the police reserves to be a capitalist guard. He was against calling the workers' guard the Red Guard as it would alarm the public, and wanted the guards armed. He was commander-in-chief of the guards in October/November 1917 and during the general strike.

Following the Finnish Revolution, Turkia resigned as party secretary and was appointed as Procurator in the Finnish People's Delegation (the revolutionary government) on 28 January 1918. He was also appointed to the Supreme Leading Committee of the Red Guards (the army of the revolutionary government). One of his first tasks as procurator was to investigate the death of MP Antti Mikkola. Although several culprits were identified, the rapid progress of the Finnish Civil War meant that the revolutionary government didn't have time to punish the culprits.

In March/April 1918 revolutionary government chairman Kullervo Manner sent Turkia to Petrograd to seek assistance for the Red Guards. Following the Red defeat in May 1918 Turkia stayed in Soviet Russia where he was a member of the Finnish Labor Executive Committee. He was unwillingly embroiled in recurring conflicts between exiled Finnish revolutionaries. Unable to speak Russian, he was dependent on his compatriots.

In the summer of 1922, Turkia and his family were able to cross back into Finland on the fourth attempt. The family went from Viipuri to Tampere and on to Sweden where Turkia successfully applied for citizenship. The family soon returned to Finland but Turkia remained in Stockholm where he edited the Social-Demokraten from 1922 to 1927. He also wrote for Kansan Lehti, Raivaaja and Nykyaika using the pen name Emigrantti.

== Return to Finland, imprisonment and politics ==
Turkia returned to Finland on 16 August 1927 and reported to the police in Helsinki. He was sentenced to 8½ years in prison. He received a presidential pardon on 10 February 1928 and had his citizenship and civic rights restored despite the opposition of the Supreme Court. He was released from Tammisaari concentration camp on 13 February 1928.

Turkia was editor of Suomen Sosialidemokraatti from 1928 to 1932. He was re-elected to the Parliament of Finland at the 1930 parliamentary election. He was re-elected at the 1933, 1936 and 1939 parliamentary elections.

Turkia was a presidential elector at the 1931, 1937, 1940 and 1943 presidential elections. He was a member of the City Council of Helsinki. He was on the executive committee of the SDP and was president of the party's local branch in Uusimaa Province. He was on the board of left-wing publisher Kustannus Oy Kansanvalta.

Turkia died on 10 January 1946 in Helsinki.

== Works ==
- Kansa vaatimaan kunnallislakien uudistusta! : herrat vehkeilevät sitä vastaan!. Sosialidemokratinen eduskuntaryhmä. 1908.
- Kertoelmia kommunistivallan mailta (PDF). Tampere, Finland: Tampereen työväen sanomalehti o. y. 1924.
- Kommunismin kokeilukentiltä : elämyksiä ja näkemyksiä Neuvosto-Venäjältä (PDF). Tampere, Finland: Tampereen työväen sanomalehti o. y. 1924.
- Tiutisen työväenyhdistys 30-vuotias. Tiutisen työväenyhdistys. 1928.
- Kärsimysten teiltä (PDF). Hämeenlinna, Finland: Osakeyhtiö Hämeen kansa. 1928.

== See also ==
- List of Finnish MPs imprisoned for political reasons
