= Evert Eloranta =

Finnish politician (1879–1936)

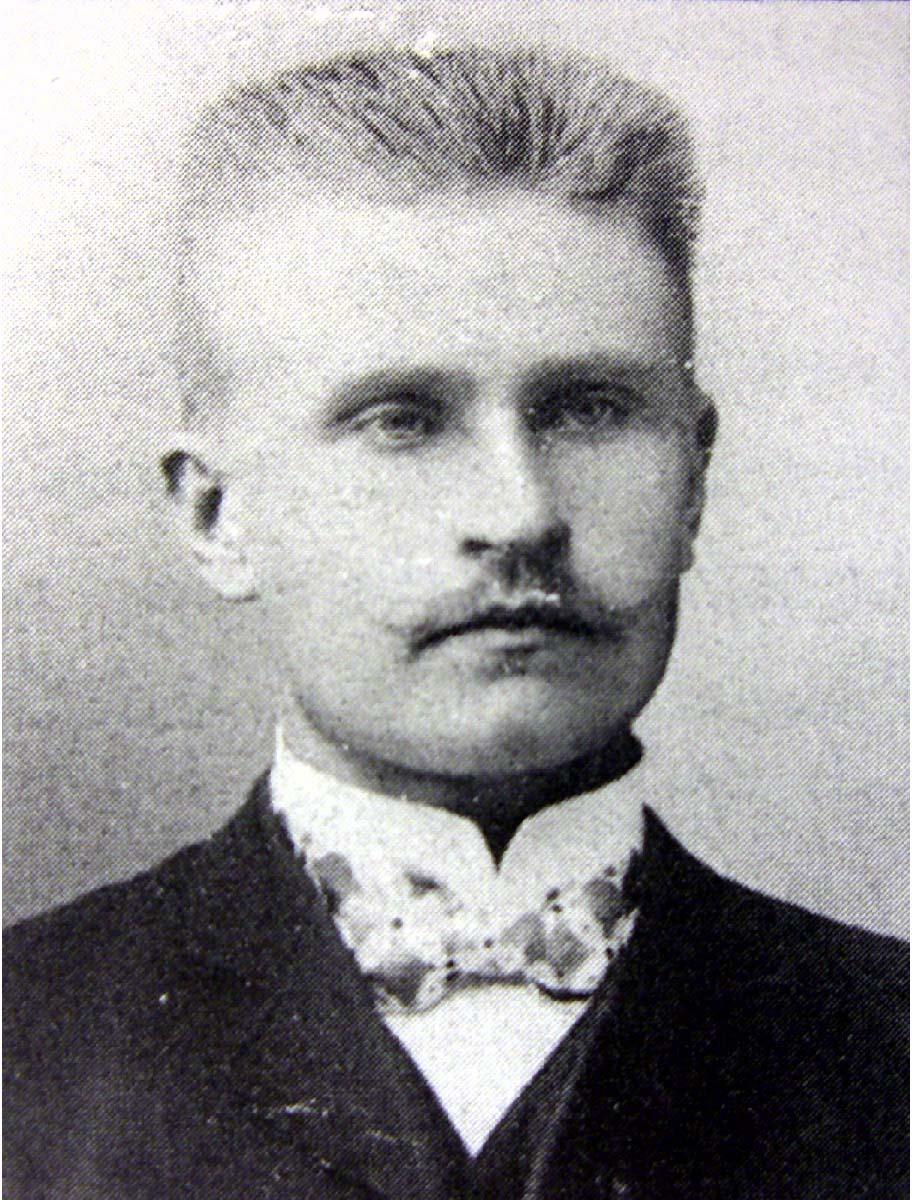
- Born: Frans Evert Tuominen; 10 October 1879; Harjavalta, Grand Duchy of Finland
- Died: 1936 (56–57 years); Soviet Union
- Occupation: Politician
- Known for: Member of the Parliament, Commander-in-chief of the Red Guards

Frans Evert Eloranta (10 October 1879 – 1936) was a Finnish politician and a member of the Parliament for the Social Democratic Party in 1908–1918. During the Finnish Civil War, Eloranta served as the minister of agriculture of the Finnish Socialist Workers' Republic. In March 1918, he was elected the commander-in-chief of the Red Guards as a member of the triumvirate with Eino Rahja and Adolf Taimi. After the war, Eloranta fled to the Soviet Russia, where he allegedly died in 1936.

== Life ==
=== Early years ===
Frans Evert Tuominen was born in Harjavalta, Satakunta province, as a son of a poor tenant farmer Johan Erland Erlandsson (b. 1852) and Eva Christina Fransdotter (b. 1854). The family lived in several places, finally settling in 1894 in Mynämäki, Finland Proper province. Eloranta worked from the early age and went to a school for only a year. He had jobs as a farm worker, construction worker, stonemason and a lumberjack. Eloranta also had a croft of his own in Karjala, where he joined the local worker's society and the Social Democratic Party.

Eloranta soon started working as a speaker and a party district secretary. In the 1908 general election he was elected to the Parliament of Finland from the electoral district of Finland Proper. During the era of the Russification of Finland, the parliament was often disbanded and Eloranta was elected six times between 1908 and 1917.

=== The Civil War ===
As the Finnish Civil War was launched in January 1918, Eloranta was a member of the Social Democratic party secretary. He was now elected to the Finnish People's Delegation, the governmental body of the Red Finland, and became the ″Delegate for Agriculture″. On 20 March, Eero Haapalainen was expelled from the post of the commander-of-chief of the Red Guards, and replaced by the triumvirate Eloranta, Adolf Taimi and Eino Rahja. They held the office for less than two weeks. After the defeat of the Battle of Tampere, the Red Government and the Red Guards staff fled from the capital Helsinki to the eastern Finnish town of Vyborg. The triumvirate was replaced by Kullervo Manner, who was given the dictatorial powers.

=== Life in the Soviet Union ===
During the Battle of Vyborg in the end of April, most of the leading Reds fled to the Soviet Russia, where Eloranta soon joined the exile Communist Party of Finland. Like many Finnish Reds, he entered the Petrograd Red Officer School and fought in the Russian Civil War. In 1921–1922 Eloranta worked as a librarian in Petrozavodsk. Later he travelled across the country as a speaker of the League of Militant Atheists and worked in the 1930s as a carpenter in Leningrad. Eloranta was granted the Soviet citizenship in 1929. His last years remain unknown, his last letter to his son was sent in 1938, but Eloranta allegedly died in the Soviet Union in 1936 according to official Soviet sources.

== Family ==
From 1912 to 1924 Evert Eloranta was married with Selma Alexandra Helkiö (1885–1985). He is the grandfather of the prominent Finnish psychiatrist Raisa Cacciatore and the great grandfather of the Social Democratic member of parliament Eeva-Johanna Eloranta.

Military offices
Preceded by Eero Haapalainen	Commander-in-chief of the Red Guards (with Eino Rahja and Adolf Taimi); 20 March 1918 – 10 April 1918	Succeeded by Kullervo Manner
