= Eero Haapalainen =

Finnish politician and trade unionist (1880–1937)

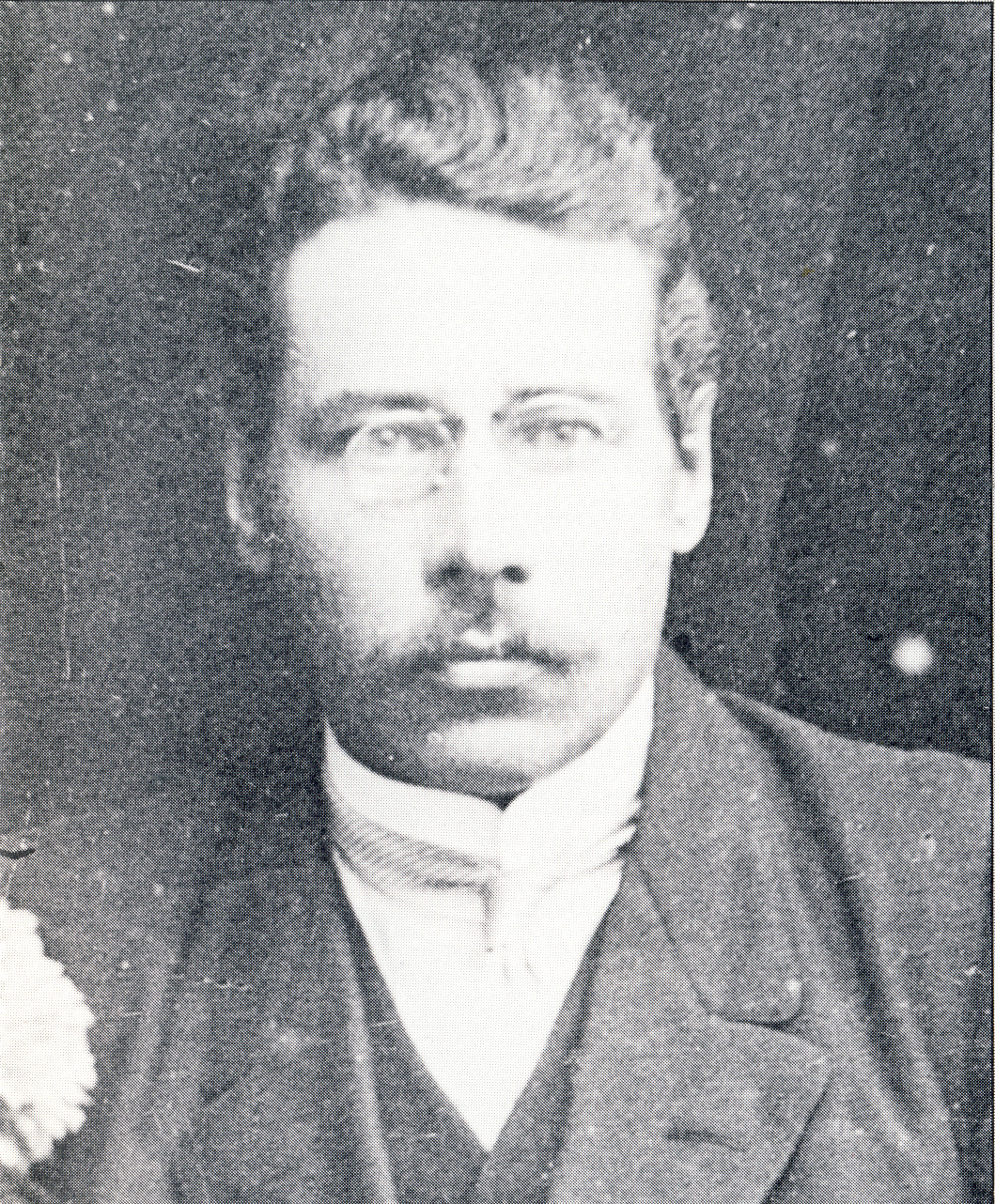
- Born: 27 October 1880; Kuopio, Grand Duchy of Finland, Russian Empire
- Died: 27 November 1937 (aged 57); Petrozavodsk, Russian SFSR, Soviet Union
- Occupations: Politician; trade unionist; journalist
- Organization(s): SDP, SAJ, SKP, CPSU

Eero Haapalainen (Russian: Эро Эрович Хаапалайнен, romanized: Ero Erovich Khaapalaynen; 27 October 1880 – 27 November 1937) was a Finnish politician, trade unionist and journalist, who served as the commander-in-chief of the Red Guards from January to March 1918 during the Finnish Civil War.

Haapalainen was one of the most prominent figures of the Finnish socialist movement in the early 1900s and the first chairman of the Finnish Trade Union Federation. Haapalainen was appointed commander of Red forces and elected to the Finnish People's Delegation of the Finnish Socialist Workers' Republic in January until he was removed from both posts by April. Haapalainen fled to Soviet Russia in May 1918 after the Reds' defeat where he joined the exile Communist Party of Finland and was active in Soviet Karelia. Haapalainen was arrested and executed during the Great Purge in 1937.

== Life ==
=== Early years ===
Eero Haapalainen was born on 27 October 1880 in the town of Kuopio in eastern Finland. His father Aaro was a carpenter and the mother, Wilhelmiina Kinnunen, a housewife who earned extra income as a seamstress for the shop of the author and social activist Minna Canth. Haapalainen's parents wanted him to become a priest, but after graduating from the Kuopio Lyceum, he studied for two years in a business college and entered the Helsinki University Faculty of Law in 1901. In Helsinki, he became involved with the labour movement and joined the Sawmill Workers' Union and the Social Democratic Party of Finland. In 1904, Haapalainen was not able to finish his studies due to lack of money and left the university. From 1903 to 1906, Haapalainen worked in the Social Democratic newspaper Työmies in Helsinki, and in 1907 he was the editor of Työ in Viipuri.

Haapalainen was one of the leading Red Guard organizers in Helsinki during the 1905 general strike. A year later, he was the delegate of the Finnish Social Democratic Party at the 4th Congress of the Russian Social Democratic Labour Party in Stockholm. In the summer of 1906, Haapalainen represented Finnish Social Democrats in the underground Bolshevik committee planning the Sveaborg rebellion. In April 1907, Haapalainen was elected as the first chairman of the Finnish Trade Union Federation (SAJ) which was founded in the Tampere Workers' Hall. Haapalainen was expelled from the office in 1911 due to his alcoholism. Haapalainen became a writer, publishing and translating several books and articles focusing in trade unionism and cooperatives. He also worked as an editor for the SAJ newsletter released monthly. In 1914, he served three months in prison for political agitation.

=== Finnish Civil War ===
After the 1917 February Revolution in Russia, the social situation in Finland became restless due to the food shortage and deep unemployment. Haapalainen was one of the most radical persons in the labour movement, openly calling for armed revolution, and organized Red Guards in southern Finland. In October, he became the commander of the Kymi Paper Mill Red Guard in Kuusankoski. A month later, Haapalainen was elected to the five-men committee which was in charge of all Finnish Red Guards. As the Finnish Civil War broke out in late January 1918, Haapalainen replaced Ali Aaltonen as the Red Guards' commander-in-chief, even though he did not have any military training. He was also elected to the Finnish People's Delegation (the Red government) as the delegate for "internal affairs," effectively making him the interior minister for the Red movement in Finland. As a Red Guard commander, he issued a manifesto proclaiming the Finnish Socialist Workers' Republic, a socialist state which openly challenged the established Government of Finland. In February, he guaranteed the safe removal for the composer Jean Sibelius from his home Ainola to the capital Helsinki.

On 20 March, Haapalainen was removed as commander-in-chief of the Red Guards after a series of defeats. He was replaced by a troika composed of Eino Rahja, Adolf Taimi and Evert Eloranta. Haapalainen remained a member of the Finnish People's Delegation, but was dismissed in late April when the government had fled to Viipuri. Haapalainen was charged of drunkenness, inappropriate behavior and careless use of firearm. The Viipuri court martial ordered him to the front, but the decision was not implemented as the Red government and most of the Red Guard staff fled to the Soviet Russia in 25 April. Haapalainen and Edvard Gylling were one of the few leading Reds who stayed in Viipuri and organized the city's defense, but the Reds finally surrendered on 29 April. Haapalainen and Gylling avoided being caught and, in May, fled to Petrograd on a motor boat.

=== Life in the Soviet Union ===
Haapalainen became one of many prominent communists who fled to Russia after the failed revolutions in Europe. Haapalainen became a member of the Russian Communist Party (Bolsheviks) and was also one of the founders of the exile Communist Party of Finland in August 1918. Later in the autumn, he fought in the Russian Civil War in a unit organized by the Finnish Red Felix Ravelin in Perm. In the summer of 1919, Haapalainen was establishing a nursing home for disabled Finnish Red Guard veterans near Kiev, but the idea never realized. Haapalainen moved to Petrograd, where he worked as a lecturer in the Red Officer School and served as a political officer in the 6th Finnish Regiment of the Red Army. From March to April 1920, Haapalainen fought against the Finnish White Guards in the Russian Civil War.

In the summer of 1920, Haapalainen was moved to Petrozavodsk in the Karelia region. He held several posts in the Karelian Workers' Commune but was dismissed in 1923 due to his drinking problem. He was transferred to the town of Kalevala where he worked as an interpreter. In the beginning of 1925, Haapalainen was a member of the Finnish Comintern delegation in Germany. He started drinking again and was sent back to Russia in March. As a result, Haapalainen was now expelled from the Communist Party. He moved back to Kalevala, where he worked as a teacher and a newspaperman. From May 1931, his last assignment was the head of the revolution research department in the Karelian Research Institute in Petrozavodsk. In October 1935, he was expelled as a "nationalist" in October 1935 and lived as a pensioner.

== Death ==
On 27 October 1937, Haapalainen was arrested by the NKVD during the Great Purge on charges of being a Trotskyist and a nationalist counterrevolutionary. He was one of many foreign communists in the Soviet Union arrested on false charges due to Joseph Stalin's personal suspicion of them. Reportedly, he was interrogated and tortured by the NKVD but refused to confess to his alleged crimes. On 20 November, Haapalainen was sentenced for 10 years, but a tribunal of Karelian ASSR section of the NKVD sentenced him to death. On 27 November 1937, Haapalainen was shot in Petrozavodsk.

Haapalainen was rehabilitated in the Soviet Union during the de-Stalinization process in May 1957, four years after the death of Stalin.

In the early 1990s, Haapalainen's remains were discovered in a mass grave at a gravel pit in Petrozavodsk that was used as an execution site by the NKVD. On 30 October 1994, Haapalainen was one of 38 victims of the Great Purge who were reburied at a cemetery in the Zareka district of Petrozavodsk.

== See also ==
- Kullervo Manner

Military offices
Preceded by Ali Aaltonen	Commander-in-chief of the Red Guards; 26 January 1918–20 March 1918	Succeeded by Evert Eloranta; Eino Rahja; Adolf Taimi
