= Finnish People's Delegation =

Socialist revolutionary government during the civil war era

- Seal of the Finnish People’s Delegation, 1918

History
- Established: 29 January 1918
- Disbanded: 5 May 1918
- Preceded by: Senate of Finland
- Succeeded by: Senate of Finland

Leadership
- Chairman: Kullervo Manner; 29 January – 25 April 1918
- Office Vacant; 25 April - 5 May 1918

The Finnish People's Delegation (Finnish: Suomen kansanvaltuuskunta, Swedish: Finska folkdelegationen) was the government of the Finnish Socialist Workers' Republic (Red Finland) created by a group of members in the Social Democratic Party of Finland during the Finnish Civil War from January to May 1918.

The Delegation was established as a rival to the Government of Finland and seized power in Helsinki at the start of the Civil War by supplanting Pehr Evind Svinhufvud's first senate and Parliament. It passed laws and enactments aspiring to a socialist reform of Finland as per the policy of the labor movement with support from the armed Red Guards. The Chair of the Delegation was the former Speaker of the Parliament Kullervo Manner. The Central Workers' Council operated alongside the Delegation but its role in the Reds' administration was minor. Soviet Russia was the only nation to recognize the Delegation as the government of Finland and its main supporter in the Civil War. The Delegation moved from Helsinki to Viipuri in April, from where its members fled to Petrograd after the defeat of the Red Guards.

== Formation and immediate actions ==
The decision to start an armed revolution in Finland was initially made by Red Guards' leadership and by a branch split from Social Democratic Party of Finland (SDP) party committee on 23 January 1918, called "Finland's workers' executive committee", whose members represented the most radical wing of the labor movement. On the night of 27 January, the executive committee ordered the Red Guards to arrest members of the Senate led by Pehr Evind Svinhufvud, and a host of other leading bourgeois politicians, including 33 members of Parliament. However, this failed completely, and the Red Guards' Supreme military staff postponed the coup by a day because of unfinished preparations, so the senators were informed of the arrest warrant through a prematurely issued public handout, and had time to hide. The assembling of Parliament on 28 January was blocked and a few members that turned up were arrested.

The Finnish People's Delegation was established on 28 January 1918 and it set to lead the revolt started on the same morning. The founding of the Delegation was announced on 29 January in the newspaper Työmies in a declaration that also named the delegates, and in which the fundamental objectives of the Red government were briefly explained. The Delegation already on its first day occupied the Senate House in Helsinki and established itself as the government of the Finnish Socialist Workers' Republic (Red Finland), an alternative socialist state to the pre-existing Finnish state.

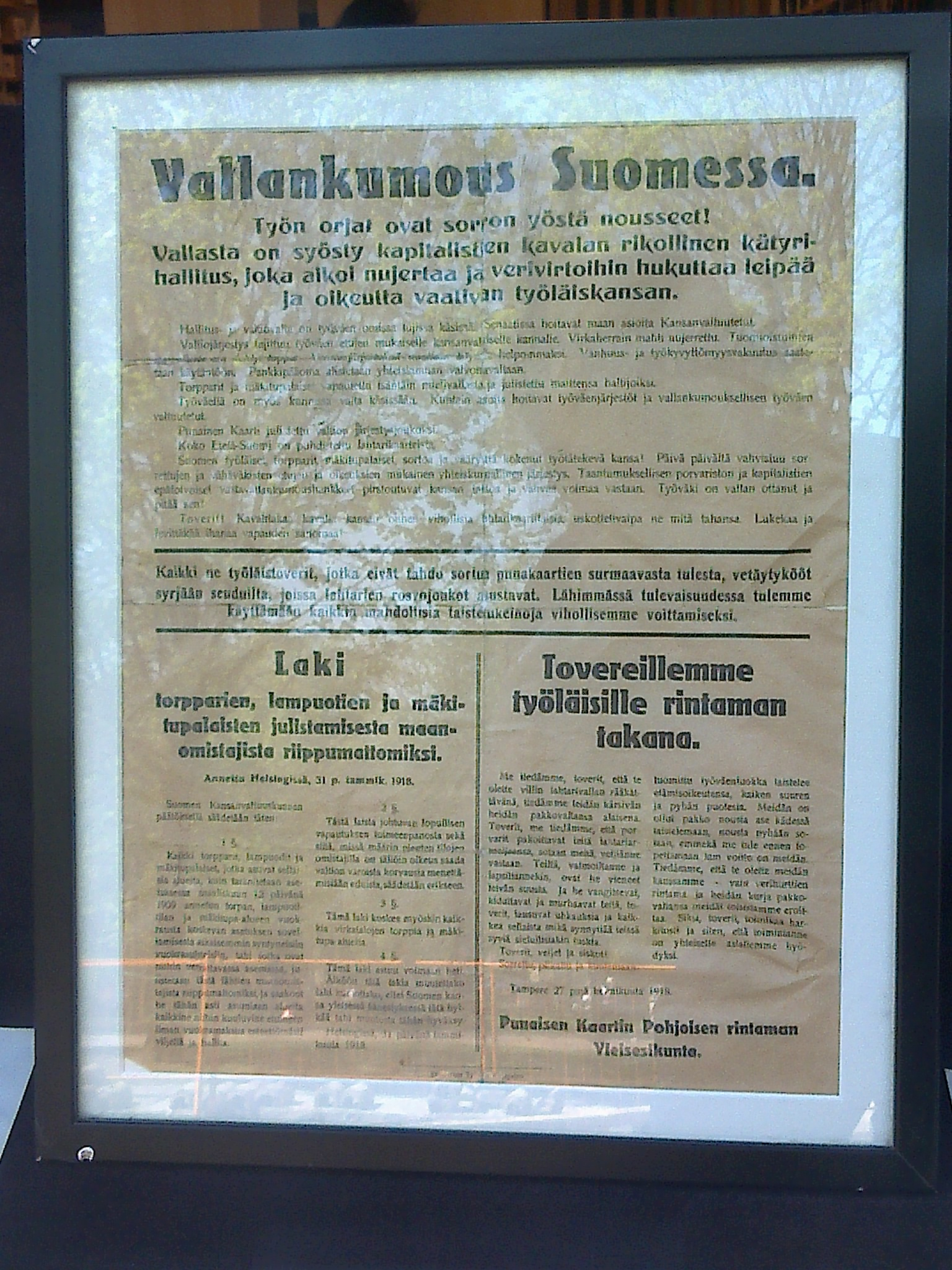
A 1918 poster announcing the revolution in Finland, part of the Finnish Civil War. The lower-right section contains a law adopted by the People’s Delegation.

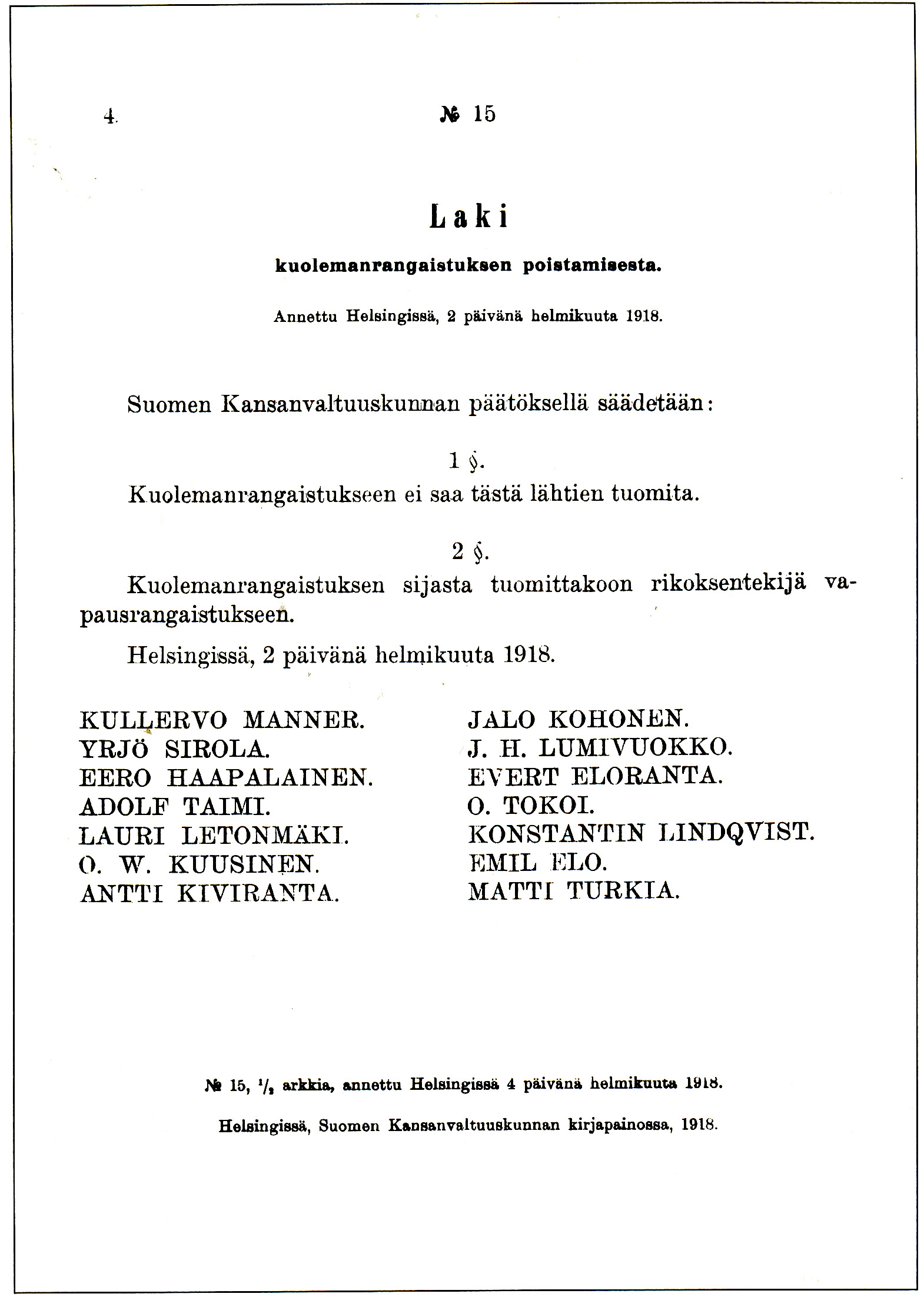
The law of February 2, 1918 on the abolition of the death penalty issued by the People's Delegation. The laws and regulations of the People's Delegation were often short and entered into force immediately.

The Red administration's first action was to discontinue all capitalist newspapers, already on 28 January in the capital, and over the next few days in other cities in Finland. On 2 February, the Delegation confirmed the "counterrevolutionary" press to be suspended "indefinitely". The suspension even applied to the right wing social democratic Työn Valta and Itä-Suomen Työmies newspapers. After this the only papers allowed to be published were the papers of the Social Democratic Party and the Christian labor movement. The Whites' Senate discontinued all social democratic papers correspondingly. In March, the Delegation's Postal and Announcement Department placed preventive censorship on the remaining papers' reporting on the military and foreign affairs.

On 2 February, the Delegation ordered the Red Guards to be maintained by the government, essentially placing them under its authority. In practice, the Delegation was later forced to confess that it could barely control the actions of the Red Guards, and reduced the number of military affairs cases it handled. The relationship between the Red Guards and the Delegation remained problematic throughout the war, as the Delegation regarded the Red Guards' actions to be arbitrary, and many guardsmen in turn saw the delegates as "parasites" who were estranged from the realities of the battlefront.

In its set of decrees, it published 45 statutes in all, and favoured concised and scant language. Most of the Delegation's time went into producing new legislation. It has been estimated that about two thirds of its written laws were reactions to acute administerial issues, and the rest aimed at ideological goals or increasing support. Particularly the laws passed on ideological grounds were modeled after the legislation produced by the Paris Commune of 1871 and also the October Revolution in neighboring Soviet Russia, but mostly after Finland's labor movement's previous programmes. The laws passed by the Delegation were announced in the newspaper Suomen Kansanvaltuuskunnan Tiedonantoja.

== Finnish People's Delegation members ==
The delegation members were elected and given similar roles as ministers in a government:

- chairman ("prime minister") Kullervo Manner
- delegate for foreign affairs ("foreign minister") Yrjö Sirola
- delegate for internal affairs ("internal minister") Eero Haapalainen, from March Adolf Taimi, Matti Airola and Hanna Karhinen
- delegate for justice ("minister of justice") Lauri Letonmäki and Antti Kiviranta
- delegate for education ("minister of education") Otto Wille Kuusinen
- delegate for monetary affairs ("minister of finance") Jalo Kohonen, later Edvard Gylling
- delegate for labour ("minister of labour") Johan Erik Lumivuokko
- delegate for agriculture ("ministry of agriculture and forestry") Evert Eloranta
- delegate for provisions ("minister of supply") Oskari Tokoi
- delegate for transport ("minister of transport") Konstantin Lindqvist
- delegate for posts and information ("minister of communications") Emil Elo
- Procurator ("chancellor of justice") Matti Turkia.

Seats on the Supreme Workers' Council were allocated by the People's Delegation as follows:

- Finnish Trade Union Federation, 10
- Social Democratic Party of Finland, 10
- Red Guard, 10
- Helsinki Labour Unions, 5

== Constitutional proposal ==
The People's Delegation drew up a new Constitution, taking influences from the American and Swiss Constitution and ideas from the French Revolution. A referendum on the proposal was planned.

== Leadership ==
The People’s Delegation of Finland served as the government of the Finnish Socialist Workers’ Republic during the 1918 Civil War. Its leadership was headed by Kullervo Manner, who acted as chairman and the highest political authority of Red Finland. Under him, a group of commissioners (functioning like ministers) managed key areas of administration—finance (Edvard Gylling), education (Otto Wille Kuusinen), internal affairs (Yrjö Mäkelin), war (Eero Haapalainen), justice (Johan Helo), agriculture, labor, transport, and supply. Together, this leadership attempted to carry out socialist reforms and run the state while directing the Red Guards’ war effort. However, their authority was strained by wartime shortages, weak central control, and advancing White forces. The Delegation collapsed in April–May 1918 after the military defeat of the Reds.

=== Chairman of the People's Delegation ===
Chairman of the People's Delegation
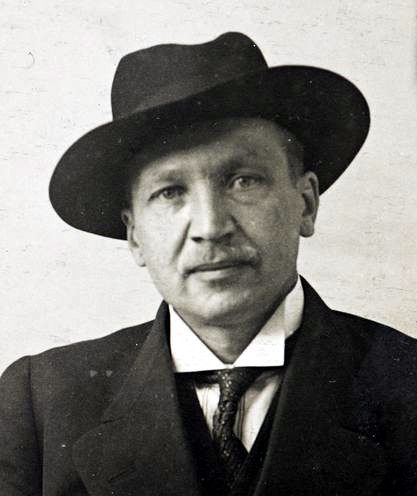
- Kullervo Manner; 29 January – 25 April 1918
- Formation: 29 January
- Final holder: Kullervo Manner
- Abolished: 25 April 1918

Kullervo Manner was the Chairman of the People’s Delegation, the revolutionary socialist government that ruled Red-controlled areas of Finland during the Finnish Civil War in 1918. The People’s Delegation was established in January 1918 after tensions between socialist workers’ groups and conservative political forces escalated into open conflict shortly after Finland gained independence from Russia in 1917. Manner, a prominent socialist politician and former Speaker of the Finnish Parliament, became the chief political leader of the Red government. The delegation operated from Helsinki and attempted to create a socialist republic based on workers’ power, inspired partly by the Russian Revolution and supported to some extent by Bolshevik Russia.

As chairman, Manner directed political administration, military organization, and propaganda efforts for the Red side. The People’s Delegation controlled much of southern Finland, including several major industrial cities, while the anti-socialist White government controlled the north. The Red administration introduced emergency laws, attempted land and labor reforms, and sought to reorganize Finnish society along socialist lines. However, the government struggled with military coordination, economic disruption, internal divisions, and the pressures of civil war. White forces led by Carl Gustaf Emil Mannerheim gradually gained the advantage with support from Germany.

By May 1918, the Red forces were defeated, and the People’s Delegation collapsed. Manner and other Red leaders fled to Soviet Russia to avoid capture and execution. In exile, he remained active in communist politics and later became involved with the Communist Party of Finland and international communist organizations. His role as chairman made him one of the most important political figures on the Red side during the Finnish Civil War and a central figure in Finland’s revolutionary socialist movement.

Seal of the Finnish People’s Delegation, 1918

== Dissolution ==
From March, a string of defeats had caused the Red Guards (and by extension the Delegation and Red Finland) to be increasingly pushed southeast into the Karelian Isthmus. In April, the Delegation fled from Helsinki to Viipuri, the fourth-largest city in Finland which was located close to the border with Russia. However, the Whites were descending on Viipuri and an attack on the city was imminent. On 23 April, the Delegation was effectively dissolved when almost all of its members fled to Russia. Oskari Tokoi fled to the United Kingdom and from there to United States. The Red Guards that stayed to defend Viipuri, now without political leadership, branded them as traitors. The Delegation assembled for a session in Helsinki 89 times in all, and in Viipuri less than ten times.

Members of the Delegation were not included in the amnesty of Red Guards issued by the Finnish government in late 1918. They could face treason charges if they returned to Finland and, as a result, lived in exile for the remainder of their lives. Delegation members in Russia were soon repurposed by the Bolsheviks for activities related to Finland and other Finnic peoples, particularly in Soviet Karelia. They were involved in the establishment of the Communist Party of Finland (SKP), which was banned in Finland and operated underground. Delegation members served as the leadership of the SKP and controlled its activities in Finland from their exile in Russia. In the late 1930s, many surviving members were condemned and executed by the Soviets in the Great Purge.

== See also ==
- Red Finland
