= Karelian Research Centre of RAS =

State public institute of the Russian Academy of Sciences

- Карельский научный центр РАН
- Logo of the Karelian Research Centre of Russian Academy of Sciences
- Abbreviation: KarRC RAS
- Formation: January 31, 1946 (80 years ago)
- Purpose: Science and research
- Members: 7 research institutes
- Official language: Russian
- Leader: Olga Bakhmet
- Parent organization: Russian Academy of Sciences, Ministry of Science and Higher Education
- Website: www.krc.karelia.ru

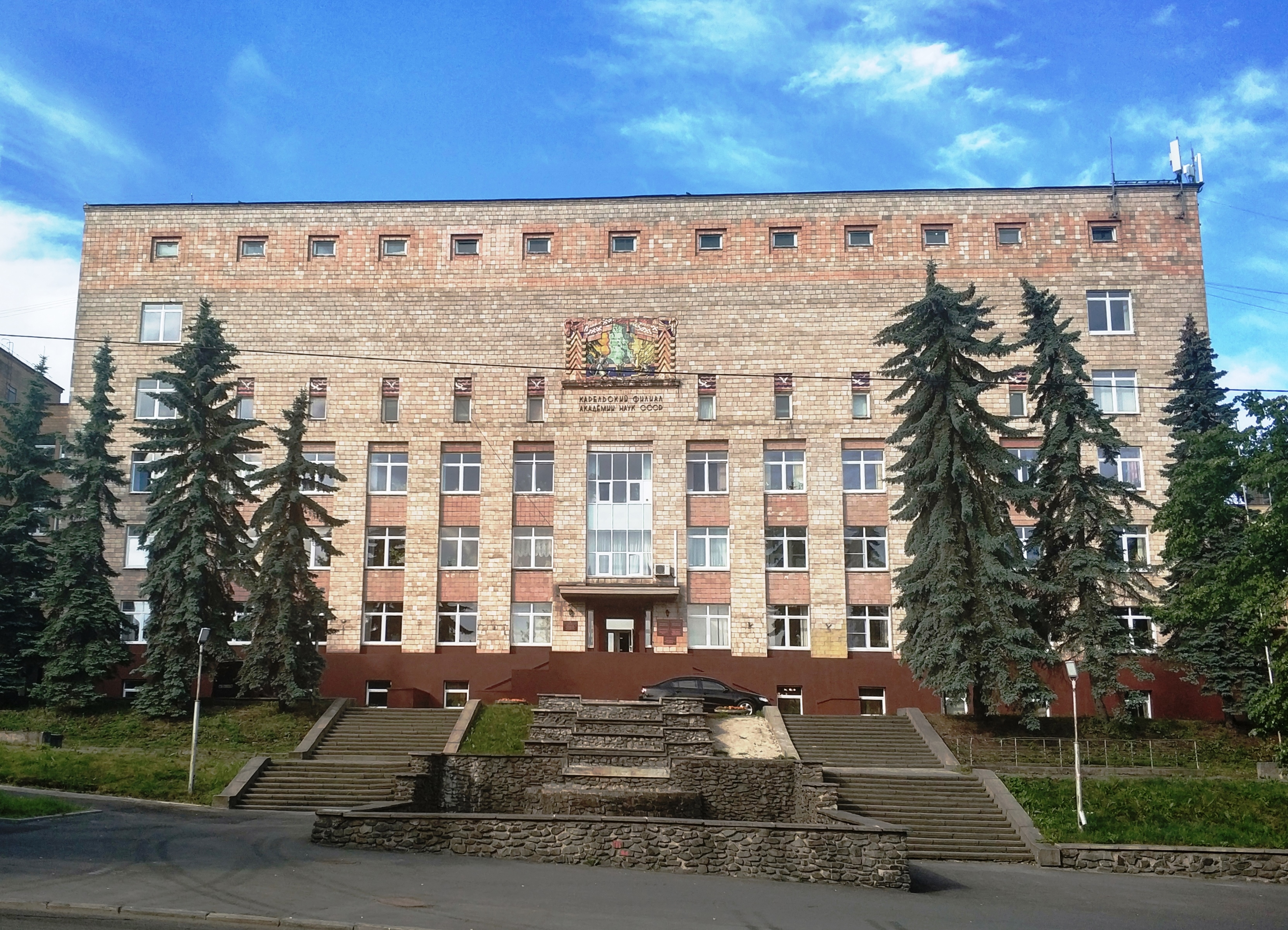
The main building Karelian Research Centre of RAS in 2020

The Karelian Research Centre of RAS (KarRC RAS) is a state public institute of the Russian Academy of Sciences based in Petrozavodsk. It was founded on January 31, 1946. At the beginning of 2010, the centre employed 751 personnel, including 3 Corresponding Academicians, 70 Doctors of Science (DSc) and 214 Candidates of Science (PhD).

According to a 2006 book, KarRC RAS mission was stated as:

- organization and implementation of basic and applied research under governmental, academy and regional programmes, as well as under assignments from RAS divisions and exploration projects;
- the coordination of research activities carried out by KarRC RAS units, universities and other scientific organizations, organizations and institutions under ministries and departments, which work in the region;
- the organization of international scientific cooperation;
- the training of highly qualified scientific staff;
- the publication of its own editions (monographic books, volumes of collected papers, express editions, popular science books, brochures, etc.).

== History ==
The KarRC RAS timeline of major events includes:

- 1930 — Complex Karelian Research Institute was founded
- 1937 — it was reorganized into the Karelian Research Institute of Culture
- 1946 — Karelian-Finnish Research Facility of the Academy of Sciences of the USSR with its scientific and general subdivisions was established
- 1949 — the Facility was renamed as the Karelian-Finnish Branch of the Academy of Sciences of the USSR
- 1956 — the Branch was renamed as the Karelian Branch of the Academy of Sciences of the USSR
- 1963 — the Karelian Branch was closed, the divisions became part of ministries and departments
- 1967 — the Karelian Branch of the Academy of Sciences of the USSR was reopened as a unity of 6 research institutions
- 1990 — the Karelian Branch was transformed into Karelian Research Centre of the Academy of Sciences of the USSR
- 1991 — became the Karelian Research Centre of the Russian Academy of Sciences
- 2007 — renamed to the Russian Academy Institution Karelian Research Centre of the Russian Academy of Sciences
- 2011 — renamed to Federal Public Budgetary Institution of Science Karelian Research Centre of the Russian Academy of Sciences
- 2014 — renamed to Federal Public Budgetary Institution Karelian Research Centre of the Russian Academy of Sciences

=== Karelian Research Institute (KRI) ===
On the 24th of September, 1930, the Council of People's Commissars of the Autonomous Karelian SSR passed the resolution "On foundation of the Karelian Research (Complex) Institute – KRI". KRI began operating in 1931, and E. Gylling was appointed the director (Vice Director — S. A. Makaryev). KRI was set up to comprise 6 structural units for:

1. forestry and forest industry
2. natural productive forces
3. agriculture
4. socio-economic
5. history and revolution
6. ethnography and linguistics

The units were later on reinforced and enlarged.

In the very first year of KRI operation, 19 expeditions and field trips were organized. Owing to the systematic sampling and collecting work, highly valuable field materials were detected and preserved, and the baseline for scientific research was enriched.

One of the biggest problems for the Institute was the shortage of human resources with relevant qualifications and experience. A wide practice was to invite scholars from Leningrad and Moscow.

=== Karelian Research Institute of Culture (KRIC) ===
On the 11th of January 1937, the resolution was adopted transforming KRI into the Karelian Research Institute of Culture (KRIC), where only the humanities were retained. Further redundancies and closing of structural units followed. Units of the natural sciences, technical and economic profiles were transferred to corresponding governmental authorities, and the rest were either partially or totally disposed of.

In this period the institute studied the history of Karelia, its culture, languages and folk poetry (Russian and Karelian folklore).

In 1937—1938, political repressions affected the institute's staff even more, and dismissals continued. The institute's vice director S. A. Makaryev, leading specialists E. A. Haapalainen, N. V. Khrisanfov, N. N. Vinogradov, director of the library E. P. Oshevenskaya were arrested and executed on false accusations of setting up an espionage and rebel nationalist organization at the institute.

When the Karelian-Finnish Republic was founded in 1940 it was announced that KRIC needs to be transformed into the regional branch of the USSR Academy of Sciences (AS), but World War II impeded the realization of this intention. During the war, the institute's archives were moved deeper into the country, and KRIC itself was evacuated to Syktyvkar (Komi ASSR), where the institute's activities were temporarily halted in 1942 and resumed in 1943. In the summer of 1944, after the liberation of Petrozavodsk, KRIC was moved back. In 1945 the idea of reform re-surfaced, and the first step was the transformation of KRIC into the Institute of History, Linguistics and Literature (HLL Institute) made up of three sections (departments): of history, linguistics, literature & folk art. HLL Institute was comprised in the Karelian-Finnish Research Facility of the Academy of Sciences of the USSR.

=== Karelian-Finnish Research Facility of the Academy of Sciences of the USSR ===
On 31.01.1946 the resolution was adopted on the establishment of the Karelian-Finnish Research Facility of the Academy of Sciences of the USSR. It was made up of the following units (sections): Geology, Hydrology and Water Economy, Soil Science and Botany, Zoology, Industry & Economics, Laboratory of Forest Chemistry, HLL Institute; Kivach Strict Nature Reserve; scientific library and photo laboratory. A. A. Polkanov (1946—1947) was appointed the director, but had to resign in 1947 because of poor health, ceding the position to I. I. Gorsky (1947—1952). In 1948 the Industry and Economics Section was split into Economics Section and Laboratory of Non-metalliferous Minerals, and the Forest Laboratory was organized to be transformed into the Forest Section in the following year. Later on, the laboratories of parasitology and animal farming, and the White Sea Biological Research Station were set up.

=== Karelian-Finnish (Karelian) Branch of the Academy of Sciences of the USSR ===
On the 6th of October 1949, the Karelian-Finnish Research Facility of the Academy of Sciences of the USSR was reorganized into the Karelian-Finnish Branch of the Academy of Sciences of the USSR. In 1952 I. I. Sykiäinen (1952—1957) became its president. The organization carried out research on useful minerals, water and energy resources, economic issues, forestry and forest industry; developed methods for wise use of logging wastes, fish resources of inland waters and the White Sea; continued studies of the history, literature and folk art of Karelia. In 1949—1951 most of the activities within the Integrated Expedition for the Study of the Productive Forces and Development Potential of Western Karelian Districts were implemented. In 1951 two new departments appeared: for economics and for mire science (including experimental facilities). In 1953 the Institute of Biology, and Departments of Hydrology and Energy were established. As of 1953, the structure of the Karelian-Finnish Branch of the Academy of Sciences of the USSR was the following: Geology Section; Hydrology and Water Economy Section; Forest Section; Economics Section; Kivach Strict Nature Reserve; Publishing Section; Scientific Library; Archives; Cartography Office; Photo Laboratory, HLL Institute and the Institute of Biology .

=== Karelian Branch of the Academy of Sciences of the USSR ===
In 1956, as the republic changed status from union to autonomous the Karelian-Finnish Branch of the Academy of Sciences of the USSR was renamed as the Karelian Branch of the Academy of Sciences of the USSR. The next president after I. I. Sykiäinen was V. S. Slodkevich (1957—1960), then the position was shortly held by V. P. Dadykin (1960—1962), who was succeeded by V. I. Yermakov (1962—1964, 1967).

Museum of Precambrian Geology in the Institute of Geology, 2018.

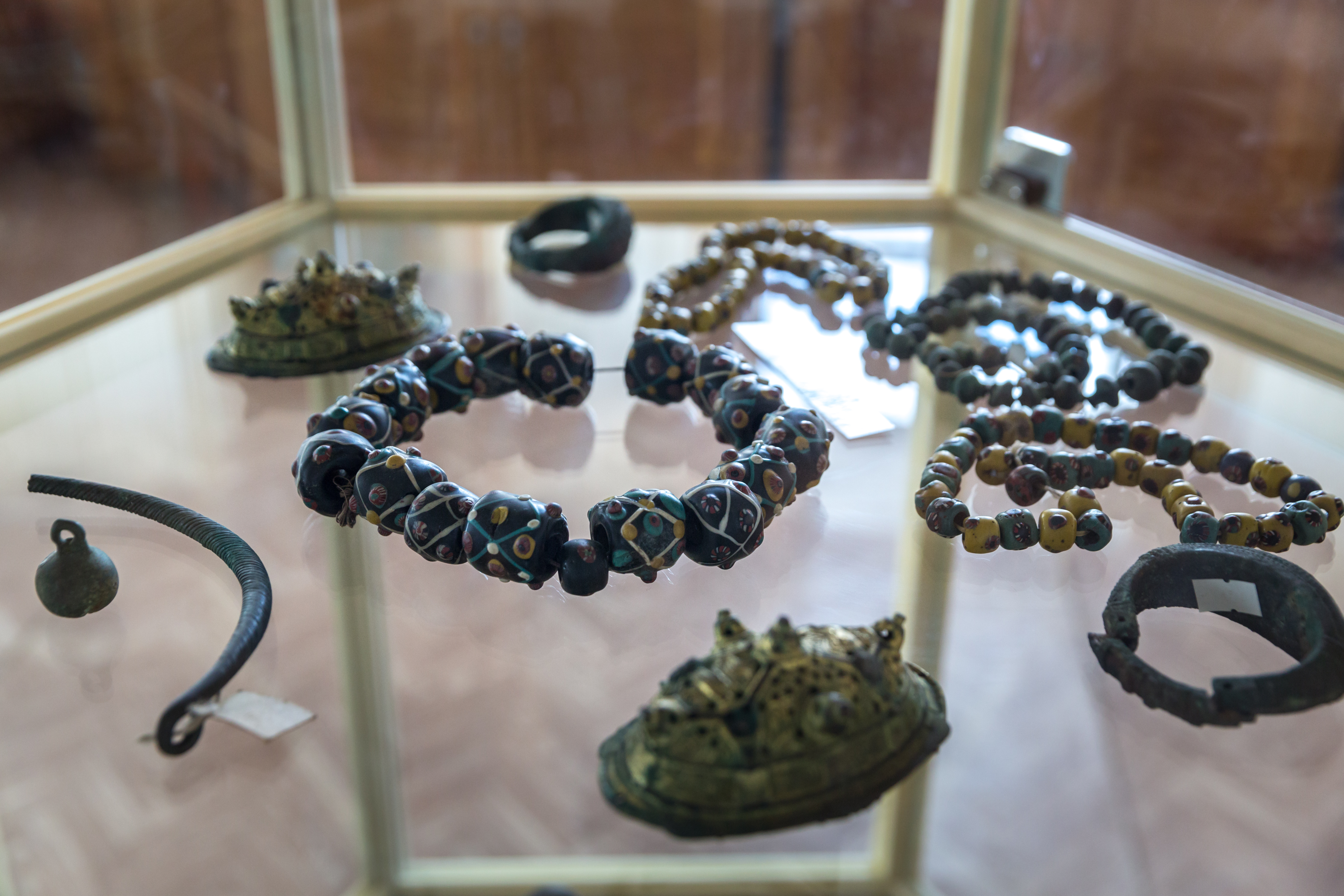
Archaeological finds from the mounds of the Oyat River. Museum of Precambrian Geology, 2015.

In 1957 there appeared the Forest Research Institute and the White Sea Biological Research Station under the Institute of Biology, and in 1961 the Institute of Geology with Museum of Precambrian Geology.

On the 21st of November 1963, the Presidium of the Academy of Sciences of the USSR passed the ordinance "On the actions in connection with the termination of the operation of the Bashkir, Karelian and Kazan branches of the Academy of Sciences of the USSR". Pursuant to this ordinance the Karelian Branch of the Academy of Sciences of the USSR stopped operating on 01.01.1964. The only unit retained with the Academy of Sciences was the HLL Institute with the scientific library, archives and cartography office now subordinated to it. The Institute of Biology became an entity with own budget directly subordinated to the Petrozavodsk State University. The Forest Research Institute is renamed as the Karelian Forest Institute and transferred to the authority of the State Committee on Forest, Pulp-and-paper, Woodworking Industry and Forestry subordinated to the USSR Gosplan, and the Institute of Geology becomes subordinated to the USSR Ministry of Geology. On 18.02.1967 the USSR Council of Ministers adopted the Resolution "On reinstitution of the Karelian Branch of the Academy of Sciences of the USSR". The Karelian Branch of the Academy of Sciences of the USSR was reassembled to comprise the Institutes of Geology, Forest Research, Biology, HLL, Departments of Hydrology and Water Economy, Economics. Having resumed its activities the Karelian Branch of the Academy of Sciences of the USSR was developing successfully relying on previous experience. The first president after the reinstitution was N. I. Pjavchenko (1968—1976). Leadership after N. I. Pjavchenko was ceded to scientists working at the Karelian Branch: first V. A. Sokolov (1976—1986) and then I. M. Nesterenko (1987—1991).

=== Karelian Research Centre RAS ===
In 1990 the Karelian Branch of the Academy of Sciences of the USSR was transformed into the Karelian Research Centre of the Academy of Sciences of the USSR, and in 1991 it was renamed as the Karelian Research Centre RAS. A. F. Titov became the new president (1991 onwards). In 1991 the Northern Water Problems Institute was established through transformation from the Water Problems Department. The institutes began transition to legal and financial independence. Institutes of Geology, Northern Water Problems, Forest Research, Department of Mathematics and Data Analysis became legal entities in 1993, Institute of Biology in 1997, and Institutes of HLL and Economics in 1998. New departments were established: Editing and Publishing, Financial and Economic, Maintenance and Procurements, Repair and Construction, Programming Group. In 1996 the Department of Economics was transformed into the Institute of Economics. In 1999 the Department of Mathematics and Data Analysis was reorganized into the Institute of Applied Mathematical Research. The process of transforming KarRC RAS departments into institutes and legal entities was thus completed. Staff reduction and aging, social insecurity of scientists were progressing, the prestige of science in Russia was declining. Russian science was underfinanced. Fund-raising had to be activated to win grants, contracts, etc. KarRC RAS enlarged the number of its interdisciplinary programmes and projects, widened partnerships with various organizations and institutions in Karelia, Russia and other countries. It managed to improve the working environment for some auxiliary units and services. The main outcome of the last decade of the 20th century is probably the fact that despite all the hardships academic science had gone through KarRC RAS has managed to preserve the bulk of its human and scientific resources, gradually adapted to the new circumstances without compromising much of the amount and quality of its scientific products, and generated a solid background for future development. Funding still remained the main challenge, being mostly received from the federal budget but in amounts clearly insufficient for normal operation. Search for additional sources has become constant.

== KarRC RAS governance ==
=== General Assembly ===
The supreme governing body of KarRC RAS is the General Assembly, chaired by KarRC RAS President. The main functions and tasks of the General Assembly are to:

- consider and adopt KarRC RAS Charter, additions and amendments to the Charter
- plan for the KarRC RAS development concept
- hear and endorse the annual report on KarRC RAS activities
- elect KarRC RAS President, Vice-Presidents, Chief Secretary for Science, members of KarRC RAS Presidium, and submit the nominations to RAS Presidium to be endorsed.

=== Presidium ===
KarRC RAS Presidium is in charge of the current activities; its members are: the President, Vice-Presidents, Chief Secretary for Science, and KarRC RAS leading scientists (elected by the KarRC RAS General Assembly). Members of KarRC RAS Presidium are endorsed by RAS Presidium for a five-year term. Some of the KarRC RAS Presidium's functions are to:

- coordinate scientific and research activities within KarRC RAS and cooperation with other scientific organizations and producers, as well as with higher educational institutions; arrange for their interactions;
- facilitate efficient operation of all structural units that share a common scientific and supporting infrastructure;
- compile integrated regional research programmes and projects, endorse their leaders and coordinators, control the spending of the allocated funds, and evaluate the results and outputs of the activities;
- consider the key lines for basic research to be conducted by KarRC RAS scientific organizations (institutes);
- promote practical utilization of KarRC RAS developments, inventions and research results;
- carry out expert assessments and provide expertise in line with the profile of the respective institutes;
- supervise scientific staff training within post-doctoral and doctoral schools, external doctoral studies and scientific study and exchange trips;
- contribute to the strengthening and development of international scientific contacts;
- organize publishing activities, as well as construction, repair and renovation of corporate buildings.

=== President ===
Acts as the principal organizer of the work of the Presidium and KarRC RAS in general. Some of the President's functions are to: control the distribution of budgetary allocations and credit funds; bear personal responsibility for the state of affairs, report to RAS Presidium and KarRC RAS General Assembly; represent the institution at RAS, governmental authorities and public institutions, NGOs and international organizations; endorse (upon negotiation with RAS divisions) the research action plans of KarRC RAS institutes and cost estimates for their implementation; manage the activities of the Presidium apparatus; chair the meetings of the KarRC RAS General Assembly.

=== Board of directors ===
KarRC RAS Board of Directors is the advisory body with the task to consider and work out recommendations on current issues of research organization, administration and maintenance. KarRC RAS Board of Directors was established in the 1990s. Its members are: Vice-President for General Affairs and directors of each of KarRC RAS institutes. The Board of Directors offers the leaders of KarRC RAS institutes the possibility to directly participate in discussions of important corporate matters and deal with them concertedly. Recommendations issued by the Board of Directors are usually taken into account in managerial decision-making.

== Auxiliary units ==
Personnel training and fire training alarm in KarRC RAS, 2018.

In addition to research institutes, KarRC RAS comprises supporting units meant to capacitate normal operation of the former. The list of these units and their size are subject to endorsement by RAS Presidium. The list and structure of production units within KarRC RAS are subject to endorsement by KarRC RAS Presidium.

=== Scientific Library ===
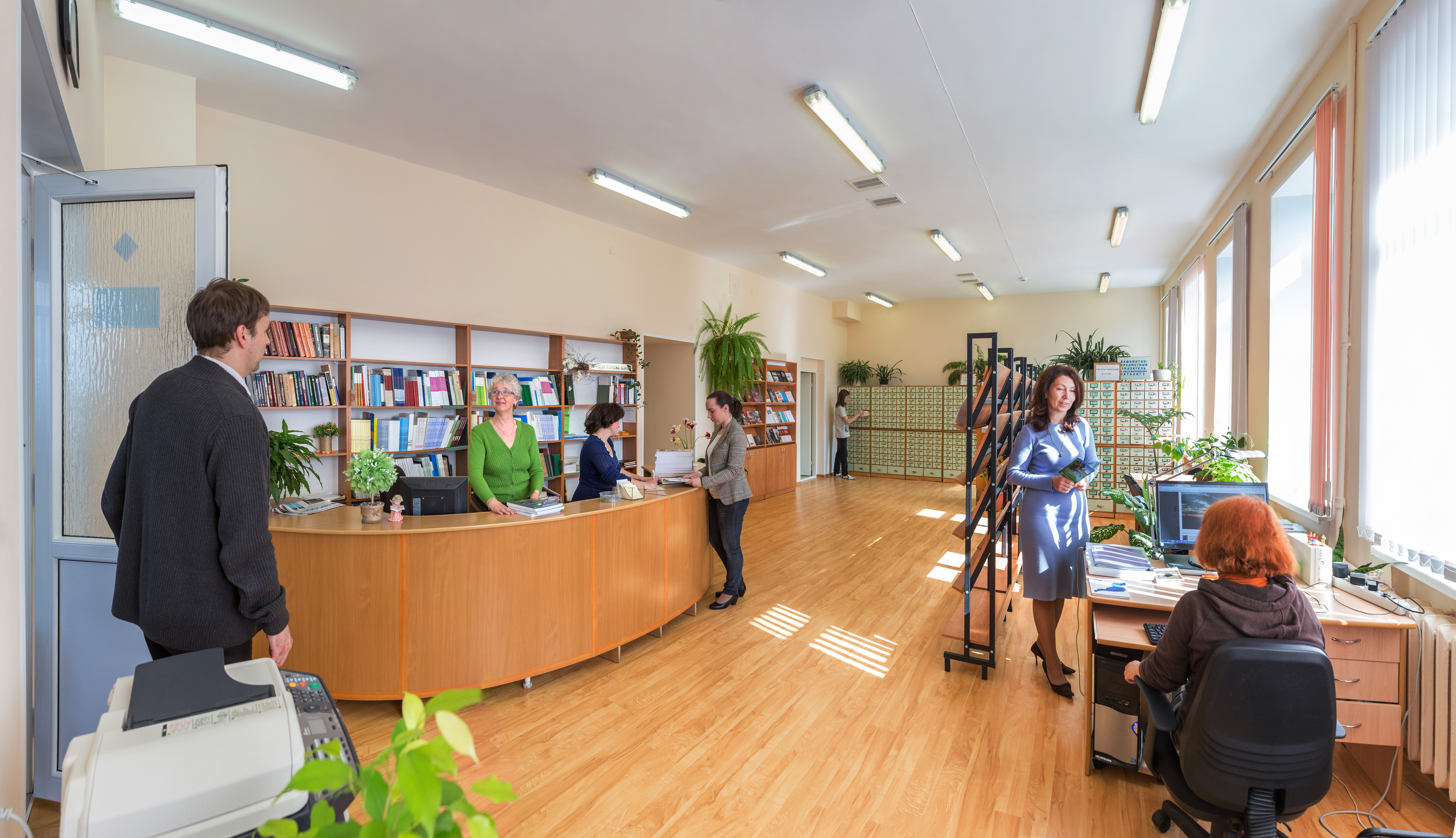
Scientific library of KarRC RAS, 2015

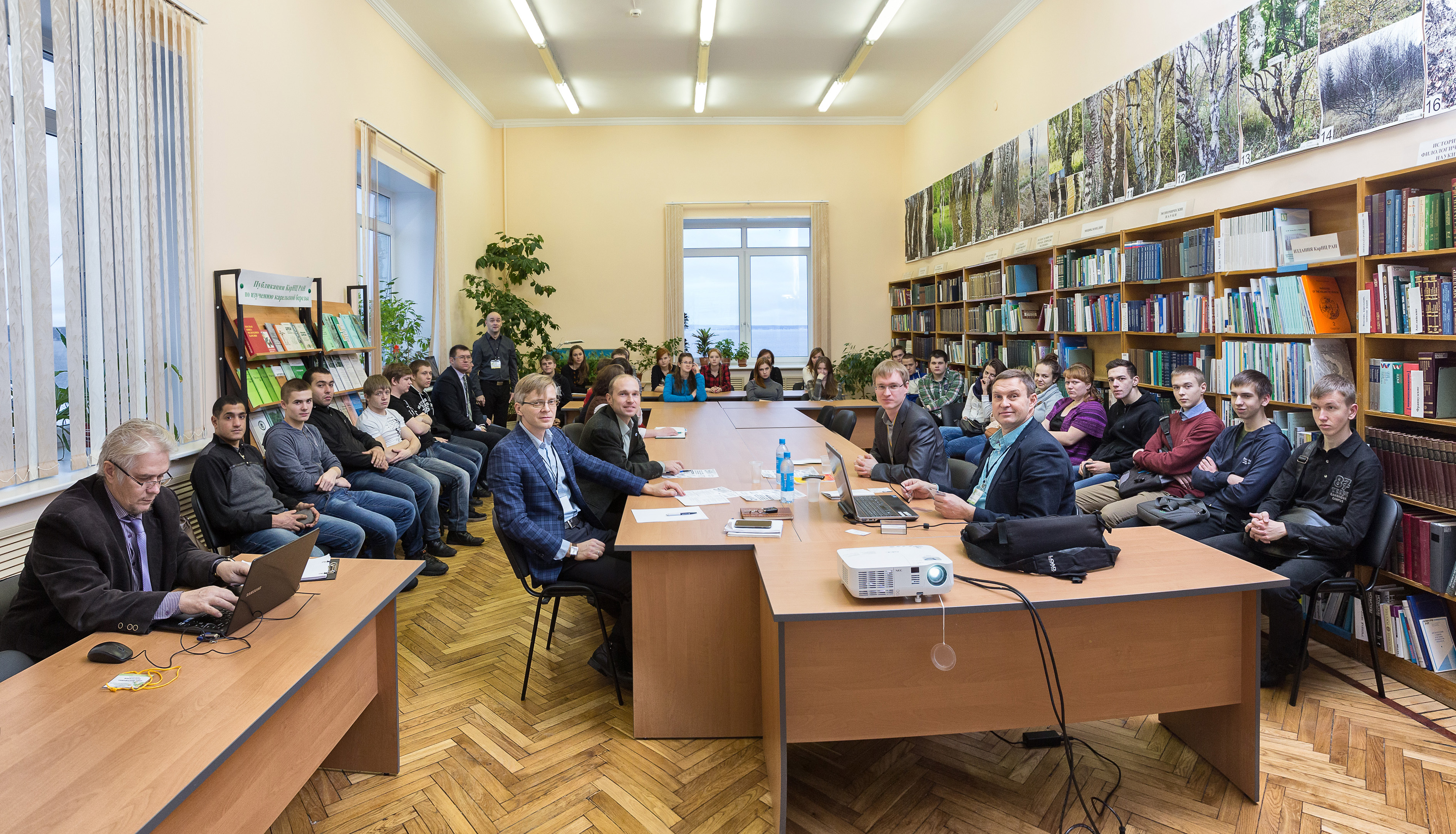
Reading room of the Scientific Library of Karelian Research Centre of RAS, 2015.

The Library was founded in 1946 to serve scientists working at the Karelian-Finnish Research Facility of the Academy of Sciences of the USSR. Its first director was S. P. Guima (1946—1953). In the following 19 years the library was headed by V. N. Yakovleva (1953—1972). In the 1970s, when the Library for Natural Sciences (LNS) was being established, KarRC RAS Scientific Library was also included in the RAS LNS centralized library system. For many years (1972—1992) the Scientific Library was headed by O. G. Satsuk. The main priority for the library was to supply KarRC RAS scientists with as much as possible relevant information from abroad. International book exchange was arranged through the Academy of Sciences of the USSR Library. In the 1970s the library got the chance to be included in the Interlibrary Loan (ILL) system to order literature from other libraries. A regular activity was the exhibitions of new arrivals to ease and expedite access to the books. Literature exhibitions have accompanied all large scientific conferences, symposia and seminars. Since 1954, the catalogue of publications by KarRC RAS staff has been maintained. In 1995 computerization of the library began, and the electronic catalogue was established based on computer technology. The electronic catalogue includes information on books and other types of documents in Russian and other languages in stock at KarRC RAS Scientific Library. Bibliographic entries are formatted according to RUSMARC. The electronic catalogue comprises the following databases:

- Catalogue of articles (since 2003) — bibliographic entries for articles from collected volumes, journals and newspapers acquired by the library since 2003 (partially also earlier)
- Publications by KarRC RAS staff (since 1987) — bibliographic entries for publications by KarRC RAS staff available at the Scientific Library
- Summaries of PhD theses — summaries of PhD and DSc theses received by the Scientific Library;
- Local lore catalogue (since 1987)
- Journal articles since 2003 (ordered through EDD) - bibliographic entries for journal articles since 2003 missing from KarRC RAS Scientific Library stock
- Journals (since 1996) – bibliographic entries and availability information on Russian-language journals since 1996

With the Internet on stage, bringing the possibility to use RAS LNS e-resources, libraries of the LNS network gained access to full-text journal versions of foreign publishers — Elsevier, Springer, Kluwer, Blackwel, Academic Press, etc. KarRC RAS Scientific Library jumped at this opportunity and logged on to eLIBRARY.ru. KarRC RAS employees gained access to electronic versions of publications. The "Electronic document delivery" programme offers the library's subscribers the chance to get copies of papers from the stock of other libraries of Karelia and Russia.

To preserve and enable access to publications by KarRC RAS staff the ‘KarRC RAS Repository’ was launched in 2015. The Repository is based on EPrints freeware and is available online.

=== Scientific Archives ===
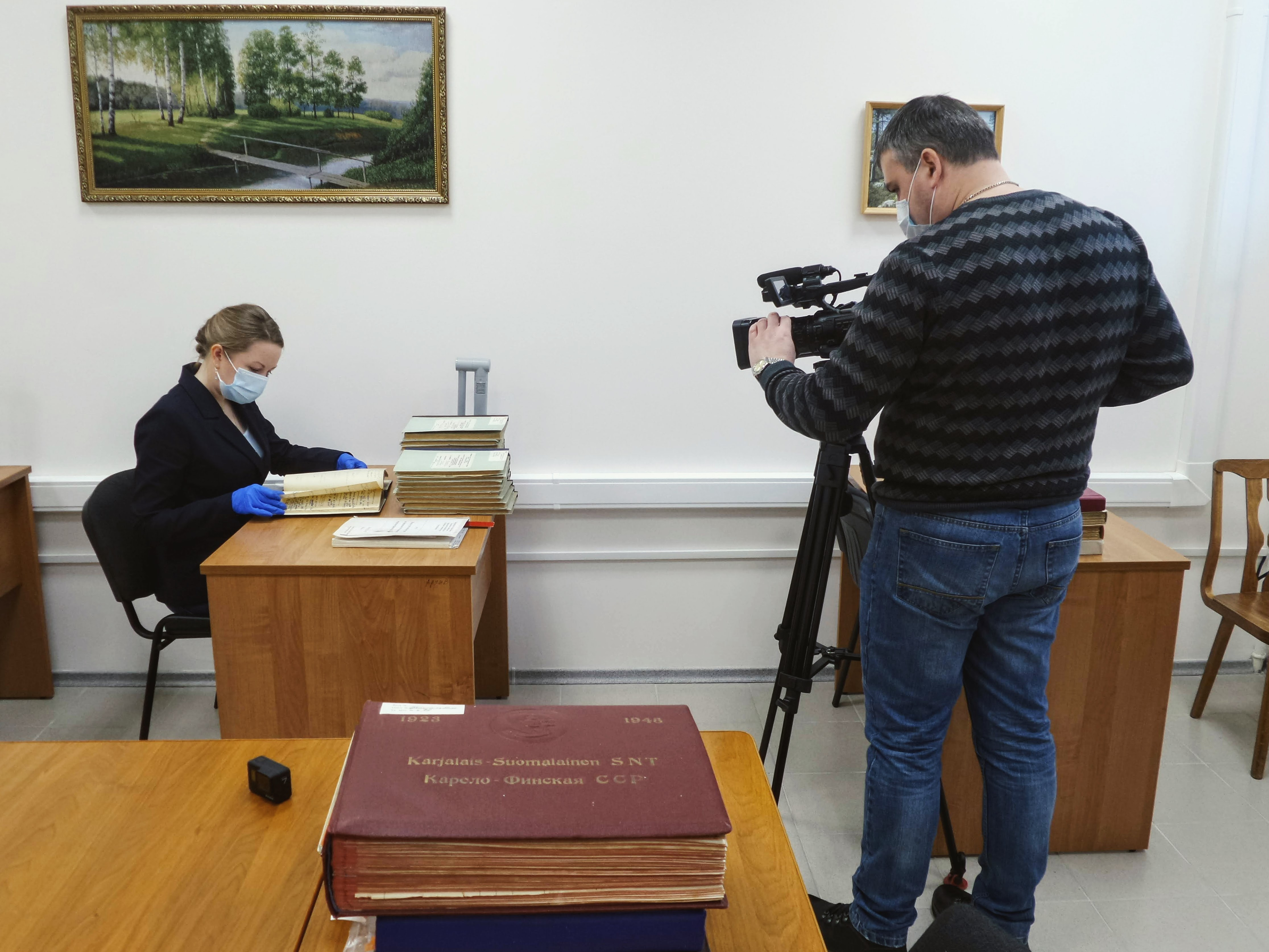
An employee of the research center works with the archive materials. Shooting a reportage for the Karelia State Television and Radio Broadcasting Company, 2021.

The constitution of the archives began in 1931 at KRI and continued after its re-organization into KRIC. The archives were made up of general workflow documents and scientific materials on all the institute's research areas. Scientific materials generated by expeditions carried out in Karelia since 1927 by Moscow and Leningrad universities were also submitted to the archives. In one of its resolutions, Presidium of the Academy of Sciences of the USSR suggested drawing up the scientific archives as a support unit with permanent staff starting 1952. A substantial part of the records in the Archives are scientific documents portraying the key lines of scientific development in Karelia and the activities of KarRC RAS institutions. The Archives contain a collection of folklore records of the Russian and Finnic nations (Karelian, Finnish, Sami), which are part of Karelia's heritage, as well as collections of 15th-19th cc. hand-written documents portraying the socio-economic relations and daily life of peasants and Pomors, the history of monasteries. The Scientific Archives now continue building up and systematizing their storage, and capacitate utilization of the documents in the activities of KarRC RAS institutes and units.

==== Digital library of 15th-19th cc. hand-written documents ====
In 2013 a project for the preservation and study of the historical and cultural heritage of the peoples inhabiting the Russian North was launched at the KarRC RAS Scientific Archives. Its primary goal is to secure the preservation of the originals of 15th-19th cc. hand-written documents, and at the same time to enable wide (online) access to them for researchers, digitalize the documents, create the electronic resource for users, and introduce into scientific discourse the set of documents on the history of the stated period, which have not been previously used by historians and remained largely unknown to the general public. The project activities included preparation of scientific descriptions and scanning of hand-written archival documents, including translation of titles from the Old Slavonic to the contemporary Russian language, brief description of the documents, generation of the electronic archive for digital storage of the scanned documents and their retrieval.

The repository of the KarRC RAS Scientific Archives was established using the EPrints system. This system permits creating and maintaining repositories with a required structure and set of metadata for storing collections of electronic documents, and provides a ready-make toolkit for filling in the repository and controlling access to its contents. The user interface in the original version of the software is in English, but the set of language options can be expanded, so an add-on to EPrints enabling the Russian language was developed.

The digital library of 15th-19th cc. hand-written documents is available online.

=== Editorial and Publishing Department ===
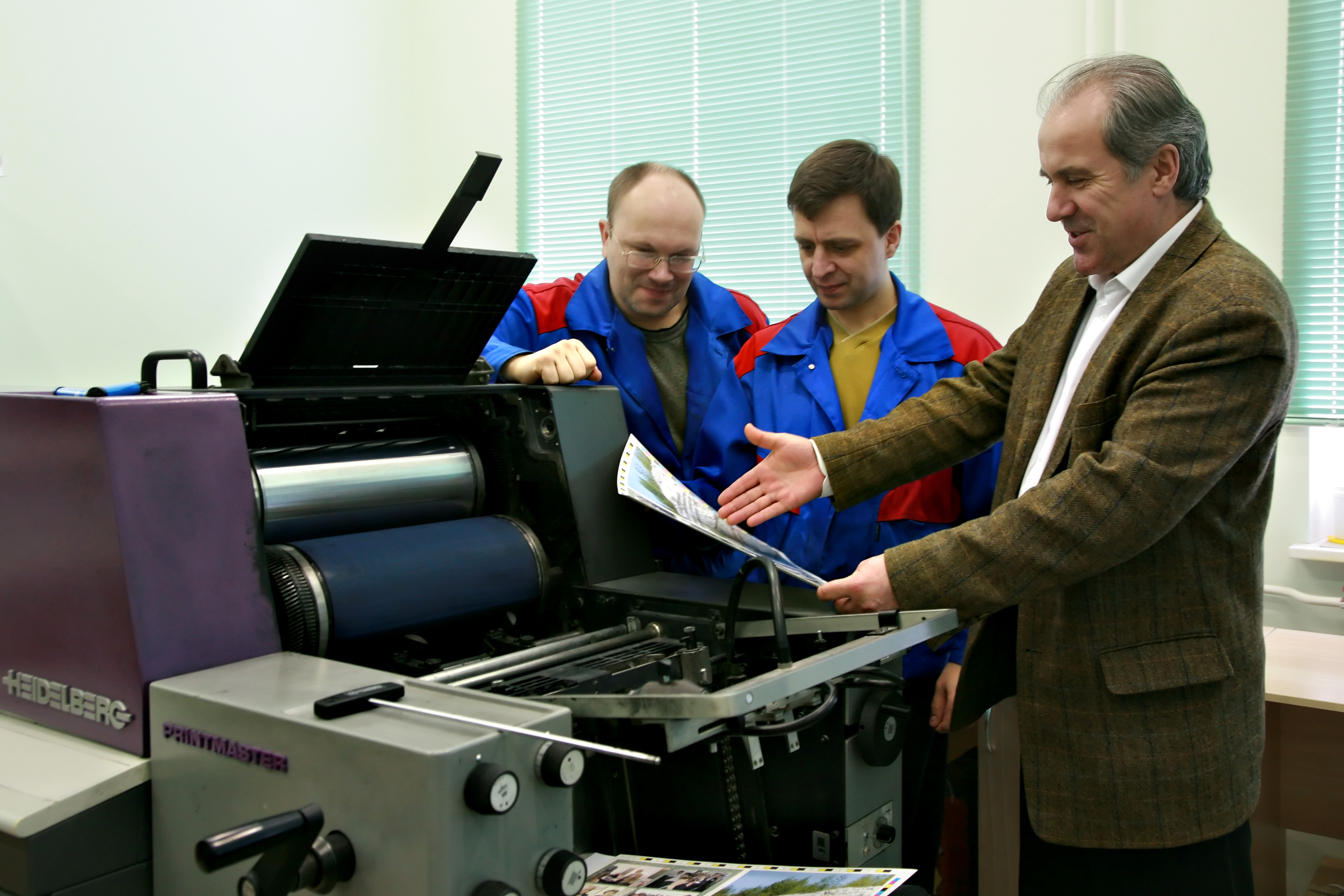
Editorial and Publishing Department of KarRC RAS. Head of department Alexander Seleznev, 2008

The publishing section was established in 1948 to invigorate the organization's publishing activities. S. S. Shleymovich was the first to head it. In 1968, as the amount of publications by the Karelian Branch of the Academy of Sciences of the USSR grew substantially, the publishing section was transformed into the Editorial and Publishing Department (EPD). In 1971 the EPD became authorized to publish the journal of proceedings of the Karelian Branch. In 1973 the instant printing shop was set up to publish collected volumes and monographic books without having to engage external book publishers. The number of limited circulation editions (express publication of research results, pre-prints of conference papers and abstracts, etc.) increased remarkably. In 1992 the Editorial and Publishing Department and the instant printing shop were merged into one unit to promote the efficiency of their operation. The time period from manuscript submission to final product became much shorter, the entire publishing process was optimized. A new phase in EPD development started in the 1990s with the onset of the computer era. Technical facilities of the editorial group were updated. Layout and design were computerized. Through renovation of the publishing process the quality of the printed products was notably improved, their volumes enlarged and the preparation and production cycle shortened. The EPD now implements the entire book publishing cycle. The principal concern for the EPD is to produce its editions so that they meet all modern standards.

=== Patent Department ===
The department was established in 1976 to enable utilization of the available scientific potential in dealing with practical tasks in Karelia. The high level of practical (applied) developments required that they were legally protected. The first head of the department was G. B. Lavrenenko. The Patent Department coordinates the patent- and license-related activities of KarRC RAS institutes, provides legal, information and advisory/training support to scientific research activities. The Patent Department provides patenting information of relevance for scientific research and developments, takes part in patent search related to KarRC RAS research areas, including retrieval, selection, systematization of patent documentation, evaluation of the technical level of the research object, analysis of the results of patent search. The database of inventions that have been applied in industry, agriculture, forestry and in basic research has been created. The Patent Department works together with scientific units to promote and market the inventions, for instance by preparing them for display at exhibitions and fairs.

== Institutes ==
Karelian Research Centre RAS comprises the following academy institutes:

- Institute of Linguistics, Literature and History (1930)
- Institute of Biology (1953)
- Forest Research Institute (1957)
- Institute of Geology (1961)
- Northern Water Problems Institute (1991)
- Institute of Economics (1996)
- Institute of Applied Mathematical Research (1999)

== Leadership ==
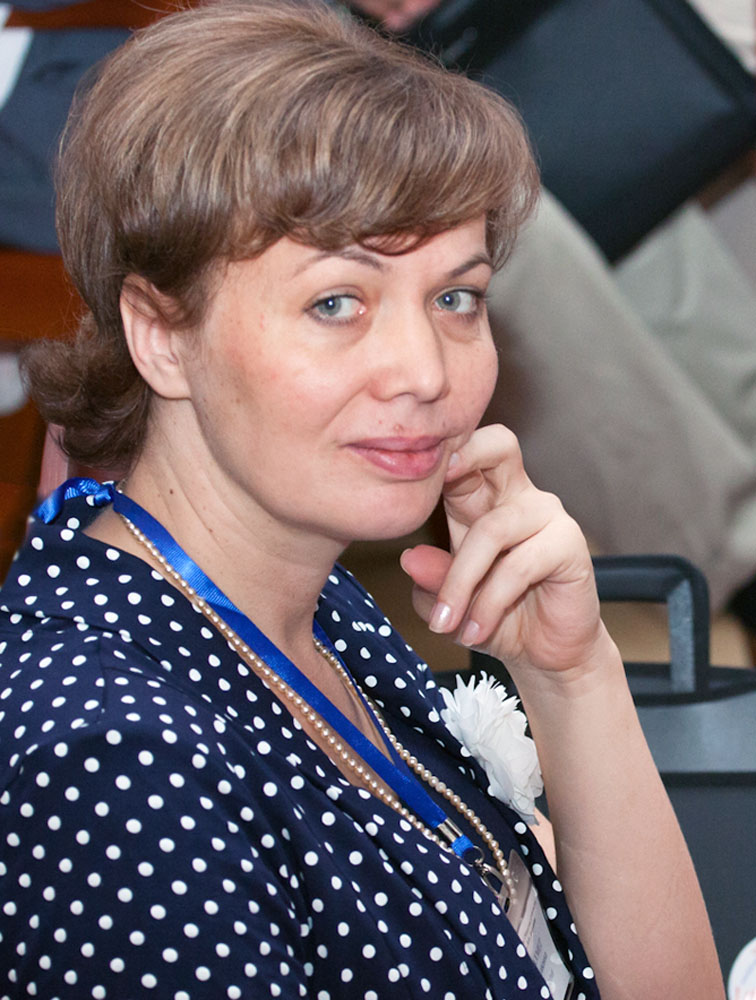
Olga Bakhmet

- А. A. Polkanov (1946—1947)
- I. I. Gorsky (1947—1952)
- I. I. Sykiäinen (1952—1957)
- V. S. Slodkevich (1957—1960)
- V. P. Dadykin (1960—1962)
- V. I. Yermakov (1962—1964, 1967)
- N. I. Pjavchenko (1968—1976)
- V. A. Sokolov (1976—1986)
- I. M. Nesterenko (1987—1991)
- A. F. Titov (1991-2017)
- O. N. Bakhmet (since 2017)

== Links ==
- Karelian Research Centre of RAS WebSite
- Hohlov, Sergej (2013-02-07). "Interview with the President of the Karelian Research Centre RAS Alexandr Titov". Karelia. Petrozavodsk: Karelia.
- Slukovsky, Zahar (2012-02-09). "Road to the Truth". Karelia. Petrozavodsk: Karelia.
- Makarihin, Vladimir (2005-03-31). "Subsoil researcher". Karelia. Petrozavodsk: Karelia.
- "Charter of the Karelian Research Centre of the Russian Academy of Sciences". FASO. 2014-12-26.
