= Adolf Taimi =

Finnish communist revolutionary

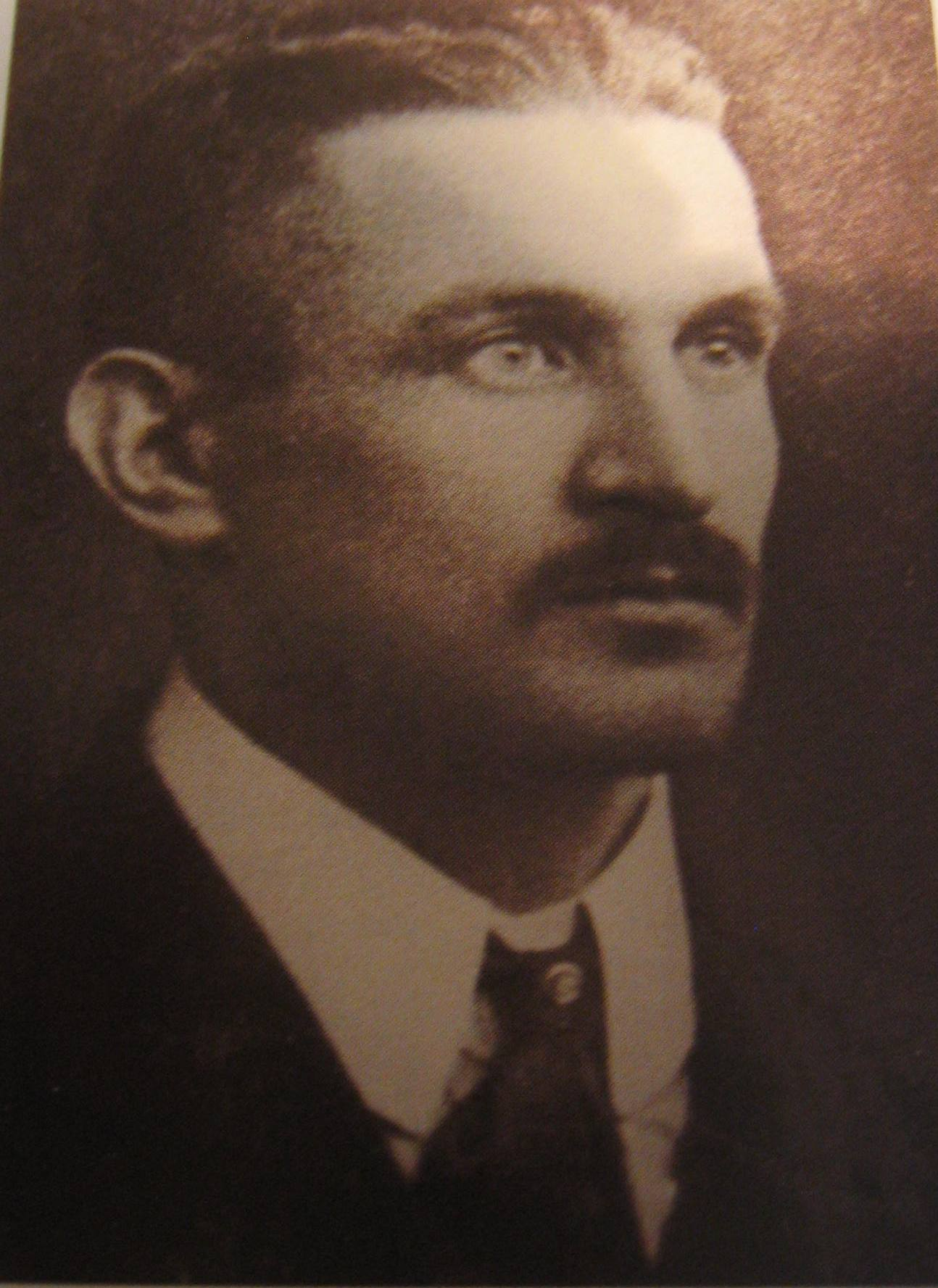

Chairman of the Supreme Soviet of the Karelo-Finnish SSR
- In office 1947–1955
- Preceded by: Nikolai Sorokin
- Succeeded by: Ivan Sogiyainen

Personal details
- Born: 21 September 1881 Saint Petersburg, Russian Empire
- Died: 1 November 1955 (aged 74) Petrozavodsk, Karelo-Finnish SSR, Soviet Union
- Citizenship: Soviet Union Finland (previously) Russian Empire (previously)
- Party: CPSU; CPF
- Other political affiliations: RSDLP
- Awards: Order of Lenin

Adolf Pietarinpoika Taimi (21 September 1881 – 1 November 1955) was a Finnish-Soviet Bolshevik and a member of the People's Delegation during the Finnish Civil War. After the civil war Taimi fled to Soviet Russia where he was one of the founding members of the Communist Party of Finland.

== Life ==
Adolf Taimi was born and raised in Saint Petersburg. He joined the Russian Social Democratic Labour Party in 1902.

As a member of the party's Bolshevik wing, Taimi was first arrested in 1906. He was deported to the city of Nikolsky, Leningrad Oblast. Later he fled back to Saint Petersburg where he met Nadezhda Krupskaya, who sent him to Helsinki because of his linguistic skills.

In Helsinki, Taimi worked in a Russian Army shipyard and was active in the Bolshevik Military Committee. He also had contact with Finnish Social Democrat radical circles.

In 1912 Taimi was arrested again and exiled to Siberia for four years. During his exile Taimi studied Marxist literature. After the February Revolution Taimi returned to Saint Petersburg, where the Bolsheviks sent him back to Helsinki in April 1917. In Finland, Taimi's mission was to make contact with Bolshevik soldiers and Finnish Social Democrats. He took part in the Social Democratic Party conference in June and November.

Taimi urged Finns to revolution in his speeches. In December, he encouraged the Labour Guards to operate independently if necessary. In January, Taimi was elected an "additional member" of the party's committee. He worked all the while in close cooperation with the Bolshevik-led Helsinki Council.

During the Civil War Taimi was the delegate for internal affairs of the Finnish People's Delegation in which he had connections to the Red Guards. When the delegate for Internal Affairs, Supreme Commander of the Red Guard Eero Haapalainen, was deposed because of heavy drinking, his replacements were Taimi, Eino Rahja and Evert Eloranta.

After the end of the civil war, Taimi fled to Soviet Russia where he was one of the founding members of the Communist Party of Finland in 1918. In 1923 he allied with Otto Wille Kuusinen and Kullervo Manner against Eino Rahjaa who was accused of being unsuitable for the party leadership. He was elected to the Central Committee of the Communist Party in 1924.

Taimi worked in the underground organizations of the Finnish Communist Party in Finland in 1922–1923 and 1927–1928. He was also active in the Comintern. He was arrested in Finland in 1928 and received a long prison sentence.

Taimi was released after the Winter War along with Toivo Antikainen. Both were deported back to the Soviet Union. Taimi settled in the Karelo-Finnish Soviet Socialist Republic. Occupied by prison time and disputes with other Finnish Communists, he was not able to rise to the higher ranks of the Communist Party of Finland. Taimi published his memoirs in 1954 in Finnish.
