= Kullervo Manner =

Finnish politician (1880–1939)

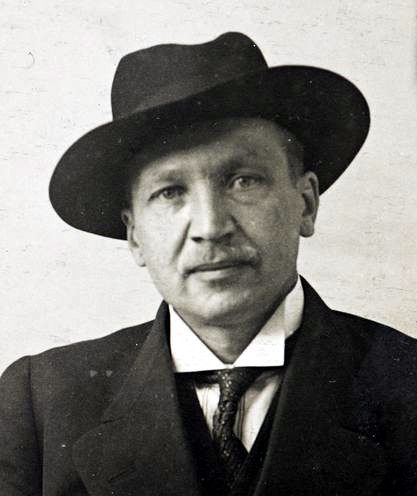

Chairman of the Finnish People's Delegation of the Finnish Socialist Workers' Republic
- In office 29 January 1918 – 25 April 1918
- Preceded by: Position established
- Succeeded by: Position abolished

Speaker of the Parliament
- In office 4 April 1917 – 31 October 1917
- Preceded by: Kaarlo Juho Ståhlberg
- Succeeded by: Johannes Lundson

Leader of the Finnish Communist Party
- In office 1920–1935
- Preceded by: Yrjö Sirola
- Succeeded by: Hannes Mäkinen

Leader of the Finnish Social Democratic Party
- In office 1917–1918
- Preceded by: Matti Paasivuori
- Succeeded by: Väinö Tanner

Personal details
- Born: Kullervo Achilles Manner; 12 October 1880 Kokemäki, Grand Duchy of Finland, Russian Empire
- Died: 15 January 1939 (aged 58) Ukhta-Pechora, Russian SFSR, Soviet Union
- Party: SDP; SKP
- Spouse(s): Olga Arjanne (divorced 1925); Hanna Malm

Kullervo Achilles Manner (Finnish: [ˈkulːerʋo ˈmɑnːer]; Russian: Куллерво Густавович Маннер, romanized: Kullervo Gustavovich Manner; 12 October 1880 – 15 January 1939) was a Finnish and Soviet politician. He was one of the leaders of the Finnish Socialist Workers' Republic.

Manner was a member of the Finnish parliament, serving as its speaker in 1917. He was also the chairman of the Social Democratic Party of Finland between 1917 and 1918. During the Finnish Civil War, he led the Finnish People's Delegation, a leftist alternative to the established Finnish government. After the war, he escaped to Soviet Russia, where he co-founded the Finnish Communist Party. It is said if the Red Guards had won the Civil War, Manner might have risen to the position of the "Leader of the Red Finland".

== Early life ==
Manner was born a minister's son in Kokemäki. His father Gustaf Manner worked in various parishes, including those of Lappi and Vampula. Kullervo's mother was Alma Limón, daughter of pastor Johannes Limón. After graduating from high school in 1900, Manner worked as a journalist in Porvoo and later in Helsinki. In 1906, he founded a newspaper called Työläinen ('worker') in Porvoo, of which he was the editor-in-chief until 1909; an article published in the newspaper in 1909 brought him the following year, already as a Member of Parliament, a six-month prison sentence for a lèse majesté (a lesser crime similar to treason) against Nicholas II in 1911. He was elected to the Finnish Parliament as a Social Democrat from Uusimaa in 1910 and 1917. He was appointed Speaker of the Parliament in 1917. Manner's brother Arvo Manner was governor of Viipuri and Kymi provinces from the 1920s to the 1950s.

Manner married Olga Arjanne (Seger until 1906) on 26 October 1908, at the local register office of Porvoo. From 1906, they worked at the same time in the Työläinen's editorial office and lived in the house where the editorial office was located.

== Civil War ==
On 28 January 1918, during the Finnish Civil War, Manner was appointed Chairman of the Finnish People's Delegation. On 10 April 1918, Manner was appointed commander-in-chief of the Red Guards as well as head of state of its short-lived government, The People's Deputation. He was given dictatorial powers. At the time, the Red Guards led by Manner ruled for several months in Helsinki and other southern cities, while the White Guards led by General Mannerheim and the Senate had control of northern Finland.

== In Soviet Russia ==
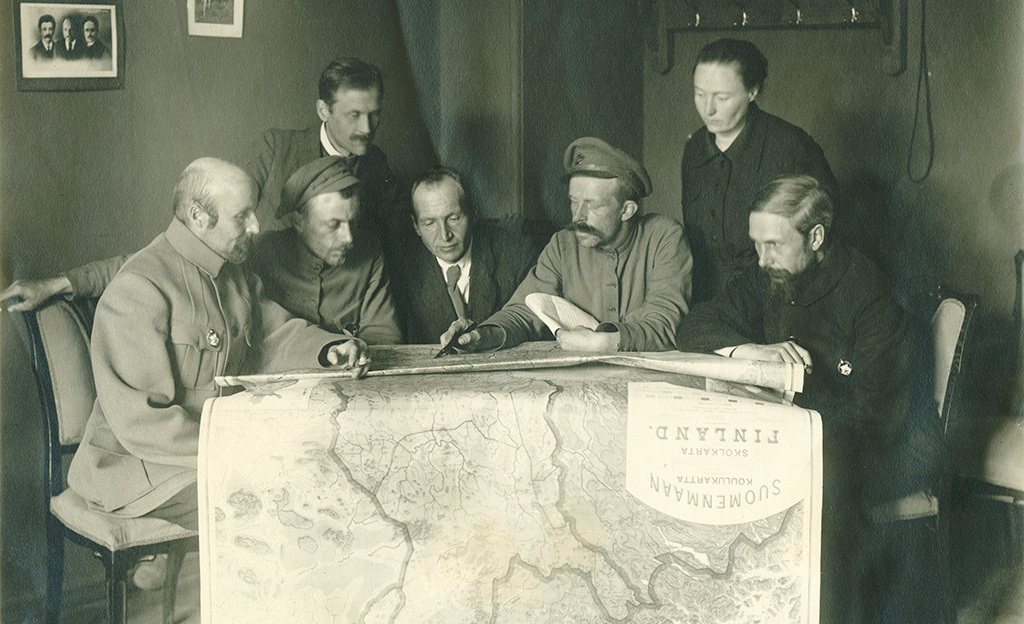
Central Committee of the exile Communist Party of Finland (SKP) in Moscow, 1920. From left to right: K. M. Evä, Jukka Rahja, Jalo Kohonen, Kullervo Manner, Eino Rahja, Mandi Sirola and Yrjö Sirola.

After the civil war, Manner fled to Soviet Russia where he became the second chairman of the Finnish Communist Party (SKP) after Yrjö Sirola. He also became an official of the Comintern.

Manner and his wife Hanna Malm's fall from grace began in 1929 when they lost a briefcase containing secret documents while in Stockholm. The Swedish police raided Manner and Malm's apartment based on a tip given by the Finnish state police Etsivä keskuspoliisi, and secured the briefcase, which led to the arrest and prosecution of sixty-five communist agents in Finland.

The following year saw the rise of the far-right Lapua Movement in Finland. While many communists believed it provided an opportunity to recruit more workers to their cause and incite them to revolution, Manner remained passive. Comintern reprimanded the party for inaction, and while Manner personally survived with minor criticism, Hanna Malm was excluded from the central committee.

Manner and Malm, frustrated by the party's shortcomings, wanted to thoroughly analyze the reasons for the failure of the 1918 revolution. The theory they came up with pointed the finger at Manner himself and other leaders of the Finnish Social Democratic Party (SDP), who had reacted to the revolutionary moment too slowly, as well as at the Bolsheviks. In the Treaty of Brest-Litovsk the Bolsheviks had agreed not to meddle in the Finnish Civil War, and left the Finnish communists without the aid that had previously been promised.

Hanna Malm made the pair's theory public in 1932. The reaction of the SKP leadership was severe. Manner retracted his opinion quickly, but Malm directly named Comintern Executive Committee member Otto Wille Kuusinen as one of the former SDP leaders in question. She was exiled to Uhtua in Soviet Karelia for a year.

Manner was dismissed from most of his duties in May 1934. He continued to work as a Comintern rapporteur on Latin American affairs until July 1935.

=== Imprisonment and death ===
In 1935, Manner and Malm were arrested after a raid in their apartment found weapons and books by renounced Bolsheviks Nikolai Bukharin, Leon Trotsky and Grigory Zinoviev. Both were sentenced to the labour camps. Malm drowned herself at the Solovki prison camp on 8 August 1937. Manner was taken to the Ukhtpechlag Gulag labor camp, where he died on 15 January 1939. The official cause of death was tuberculosis. According to professor of history Alexander Popov, the real cause of death could be attributed to radiation sickness, which Manner could have received, since he worked with water containing radium.

=== Rehabilitation ===
Manner was rehabilitated in 1957.

== Political and military offices ==
Political offices
Preceded by Kaarlo Juho Ståhlberg	Speaker of the Parliament of Finland; 1917	Succeeded by Johannes Lundson
Preceded by –	Chairman of the Finnish People's Delegation; 1918	Succeeded by –
Military offices
Preceded by Evert Eloranta; Eino Rahja; Adolf Taimi	Commander-in-chief of the Red Guards; 10 April 1918 – 25 April 1918	Succeeded by –

== See also ==
- Eero Haapalainen

== Sources ==
- Veli-Pekka Leppänen: Herraspojan harharetki päättyi joukkohautaan Uralilla (in Finnish) – Helsingin Sanomat, July 18, 2017. Retrieved September 27, 2021.

=== Works cited ===
- Keränen, Jorma; Tiainen, Jorma; Ahola, Matti; Ahola, Veikko; Frey, Stina; Lempinen, Jorma; Ojanen, Eero; Paakkonen, Jari; Talja, Virpi; Väänänen, Juha (1992), Suomen itsenäistymisen kronikka, Jyväskylä: Gummerus, ISBN 951-20-3800-5
- Lackman, Matti (2017), Kullervo Manner: Kumouksellisen muotokuva, Somero: Amanita, ISBN 978-952-5330-84-7
- Manninen, Ohto (1993b), Taistelevat osapuolet. In: Manninen, O. (ed.) Itsenäistymisen vuodet 1917–1920, II Taistelu vallasta, Helsinki: Valtion painatuskeskus, pp. 96–177, ISBN 951-37-0728-8
- Manninen*, Turo (1993c), Tie sotaan. In: Manninen, O. (ed.) Itsenäistymisen vuodet 1917–1920, I Irti Venäjästä, Helsinki: Valtion painatuskeskus, pp. 398–432, ISBN 951-37-0727-X
- Tikka, Marko (2014), "Warfare & Terror in 1918", in Tepora, T.; Roselius, A. (eds.), The Finnish Civil War 1918: History, Memory, Legacy, Leiden: Brill, pp. 90–118, ISBN 978-90-04-24366-8
- Upton, Anthony F. (1980), Vallankumous Suomessa 1917–1918, I, Jyväskylä: Gummerus, ISBN 951-26-1828-1
- Westerlund, Lars (2004b), Venäläissurmat Suomessa 1914–1922, 2.1. Sotatapahtumat 1918–1922, Helsinki: VNKJ 2/2004, Edita, ISBN 952-5354-44-X
