= Supreme Soviet of the Karelo-Finnish Soviet Socialist Republic =

Supreme Soviet of the Karelo-Finnish SSR Karjalais-suomalainen SNT:n Korkein Neuvosto Верховный Совет Карело-Финской ССР
- (Karelo-Finnish Soviet Socialist Republic) Karelo-Finnish SSR (1940-1956)
- Emblem of the Karelo-Finnish Soviet Socialist Republic

Type
- Type: Supreme Soviet

History
- Established: 1940
- Disbanded: 1956
- Preceded by: Supreme Soviet of the Karelian ASSR (ru)
- Succeeded by: Supreme Soviet of the Karelian ASSR (ru)

Leadership
- Chairman: Ivan Sogiyainen (last)

Elections
- Last election: 1955

The Supreme Soviet of the Karelo-Finnish SSR (Finnish: Karjalais-suomalainen SNT:n Korkein Neuvosto; Russian: Верховный Совет Карело-Финской ССР tr. Verkhovnyy Sovet Karelo-Finskoy SSR) was the highest organ of state authority of the Karelo-Finnish SSR. The Supreme Soviet of the Karelo-Finnish SSR was established in June 1940 when the third session of the First Convocation of the Supreme Soviet of the Karelian ASSR adopted the law of transforming the Karelian ASSR into the Karelo-Finnish SSR. The first elections of the Supreme Soviet of the Karelo-Finnish SSR took place on June 16, 1940, and the first session of the first convocation took place on November 8, 1940. The Supreme Soviet of the Karelo-Finnish SSR was disbanded in August 1956 when the Karelo-Finnish SSR was demoted to an autonomous soviet socialist republic on July 16, 1956.

== Convocations ==
- 1st Convocation of the Supreme Soviet of the Karelo-Finnish SSR (1940-1947)
- 2nd Convocation of the Supreme Soviet of the Karelo-Finnish SSR (1947-1951)
- 3rd Convocation of the Supreme Soviet of the Karelo-Finnish SSR (1951-1955)
- 4th Convocation of the Supreme Soviet of the Karelo-Finnish SSR (1955-1956)

== Chairmen of the Supreme Soviet ==
Portrait	Chairman	From	To
	Nikolai Sorokin	1940	1947
	Adolf Taimi	1947	1955
	Ivan Sogiyainen	1955	1956

== See also ==
- Autonomous Soviet Socialist Republics of the Soviet Union
- Supreme Soviet
- Russian Soviet Federative Socialist Republic
