= Yrjö Sirola =

Finnish politician and writer

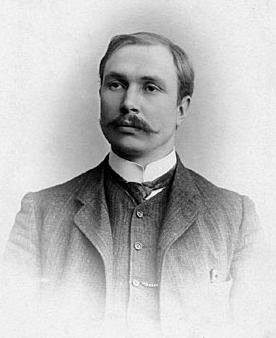
- Sirola in 1905

Minister of Foreign Affairs of the Finnish Socialist Workers' Republic
- In office January 28, 1918 – May 5, 1918
- Preceded by: Position established
- Succeeded by: Position abolished

Personal details
- Born: Yrjö Elias Sirén; November 8, 1876 Piikkiö, Russian Empire
- Died: March 18, 1936 (aged 59) Moscow, Soviet Union
- Cause of death: Stroke
- Resting place: Malmi Cemetery, Helsinki
- Party: Communist Party of Finland (1918-)
- Other political affiliations: Social Democratic Party of Finland (1903-1918)
- Education: Communist University of the National Minorities of the West
- Occupation: Politician, teacher

Yrjö Elias Sirola (né Sirén; 8 November 1876 – 18 March 1936) was a Finnish socialist politician, writer, teacher, and newspaper editor. He was prominent as an elected official in Finland, as minister of foreign affairs in the 1918 Finnish Socialist Workers' Republic, a founder of the Communist Party of Finland, and as a functionary of the Communist International.

== Background ==
Yrjö Esias Sirén was born 8 November 1876 in Piikkiö, Finland, then part of the Russian Empire. His father, Karl Gustaf Sirén, worked as a clergyman. Yrjö attended a lycée in Viipuri and then attended Rauma teachers' training college, from which he graduated in 1902.

== Career ==
Following completion of his studies he took a post as a teacher in Hattula.

=== Social Democratic Party (Finland) ===
Yrjö joined the Social Democratic Party in 1903. After a short stint on the staff of the liberal newspaper Kotkan Sanomat (Kotka News) in 1903, Yrjö moved to the city of Tampere to assume the editorship of the Kansan Lehti, a post which he occupied from 1904 to 1906. It is apparently during this period that he adopted the pseudonym Sirola, which he retained for the rest of his life. Sirola also served as editor of the Helsinki Työmies ("Workman") from 1906.

In 1905, Sirola was appointed as Secretary of the SDP, a role which enabled him to play an active part in the general strike of that year. An advocate of parliamentary methods during a revolutionary time, Sirola found himself out of step with a boisterous radical rank-and-file in the Social Democratic Party and withdrew his name from consideration in the elections for Secretary held at the party's 1906 national conference.

The Russian imperial government of Nicholas II managed to stabilize itself by 1907, defeating the radical opponents which threatened to topple it in the Revolution of 1905. Sirola remained active in the socialist movement following this defeat, gaining election to parliament and serving as deputy speaker in 1908 and 1909. Increased control by the Tsarist government over Finnish affairs in the aftermath of the revolution combined with a troubled personal financial situation moved Sirola to emigrate to the United States, however.

=== American years ===
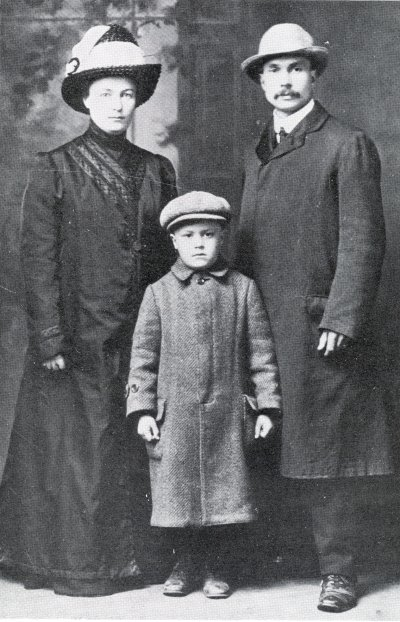
Yrjö Sirola with family in Hancock, Michigan (1913)

Arriving in America in 1909, Sirola followed previous Finnish immigrants in moving to the Upper Midwest region of the United States. Sirola landed a post as the director of the Finnish Socialist Federation's Work People's College in Smithville, Minnesota in 1910. Sirola would remain in that position until 1913.

Previously very much a parliamentarian in his political orientation, while in Minnesota Sirola begun to be influenced by the radical syndicalism espoused by the Industrial Workers of the World. He would support the left wing in the bitter factional dispute which in 1912 and 1913 split the more than 10,000 member Finnish Socialist organization in America. Amidst this rancor, Sirola returned home to Finland in 1913.

=== Finnish Revolution ===
Back in Finland, Sirola resumed activity as a functionary of the Social Democratic Party, teaching in party schools and writing for the party press. In 1916 he was elected the SDP's Executive Committee and in 1917 he was returned to office as a parliamentary deputy. Within the SDP Sirola was a leader of the radical left wing of the party who supported the Bolshevik Revolution in Russia in November 1917 and who sought to emulate Lenin's results in Finland.

On November 11, 1917, Sirola arrived in Petrograd with his comrade Evert Huttunen, where he met with Lenin at Smolnyi about how radicals in Finland might aid the Bolshevik uprising and about revolutionary prospects in Finland. Lenin was fearful that troops loyal to the Provisional Government of Alexander Kerensky would be pulled from Finland to crush the Bolshevik uprising. He urged the Finns to initiate a general strike in an effort to emulate the Bolsheviks in their seizure of power.

Sirola and Huttunen took the opposite impression from this meeting with Lenin than the one which the Russian leader had intended, however, interpreting the Bolshevik grip on power as being extremely tenuous and believing it dangerous for the Finnish SDP to build its plans around the survival of the Bolshevik government. This cautious perspective was shared by the SDP's parliamentary group, but radicals in the party pushed the revolution forward nonetheless, calling a general strike for November 14. Sirola was one of three SDP leaders to exercise general control over the strike arrangements.

As one historian has noted:

The instructions for the conduct of the strike required that in each community a revolutionary council would be set up with full authority over all workers' organizations, above all the Red Guard, which was to be the executive arm of the workers' power. The Red Guard would work with the militia in keeping order, mount guards and patrols, arrest dangerous enemies of the workers, confiscate liquor stocks, and stop the spread of rumors. The instruction ended with the standard injunction that "during the general strike, order and discipline must be preserved irreproachably. It must be remember that revolution is not the same as outrage and anarchy."

Each community experienced the general strike that launched the Finnish Revolutionary Government in a different way, ranging from complete inaction to Red Guards nailing shut the doors of stubborn businessmen who defied the strike. The success of the action generated pressure among the working class to move to a full seizure of power in emulation of the Bolshevik seizure of power a week earlier. Sirola still held that the armed seizure of power was premature, however. He argued at a meeting of the SDP's Revolutionary Council convened in the early morning hours of November 16 that "the position in Russian and the eventual attack of the Germans" was decisive and that the prudent course of action was to pressure parliament into making concessions, guaranteeing action on food and granting and back wages to those who participated in the general strike action. The parliamentary delegates taking such a cautious position were in a minority, however, and at 5:00 am the Revolutionary Council voted 14–11 in favor of seizing power. The Revolutionary Council was reorganized, with Sirola and the parliamentary group (the minority) refusing to take part. Two hours later their nerve of the majority failed them, however, and the newly reorganized Revolutionary Council backed away from armed insurrection, in favor of an aggressive push for concessions from the bourgeois parties. As Anthony Upton notes:

In effect Sirola had won and emerged as the leading figure on the morning of 16 November; his policy, that of stepping up the pressure until they got a government that would satisfy the basic demands on food and guarantee immunity from reprisal, was adopted. On his suggestion, they decided to take over the railways, close the law courts, and compel all the agencies of central and local government to cease activity... There was also an attempt to satisfy the restlessness of the Red Guard by assigning to it a new task: It was to begin systematic searches for hidden stocks of food, if possible with the authorization of local Food Boards, but if necessary without...

On their own authority the Red Guard began arresting and jailing bourgeois notables, however, and the drive towards revolution careened forwards. On November 18, a group of angry railway workers came to see the SDP leaders, telling party leader Kullervo Manner to his face "you have betrayed the workers, the strike must go on until a socialist government is established." The Strike Committee met that same night and declared in favor of a socialist government and that the Red Guard must stay armed until this was achieved and "all power is taken into the workers' hands." The conservative government headed by P. E. Svinhufvud refused to make concessions to the socialist opposition, with parliament voting down proposals to lower the voting age and to grant the vote immediately to tenant farmers. A new cabinet was put together by Svinhufvud which did not include a single socialist, a body confirmed by parliament on November 24 by a vote of 100 to 80. Parliamentary maneuvering was met with spontaneous armed actions by Red Guard in various localities in which some 34 people were killed, mostly victims of Red Guard violence. This increasing hostility created an impenetrable barrier between the two sides. With the conservative parliamentary majority intent upon disarming the Red Guards and establishing a monarchical form of government, the nation descended into civil war.

On January 19, 1918, a pitched battle broke out between Red Guards and the conservative Protective Corps of Viipuri, which Russian troops coming to the aid of their allies in the fight. Fighting spread with the Red Guards beginning the seizure of Helsinki on the night of January 27/28. White forces headed by General Mannerheim controlled the northernmost five-sixths of Finland, while the Reds controlled the southernmost region, containing approximately half of the country's population and including the cities of Pori, Turku, Tampere, Riihimäki, Helsinki, Kotka, and Viipuri. A Finnish Revolutionary Government was declared, in which Sirola served as Commissar of Foreign Affairs.

The civil war proved to be a one-sided affair, with the superior officer corps and materiel of the White forces under Mannerheim winning the day. By the spring of 1918, with the Red government clearly on the road to military defeat at the hands of the Whites, Sirola coordinated the evacuation of the leadership of the revolutionary government. On April 7, a meeting of Finnish socialists took place in Petrograd, at which various settlement plans were discussed, with Sirola setting up an office in Petrograd to look after the refugees already beginning to arrive three days later. Evacuation became official policy on April 14, 1918. Historian Anthony Upton notes:

The choices before the socialist leaders were unconditional surrender, a glorious fight to the finish in Finland ending in almost certain martyrdom, or a prudent withdrawal with a view to a future return. It was not a difficult choice to make, and did not mean, as their detractors had always claimed, that they were weak and cowardly men who betrayed their faithful but deluded followers. They were Marxists, and could see their defeat as only an episode in the class war, which always continued, and their duty was not to indulge in glorious gestures of defiance, but to persevere in the struggle.

The Finnish Socialist Republic fell on May 15, 1918.

=== Soviet years ===
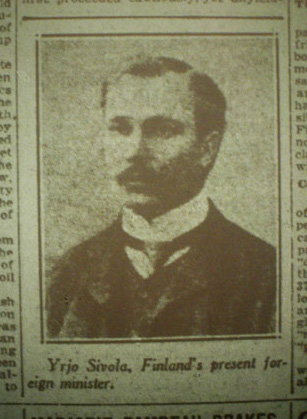
Yrjö Sirola (1918)

Sirola was involved in establishing the Finnish Communist Party at the end of August 1918 in Moscow. The governing Central Committee of this new organization established itself in Petrograd, where it launched a daily newspaper and magazines in Finnish and Swedish and put into print over 40 pamphlets during its first year. Underground organizations of this new party were established inside Finland, where they distributed literature and conducted propaganda work.

In January 1919, he was the Finnish CP's signatory to the call for the formation of the Communist International and in March of that year he was a delegate to the founding convention, held early in March 1919. At the founding convention of the Comintern, Sirola delivered the report on the Finnish revolution:

Although not adequately prepared politically or militarily for such a struggle, the workers held their ground at the front for three months, while at the same time doing a great deal behind the lines to organize social and economic life.

"That first revolution by the Finnish proletariat was defeated. The willingness to sacrifice and the courage of the comrades, men and women, who fought in the Red Guard and the invaluable aid given by our Russian comrades were not enough to repel the onslaught launched by the international gangs of White Guards led by Finnish, Swedish, German, and Russian officers. At the end of April, German imperialism tipped the balance by committing regular army troops to the fight. The White Guards were then able to block the plan to evacuate the revolution's best surviving forces to Russia.

In the wake of the Finnish uprising and its bloody aftermath, in which over 11,000 prisoners of the victorious Whites died of starvation, disease, or execution, Sirola had clearly cast his lot with revolutionary methods as opposed to parliamentarism:

For too long, we...were imbued with the ideology of a 'united' workers' movement. Only after the revolution did the split become unavoidable. There was a sharp polarization. The bourgeois dictatorship in Finland gave the extreme right wing of the old Social Democracy 'freedom' of organization and of the press for the express purpose of pacifying the workers. These traitors did their best to defeat the revolution the Finnish proletariat had made the previous year and to propagandize for a peaceful workers' movement functioning through parliament, trade unions, and cooperatives.... But the admonitions of those bourgeois lackeys are alien to the masses, who are tormented by prison, hunger, and poverty. The workers' memories of the White Terror are still fresh, and they can see the living example of the proletarian dictatorship in Russia.

Sirola also represented the Finnish party at the meetings of the Executive Committee of the Communist International (ECCI). While he was not a delegate to the 2nd World Congress of the Comintern in 1920, he did attend the 3rd World Congress in 1921 and in June 1922 took part in the 2nd Enlarged Plenum of ECCI. He worked as People's Commissar of Education in the Soviet Republic of Karelia, close to the Finnish border.

==== Return to America ====
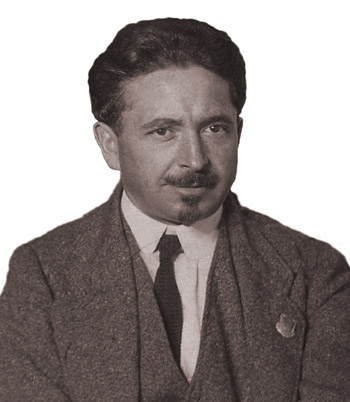
Max Bedacht (photo 1922), CPUSA co-founder, answered questions about Sirola during a 1939 Dies Committee hearing

Sirola was a representative of the Communist International to the US Communist Party from 1925 to 1927, replacing Sergey Ivanovich Gusev. While in America, Sirola used the pseudonym "Frank Miller."

In 1925 he was sent the United States as a representative of the Comintern to the Workers Party of America. On October 16, 1939, J.B. Matthews, chief investigator for the Dies Committee of the U.S. House of Representatives, inquired into activities of Gusev (transliterated as "Gussev" in the transcript) in the U.S. during the 1920s with Max Bedacht, a co-founder of the Communist Party of the USA and long-time general secretary of the International Workers Order (IWO):

Mr. Matthews: Do you know a man by the name of Sirola?
Mr. Bedacht: Sirola I also met in the Comintern, I believe.
Mr. Matthews: Did you ever meet him here?
Mr. Bedacht: I knew him by that name before I met him.
Mr. Matthews. Did you ever meet him the United States?
Mr. Bedacht: No, I did not.
Mr. Matthews: You did not know him as a Comintern representative in the United States?

Mr. Bedacht: No, I did not.

==== Karelia ====
In 1930, Sirola left his position as a functionary of the Comintern to become People's Commissar of Public Education in the Autonomous Soviet Socialist Republic of Karelia. Sirola also taught periodically in Leningrad at the Communist University of the National Minorities of the West in the department for Finns and Estonians and at the International Lenin School in Moscow.

Yrjö Sirola had begun researching Finnish folklore already in his youth. His longest article on the subject from the period was "Who were the heroes of the Kalevala?". Sirola continued researching the Kalevala in Soviet Karelia. On the initiative of Sirola, the Karelian Republic's Kantele Orchestra was formed. Sirola was also interested in Kalevala and folk poetry of other countries also from the perspective of Marxist historical materialism and wrote about the topic in articles "A Small Sample of Edda" and "A Sample of Russian Folklore" among others. Sirola made a speech at the 100th anniversary of the Kalevala in Petrozavodsk in 1935 and published a book Kalevala, the Cultural Heritage of Workers.

== Death ==
Yrjö Sirola died in Moscow of a stroke on March 18, 1936. He was 59 years old at the time of his death.

In 1957 Sirola's ashes were returned to Finland and reburied in Malmi cemetery in Helsinki.

== Legacy ==
A folk high school of the Finnish Communist Party, named the Sirola-opisto after him, existed in Vanajanlinna from 1946 to 1994.
