= Edvard Gylling =

Finnish politician (1881–1938)

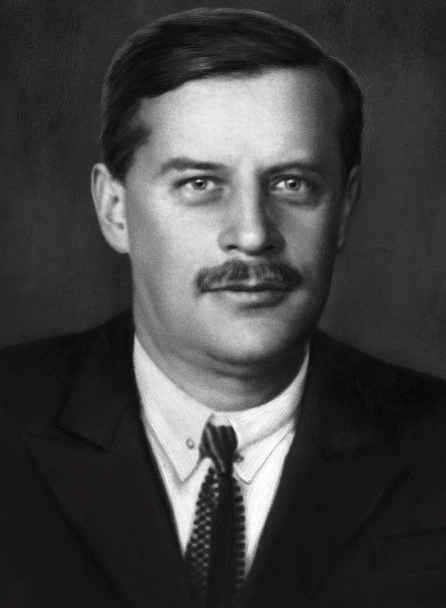

Chairman of the Council of People's Commissars of the Karelian Autonomous Soviet Socialist Republic
- In office October 1923 – November 1935
- Preceded by: Himself (as chairman of the executive committee of the Karelian Labor Commune)
- Succeeded by: Pavel Bushuyev

Personal details
- Born: 30 November 1881 Kuopio, Grand Duchy of Finland, Russian Empire
- Died: 14 June 1938 (aged 56) Kommunarka shooting ground, Moscow, Soviet Union
- Education: University of Helsinki
- Occupation: Politician; statistician
- Awards: Order of the Red Banner of Labour

Edvard Otto Vilhelm Gylling (30 November 1881 – 14 June 1938) was a Finnish politician, statistician and economist. A member of the Diet of Finland for the Social Democratic Party of Finland from 1908 to 1917 and vice chairman of the party, he served as Commissar of Finance for the revolutionary Red government during the Finnish Civil War. After the Red defeat he went into exile, eventually becoming the leader of Soviet Karelia as Chairman of the Council of its People's Commissars from 1923 to 1935, before falling victim to Stalin's purges.

== Early life and career ==
Gylling was born in Kuopio in 1881 into a middle-class family. He completed his doctorate at the Imperial Alexander University in Finland in 1909 with a thesis on the development of the crofter institution in Finland during the Swedish period, which established him as the Social Democratic Party's foremost expert on agrarian affairs. He had already become politically active in the early 1900s, speaking at party meetings, and in 1905 became editor-in-chief of the Marxist journal Sosialistinen aikakausilehti (Socialist Review); the editorial board also included Otto Wille Kuusinen, Sulo Wuolijoki and Yrjö Sirola.

Gylling was elected to the Diet of Finland for the Social Democrats in 1908, and his mandate was renewed in 1911 and 1917. He played a significant role in shaping the Social Democrats' Russia policy during the First World War and was elected vice chairman of the party. In November 1917 he co-authored with Otto Wille Kuusinen the declaration Vi kräver ("We demand"), presented by the Social Democrats to the Finnish parliament.

== Finnish Civil War ==
Gylling had until late 1917 been associated with the parliamentary wing of the Social Democrats, but after much hesitation joined the revolutionary faction in January 1918. When Finland split into Red and White sides and civil war broke out at the end of January 1918, Gylling took charge of economic affairs in the Red government as Commissar of Finance. He was one of the leaders of negotiations between Red Finland and the Russian Soviet government, which resulted in a joint treaty on 1 March 1918, signed in Saint Petersburg by Vladimir Lenin and Joseph Stalin from the Russian side and by Gylling and Oskari Tokoi from the Finnish side.

After the Red defeat, Gylling did not flee to Russia with most of the other People's Commissars. Instead, he went underground in Vyborg and then escaped to Sweden, where he headed the Stockholm bureau of the Communist Party of Finland, which had been founded in Moscow. In this capacity, he planned several military operations against the Finnish government, with the ultimate goal of establishing a Scandinavian Soviet republic encompassing Finland and Eastern Karelia. In May 1920, he travelled to Moscow at Lenin's invitation to report on the feasibility of creating an autonomous Karelian republic, assuring Lenin that autonomy would lead to increased economic and demographic development, and thereby encourage the locals to work towards "culture and the reinforcement of Soviet power".

== Soviet Karelia ==
The Soviet government offered Gylling a central role in leading the socialist labour commune established in Eastern Karelia in 1920. In 1923 the commune was transformed into the Karelian Autonomous Soviet Socialist Republic, and Gylling served as Chairman of its Council of People's Commissars – in effect the republic's prime minister – until 1935. In the same year, his left leg was amputated above the knee in Leningrad.

Karelia was intended to serve as a base for a future revolution in Finland. With Lenin's authorisation, Gylling implemented a Finnicisation policy despite Finns being a clear minority in the region. He recruited Finnish emigrants from North America and committed communists from Finland, though many who emigrated to Soviet Karelia in good faith faced severe hardship; thousands were arrested and placed in labour and prison camps, without any intervention on Gylling's part.

Following Lenin's death and Stalin's consolidation of power, Moscow's attitude towards the Finnicisation policy shifted sharply. Criticism of the Finnish leadership intensified in the early 1930s, and Gylling was accused of "nationalist chauvinism". He attempted to defend himself and submitted to the public self-criticism expected of him, but to no avail – even his old friend and former classmate Otto Wille Kuusinen turned his back on him. At the Karelian regional committee session in January 1935, Gylling was condemned. He was removed from his post as head of government of the Karelian Soviet Republic in October 1935, at the same time as his closest associate, Kustaa Rovio, was removed as secretary of the Bolshevik party's regional committee.

== Arrest and execution ==
After his removal, Gylling was directed to return to research in Moscow. In 17 July 1937 he was arrested, accused of counter-revolutionary conspiracies aimed at detaching Karelia from the Soviet Union and uniting it with Finland. In June 1938 he was sentenced to death in a show trial typical of the Stalin era; the formal pretext was misuse of production and food resources at a forestry collective in 1930. He was executed on 14 June 1938 at the Kommunarka shooting ground in Moscow. Many of his Finnish colleagues in Eastern Karelia, including Kustaa Rovio, were accused of complicity and shared his fate.

Soviet sources long maintained that Gylling had died during a deportation in the 1940s, but this has since been established to be false. Gylling was posthumously rehabilitated by the Soviet authorities in 1955.
