= Eino Rahja =

Finnish and Russian revolutionary (1885–1936)

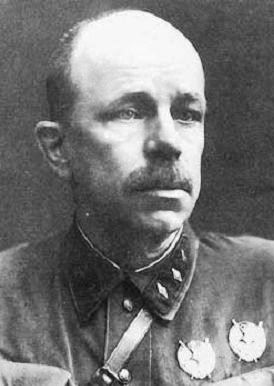
- Born: 20 June 1885; Kronstadt, Russian Empire
- Died: 26 April 1936 (aged 50) Leningrad, Russian SFSR, Soviet Union
- Allegiance: Red Finland; Soviet Union
- Service years: 1917–1931
- Rank: Commander
- Conflicts: Finnish Civil War; Battle of Tampere
- Awards: Order of the Red Banner

Eino Abramovich Rahja (20 June 1885 – 26 April 1936) was a Finnish and Russian revolutionary.

== Life ==
Born in Kronstadt, Russian Empire, Eino was a brother of Jukka Rahja and Jaakko Rahja. His brother, Jukka, was killed during the Kuusinen Club Incident on 31 August 1920. Their father was a Finnish dockworker, Aappo Rahja.

He joined the Russian Social Democratic Labour Party in 1903, becoming aligned with the party's Bolshevik faction. Rahja organized Lenin's temporary escape to Finland in the summer of 1917. During the Finnish Civil War, Rahja was one of the most capable military leaders of the Reds. After the Reds lost the war, he fled to the Russian SFSR where he lived for the rest of his life and became, for example, a commander of the army corps (komkor) in the Red Army.

Eino Rahja was expelled from the Central Committee of the Communist Party of Finland in 1927. In the early 1920s he was politically close to Grigory Zinoviev.

Rahja was expelled from the army in 1935 for his alcoholism and later sentenced to death in 1936, however, he died in April 1936 from tuberculosis and alcohol abuse, before he could be executed.

== See also ==
- Finland Station
