= Finnish Socialist Workers' Republic =

Socialist revolutionary faction of the Finnish Civil War (1918)

Finnish Socialist Workers' Republic: Suomen sosialistinen työväentasavalta (Finnish); Finlands socialistiska arbetarrepublik (Swedish)
- 1918
- Seal

- Red: Red Finland; Blue: White Finland (February 1918)
- Capital: Helsinki
- Common languages: Finnish, Swedish
- Government: Socialist republic
- Chairman
  - 1918: Kullervo Manner
- Council Chairman
  - 1918: Valfrid Perttilä
- Legislature: Central Workers' Council
- Historical era: World War I
  - Battle of Kämärä: 27 January 1918
  - FPD rule: 29 January 1918
  - Fall of Helsinki: 12 – 13 April 1918
  - Defeat: 5 May 1918
- Currency: Markka
Preceded by	Succeeded by
Republic of Finland	Kingdom of Finland
- Today part of: Finland; Russia

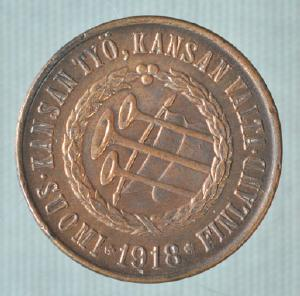
Backside of the Red Finland 5 penny coin with the motto "People's Work, People's Power"

The Finnish Socialist Workers' Republic (FSWR), more commonly referred to as Red Finland, was a self-proclaimed socialist state in Finland during the Finnish Civil War from January to May 1918.

The FSWR was established by the Finnish People's Delegation, a government formed by members of the Social Democratic Party to rival the existing Government of Finland, with support of the Red Guards. The FSWR controlled the capital Helsinki and most of southern Finland until March. Kullervo Manner served as its sole leader as Chairman of the Central Committee of the Finnish People's Delegation. The FSWR collapsed when the Red Guards were defeated by the White Finns and Germany, with Manner and most of the Finnish People's Delegation fleeing to Soviet Russia.

The name "Finnish Socialist Workers' Republic" (Finnish: Suomen sosialistinen työväentasavalta) appeared only in the Treaty between Finnish People's Delegation and Russian Council of People's Commissars, signed on 1 March 1918. The People's Delegation had earlier used the name Republic of Finland (Suomen tasavalta), but Soviet leader Vladimir Lenin proposed adding "Socialist Workers' Republic" into the name during negotiations. The People's Delegation later blamed its delegates for succumbing to Lenin's demand, since the official name of the state should have been decided by the Finns themselves.

== Aims ==
Red Finland/FSWR was an attempt to establish a socialist state, based on the legacy of Scandinavian-Finnish culture, socialist ideas originating from Central Europe, including plans to expand the Finnish territory. Their political visions included principles of democracy, but as Red Finland was primarily the formation of revolution and civil war, the acts of violence, including political terror were emphasized in the policy. The Red Guards included a minor faction of Finnish Bolsheviks who supported association of FSWR to Soviet Russia. FSWR/Red Finland never gained a true status and form of state and republic as the Reds lost the Civil War on 5 May 1918.

== Geographical area ==
The geographical area of Red Finland as well as the front line between White and Red Finland took shape approximately between 28 January and 3 February 1918, and it remained largely unchanged until the general offensive of the Whites in March 1918.

== Draft constitution ==
The Finnish People's Delegation, mainly Otto Kuusinen, formulated and set forth on 23 February 1918 a draft for a constitution of Red Finland/FSWR, on the basis of Finnish Social Democratic principles and mentality. The Marxist concept of a dictatorship of the proletariat was absent from the program. Instead, it represented an idea of democratic socialism and it was influenced by the French Revolution and the constitutions of Switzerland and the United States. The constitution model included most democratic civil rights for Finnish citizens, including an extensive use of referendums in political decision-making, but private property rights were excluded and given to state and local administration. The draft was never finally formulated and approved in Red Finland before the defeat of the FSWR in the 1918 war.

The political situation after the "January Revolution" in Finland raised a major question in terms of the constitution draft, among the Finnish moderate socialists. The question arose if the power gained via revolution would allow democracy a true chance in Finnish society. The relation between democracy and revolution was contradictory for the socialists, as the February Revolution empowered the lamed Finnish Parliament, until July 1917; restoration of the socialists' power in the Parliament was among the main goals of the January Revolution in 1918. The Finnish Red-White conflict of 1918 has been described as Class War, Rebellion, (Red) Revolt and Abortive (Red) Revolution by the Finnish Red veterans.

== Relations with Lenin ==
Although the Finnish Socialist Worker's Republic was supported by the Russian Soviet Federative Socialist Republic (RSFSR), led by Vladimir Lenin, and the 1 March 1918 Red Treaty was signed between these two unstable socialist states, an ideal level of co-operation and co-ordination was never achieved, due to both states being preoccupied with their own respective civil wars. The goal of the Finnish Reds' majority was a neutral and independent Finland, and some of them demanded annexation of Aunus, Viena Karelia and Petsamo areas of Russian Karelia to Finland. The Russian-Finnish Red treaty had only minor importance for the Bolsheviks as they carried out peace negotiations with the German Empire. In the end, the fate of the Finnish Reds and FSWR was determined through the power political decisions made between Russia and Germany. Edvard Gylling was the prime mover at the start of the Finnish-Russian talks for the Red Treaty; among other things he aimed to work for peace talks between the Finnish Whites and Reds, by diminishing the Russian influence in Finland. The Finnish Bolsheviks, few in number, but influential and active in the Finnish Red Guards supported Lenin's Russian federalism. The Finns got Petsamo, but the question of Aunus and Viena remained open.

Lenin aimed to halt a complete collapse of Russia after the revolutionary year 1917. While in political opposition prior to the October Revolution, Lenin emphasized the policy of nations' right to self-determination for the former parts of the Russian Empire. After the successful seizure of power in October 1917 and in January 1918, the Bolsheviks' power political strategy shifted gradually toward federalism. As for Finland, Lenin plotted its annexation by Russia, but the Russian Civil War, German-Russian Treaty of Brest-Litovsk, Finland-operation of the German Army, the victory of the White Guards in the Finnish civil war and the marked nationalism among the Finnish socialists stalled his plan.

== Finnish Civil War ==
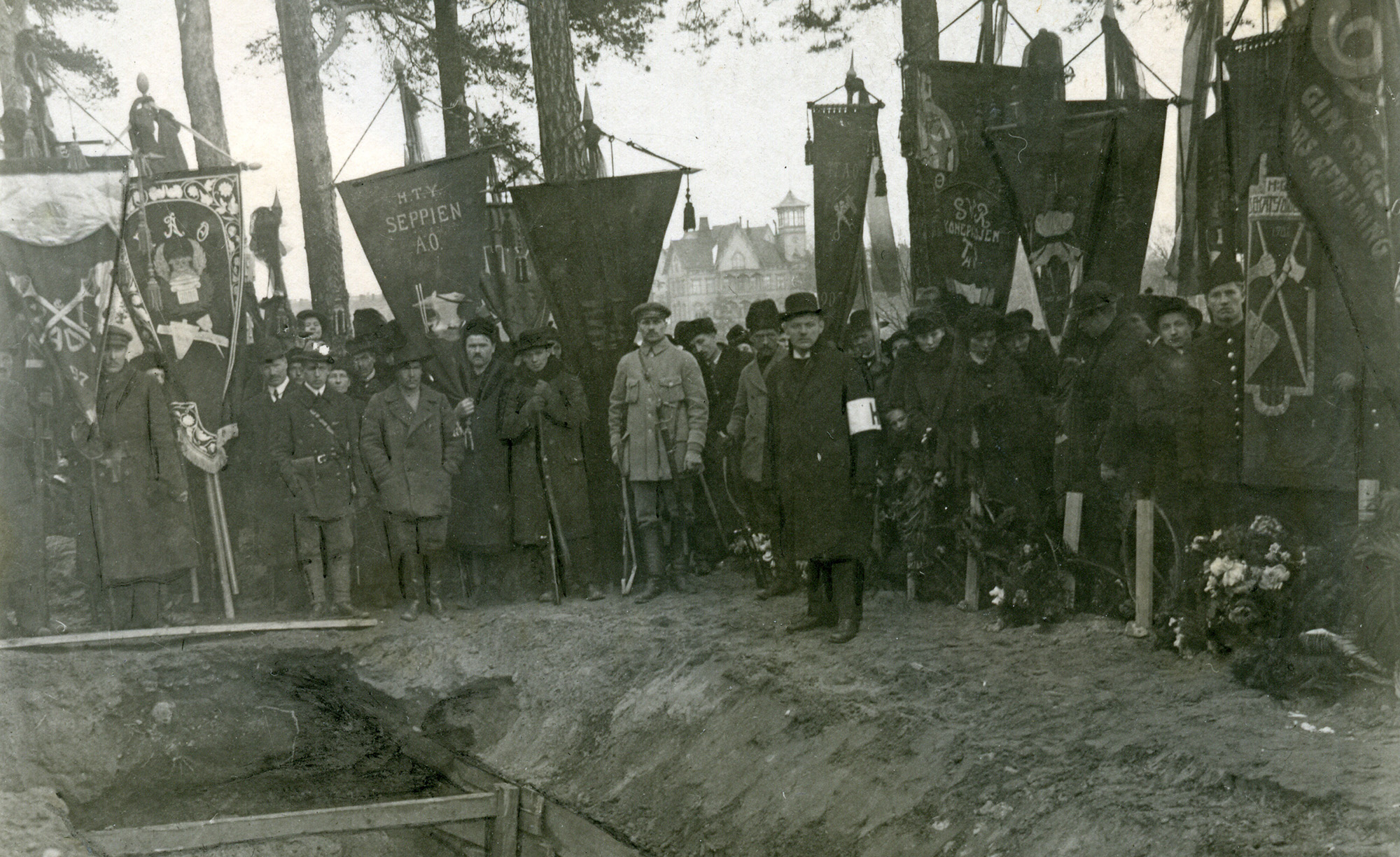
Funeral of the fallen Red Guard fighters in Helsinki

After the start of the Finnish Civil War, on January 28, 1918, Kullervo Manner was appointed chairman of the People's Delegation, the Red Government. On April 10 of the same year, the Reds reformed their entire administration and Manner was appointed leader of the Red Finland and the Supreme Commander of the Red Guard under the authority of the dictator.

The warfare between the Reds and Whites took major attention and energy of the Red leadership, and the situation was not alleviated by the loss of many strategically important sites, such as Tampere, to the Whites. Therefore, the formation of the local Red civil administration remained unfinished and waited for the result of the Civil War. The top and middle-rank civil servants of the pre-civil war administration refused to co-operate with the Reds, and new leadership had to be chosen and trained from the lower rank servants.

=== Battle of Tampere (March–April 1918) ===
The Battle of Tampere was the largest and most decisive urban battle of the Finnish Civil War. Fought between White Army forces and the Red Guards, it unfolded from late March to early April 1918. Tampere was the strongest Red-held city in southern Finland, serving as a major industrial center, supply hub, and key strategic position. The White Army, under General Carl Gustaf Emil Mannerheim, surrounded the city and launched a fierce assault that turned into intense street-to-street and house-to-house fighting—the most brutal combat of the entire war. The Reds resisted heavily but were outmatched by the Whites’ better-trained troops and artillery superiority. After days of combat, the Whites captured the city on 6 April 1918, dealing a devastating blow to the Red military leadership and morale. Thousands of Red fighters were killed, wounded, or captured. The fall of Tampere marked the beginning of the collapse of Red Finland and shifted the momentum decisively in favor of the Whites.

=== Battle of Viipuri (April 1918) ===
The Battle of Viipuri was one of the final major engagements of the Finnish Civil War, fought in April 1918 between the White Army and the Red Guards. After the fall of Tampere, the Whites advanced eastward and encircled Viipuri (Vyborg), the last major city still under Red control and a crucial gateway to Russia. The battle involved heavy fighting as the Whites stormed the city from multiple directions, while the Reds attempted a desperate defense to keep open escape routes toward the Russian border. Despite their efforts, the Red forces were overwhelmed by the Whites’ superior organization and reinforcements. The Whites captured Viipuri on 29 April 1918, effectively ending organized Red resistance in southeastern Finland. The fall of the city closed the last major corridor to Soviet Russia, trapping many remaining Red fighters and civilian supporters. With Viipuri lost, the Finnish Socialist Workers’ Republic collapsed shortly afterward.

=== Battle of Helsinki (April 1918) ===
The Battle of Helsinki took place in early April 1918, when German Baltic Sea Division troops, allied with the Finnish White Army, launched a rapid offensive to capture the capital from the Red Guards. The Germans landed at Hanko and Loviisa, advanced quickly toward Helsinki, and began their assault on the city on 12 April. The Reds, already weakened by earlier defeats, mounted only limited resistance. The battle was relatively short, with fighting concentrated in key streets and government districts. By 13 April 1918, German forces had secured the city, and the Red administration fled or was arrested. The fall of Helsinki delivered a major political and symbolic victory to the Whites, restoring the capital to their control and accelerating the collapse of Red Finland.

=== Defeat and political collapse ===
The Finnish Civil War ended with the German invasion of Finland and the consequent defeat of the Finnish Red Guards and the FSWR on 5 May 1918. After the war, the initially powerful and well-organized Finnish Social Democrats, who had formed in the relatively free and nationalistic social atmosphere of Scandinavian and Russian culture and drew on the socialist ideas of Germany and pre-World War I Austria-Hungary, were split into two. The moderate socialists continued their pre-1918 political culture, joining the social and political system of republican Finland. The far-left faction formed the Communist Party of Finland in August 1918 in Moscow, with its main leaders living in exile in Russia and many of its supporters living in Finland.

== Politics ==
=== Government ===
The Finnish Socialist Workers' Republic—commonly called Red Finland—was a short-lived socialist state established by the Finnish Social Democratic Party during the Finnish Civil War in early 1918. Its government was the People's Delegation, which acted as both the executive and administrative authority in the Red-controlled areas of southern Finland. The state was modeled partly on the Russian Bolshevik system and relied heavily on cooperation with Soviet Russia for military and political support. Red Finland aimed to create a socialist workers' democracy, reform land ownership, and shift power from elites to workers' councils. However, it lacked military strength, international recognition, and stable territory. The government collapsed in April–May 1918 when the White Finnish forces defeated the Red Guards.

=== Cabinet ===
The cabinet functioned as a revolutionary socialist government, attempting to introduce extensive social reforms such as land redistribution, expanded workers' rights, and a more democratic administrative order. Modeled partly on the Russian Bolshevik example but still rooted in parliamentary socialism, the Delegation took responsibility for civil administration, justice, education, supply management, and the war effort. Its effectiveness was limited by wartime disruption, administrative inexperience, and military pressure from White forces. The cabinet collapsed after the Red military defeat in April–May 1918.

- Kullervo Manner – Chairman (Head of Government)
- Edvard Gylling – Commissioner for Finance
- Otto Wille Kuusinen – Commissioner for Education
- Yrjö Mäkelin – Commissioner for Internal Affairs
- Eero Haapalainen – Commissioner for War
- Johan Helo – Commissioner for Justice
- Oskar Rantala – Commissioner for Agriculture
- Antti Kiviranta – Commissioner for Transport
- Johan Kokkinen – Commissioner for Supply
- Antti Nevalainen – Commissioner for Labour

=== Military ===
The military of the Finnish Socialist Workers' Republic was centered around the Red Guards, a workers' militia formed from labor organizations, trade unions, and socialist youth groups. Unlike the White Army, the Red forces were not a professional national army but a revolutionary volunteer force whose organization reflected the political ideals of the workers' movement. Command structures were democratic and often elected, which boosted morale but created serious problems with discipline and strategic coordination. The Red Guards controlled southern Finland at the beginning of the civil war, especially industrial cities like Helsinki and Tampere. They had tens of thousands of fighters but suffered from major disadvantages such a lack of trained officers, as most professionals joined the White side Insufficient arms, equipment, and ammunition Weak central command and inconsistent training Dependence on Soviet Russia, which offered limited and unreliable support due to its own turmoil The Red military attempted to form more organized units, including artillery and supply services, but these efforts were hampered by internal disagreements and wartime chaos. Although the Red Guards won some early victories, they gradually lost ground as the White Army, reinforced by well-trained German troops, advanced north-to-south through Finland. Crushing defeats at Tampere and other key cities broke their cohesion. By April–May 1918, the Red military collapsed, leading to the fall of the Finnish Socialist Workers' Republic. Survivors either fled to Soviet Russia or were captured by White forces.

=== Chairman of the People's Delegation ===
The Chairman of the People's Delegation was Kullervo Manner, the political leader of Red Finland during the Finnish Civil War of 1918. As chairman of the People's Delegation—the revolutionary government—Manner acted as the head of state and head of government for the Red-controlled areas. He oversaw central administration, coordinated policy with Soviet Russia, and directed the overall political and military strategy of the socialist republic. Manner was a prominent Social Democrat and one of the most influential figures in Finland's left-wing movement. His role involved unifying the various socialist factions, managing the war effort alongside the Red Guard leadership, and implementing the government's reform agenda under difficult wartime conditions. Despite his authority, the administration struggled with shortages, limited resources, and growing military setbacks. After the collapse of Red Finland in April–May 1918, Manner fled to Soviet Russia, where he continued to participate in the Finnish communist movement until his death.

=== Use of local worker councils ===
The Finnish Socialist Workers' Republic relied heavily on local worker councils (työväenneuvostot) as the grassroots governing bodies of the Red-controlled areas. These councils, formed by workers, trade union members, and local socialist leaders, acted as the main instruments of local administration, replacing the traditional municipal authorities that had aligned with the White government. The worker councils were responsible for maintaining order, supervising and supporting local Red Guard detachments, overseeing food distribution and rationing during shortages, managing workplaces such as factories, transport, and public services, implementing economic and social reforms, including workplace democracy, and coordinating with the People's Delegation (the national government) to carry out policies. In theory, the councils formed the foundation of a bottom-up socialist democracy, giving workers direct influence over political and economic life. In practice, their effectiveness varied widely due to differences in local leadership, wartime disruption, and shortages of administrative expertise. Some councils operated efficiently, while others struggled with conflict, inexperience, and limited resources. Despite these challenges, worker councils were essential to the functioning of Red Finland, allowing the revolutionary government to exert control across its territory and embodying its goal of giving political power to ordinary workers. Their role ended with the collapse of the Red administration in April–May 1918.

== See also ==
- List of states and regions involved in the Russian Civil War
- Bibliography of the Russian Revolution and Civil War
- Outline of the Russian Revolution and Civil War
- Eero Haapalainen
- Republic of Finland
- Finnish Democratic Republic — short-lived Soviet puppet government during World War II
- Karelo-Finnish Soviet Socialist Republic
- Kingdom of Finland (1918)
- Kullervo Manner
- Otto Kuusinen
- Revolutions of 1917–1923
- Santeri Nuorteva
