= Battle of Tampere =

1918 battle of the Finnish Civil War

Coordinates: 61.498011°N 23.763686°E

- Part of the Finnish Civil War
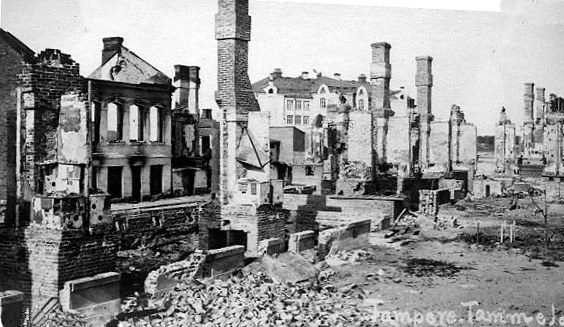
- The Tammela neighborhood after the battle
Date	15 March – 6 April 1918 (3 weeks and 1 day)
Location	Tampere, Finland
Result	Finnish White victory

Belligerents
Finnish Whites; Swedish Brigade	Finnish Reds

Commanders and leaders
C. G. E. Mannerheim; Hjalmar Frisell	Hugo Salmela †; Georgy Bulatsel (executed); Ali Aaltonen; Verner Lehtimäki

Strength
16,000; 400 Swedish volunteers	14,000

Casualties and losses
820 killed	2,000 killed or executed 10,000–11,000 captured

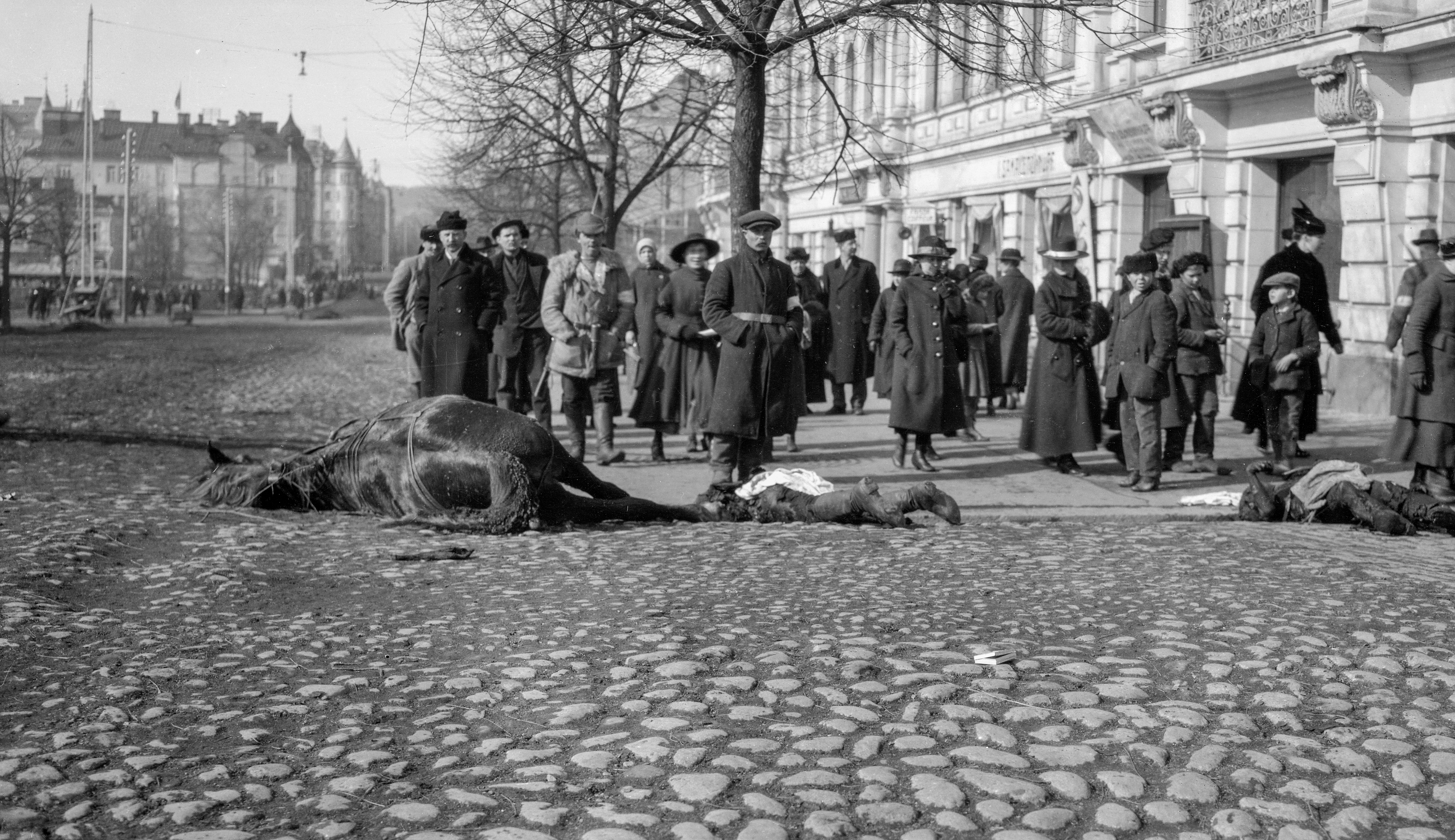
Fallen Red Guard fighters

The Battle of Tampere was a 1918 Finnish Civil War battle, fought in Tampere, Finland from 15 March to 6 April between the Whites and the Reds. It is the most famous and deadly of all the Finnish Civil War battles. Its bloody aftermath saw the Whites execute hundreds of captured Reds with another 11,000 prisoners sent to the Kalevankangas camp.

== Background ==
In the 1910s, Tampere was the third largest town in Finland with a population of approximately 60,000, including the suburbs. It was the most industrialized town in Finland and was considered the capital of the Finnish labour movement. Tampere had played a key role in the 1905 general strike and was a stronghold for the trade unions and the Social Democratic Party.

As the Civil War started in late January 1918, the Reds targeted the important railway junction of Haapamäki, 100 kilometres north of Tampere. The frontline was soon established 50–60 kilometres north of Tampere and the Tavastia Front became the major theatre of the war. The large working-class population and the railway connections made Tampere the main base for Red Guards, although the Red government was working in Helsinki. On January 27, Tampere was completely under the control of the Reds. Tampere Red Guard had about 6,000 members, including 300 women, about 5% of the total.

== Siege of Tampere ==
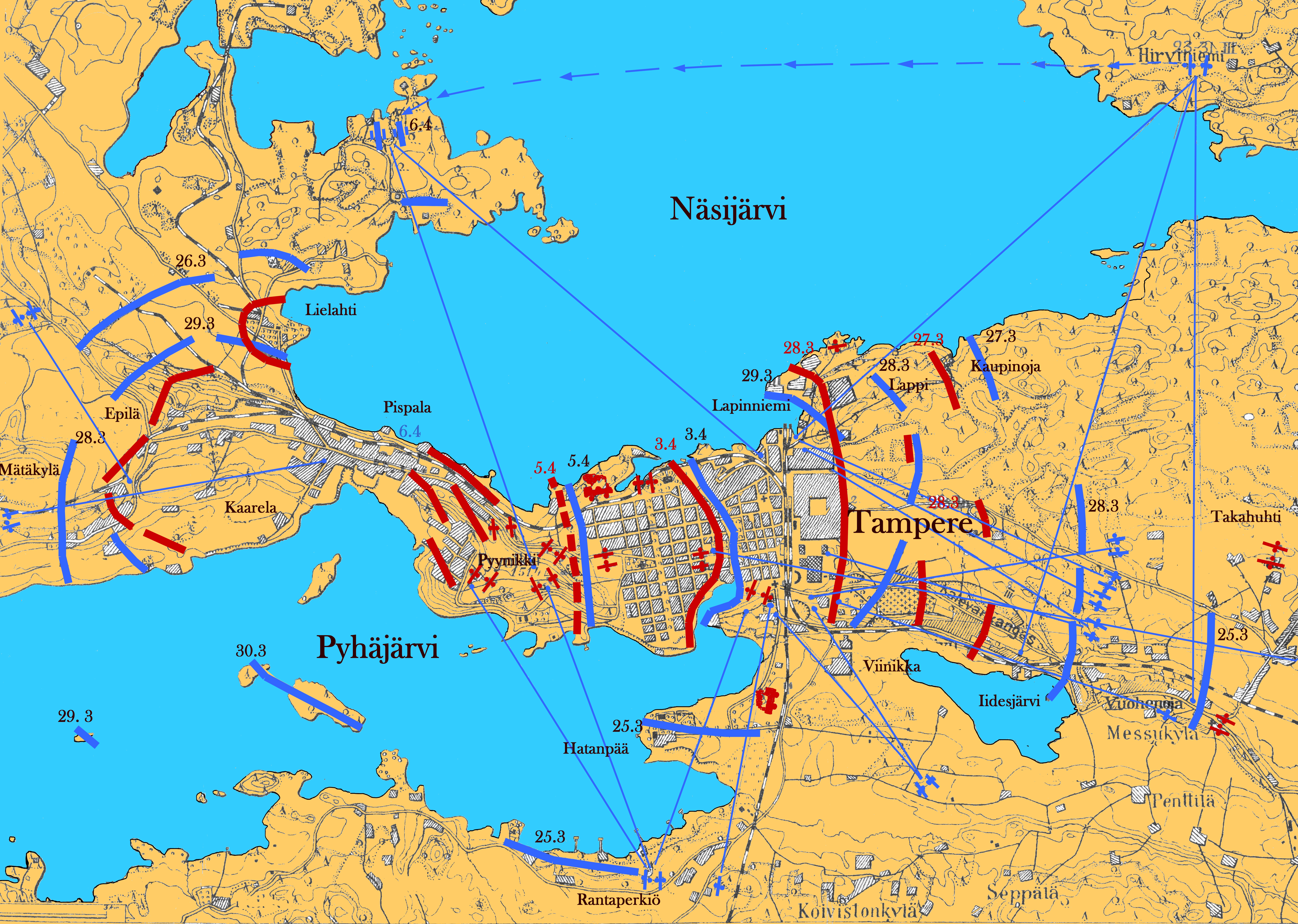
General map of the battle of Tampere, the presentation includes shooting targets of the White artillery.

As the Red offensives failed in late February and early March, the Whites launched their operation against Tampere on 15 March. The aim was to encircle the Red forces on the Tavastia Front and then invade Tampere. Heavy fighting occurred in Jämsä, Orivesi, Ruovesi, and Vilppula. The fiercest were the Battle of Länkipohja in Jämsä on 16 March and the Battle of Orivesi two days later. The Red front collapsed and the troops withdrew towards Tampere where the Reds now had about 15,000 fighters. Instead of capitulating, the Red staff decided to defend the city as long as possible. The Whites reached Tampere on 23 March and besieged the city with 17,000 men in the largest military operation of the war. Related battles were fought in the areas of Ylöjärvi, Pirkkala, Messukylä, Aitolahti, Lempäälä, Vesilahti, and Tottijärvi, as well as further west on the Satakunta Front in Karkku and Hämeenkyrö.

On 23 March, the Whites approached Tampere from the northeast and clashed with the Red defence in Vehmainen, 10 kilometres east of the city. During the next two days, the Whites also attacked the suburb of Messukylä in the southeast (taking over for a moment the Takahuhti village belonging to it) and the village of Lempäälä, 15 kilometres south of Tampere, but were repelled. White artillery started firing on the town, and the Reds were forced to evacuate the eastern working-class district of Tammela. The Whites captured the village of Kangasala, 15 kilometres east of Tampere, but using an armoured train, 300 Reds managed to fight their way through advancing White troops and flee to Messukylä. On the evening of 24 March, the Reds finally lost Lempäälä. The Whites were now able to cut the Riihimäki–Tampere railway, the main Red supply line.

The Whites completed the siege on 26 March by taking the Siuro railway station on the Pori railway, 20 kilometres west of Tampere in the Siuro village. On the same day, the Reds left their defence posts in Messukylä, forming a new line next to the Kaleva district. The Whites also managed to capture Ylöjärvi, located 10 kilometres northwest of Tampere. After taking Ylöjärvi, the Whites instantly continued the attack on the western side of town in Epilä and south in Hatanpää, but suffered heavy losses and were pushed back. The Reds, in turn, launched a 3,500-man counterattack in Lempäälä, under the command of Eino Rahja. The Red Guards of Turku and Yläne attempted a simultaneous breakthrough along the southbound Helsinki railway. Up to 30 fighters were killed and the armoured train had to pull back. On 27 March, the fighting still continued in Messukylä–Kaleva area, Epilä and Lempäälä.

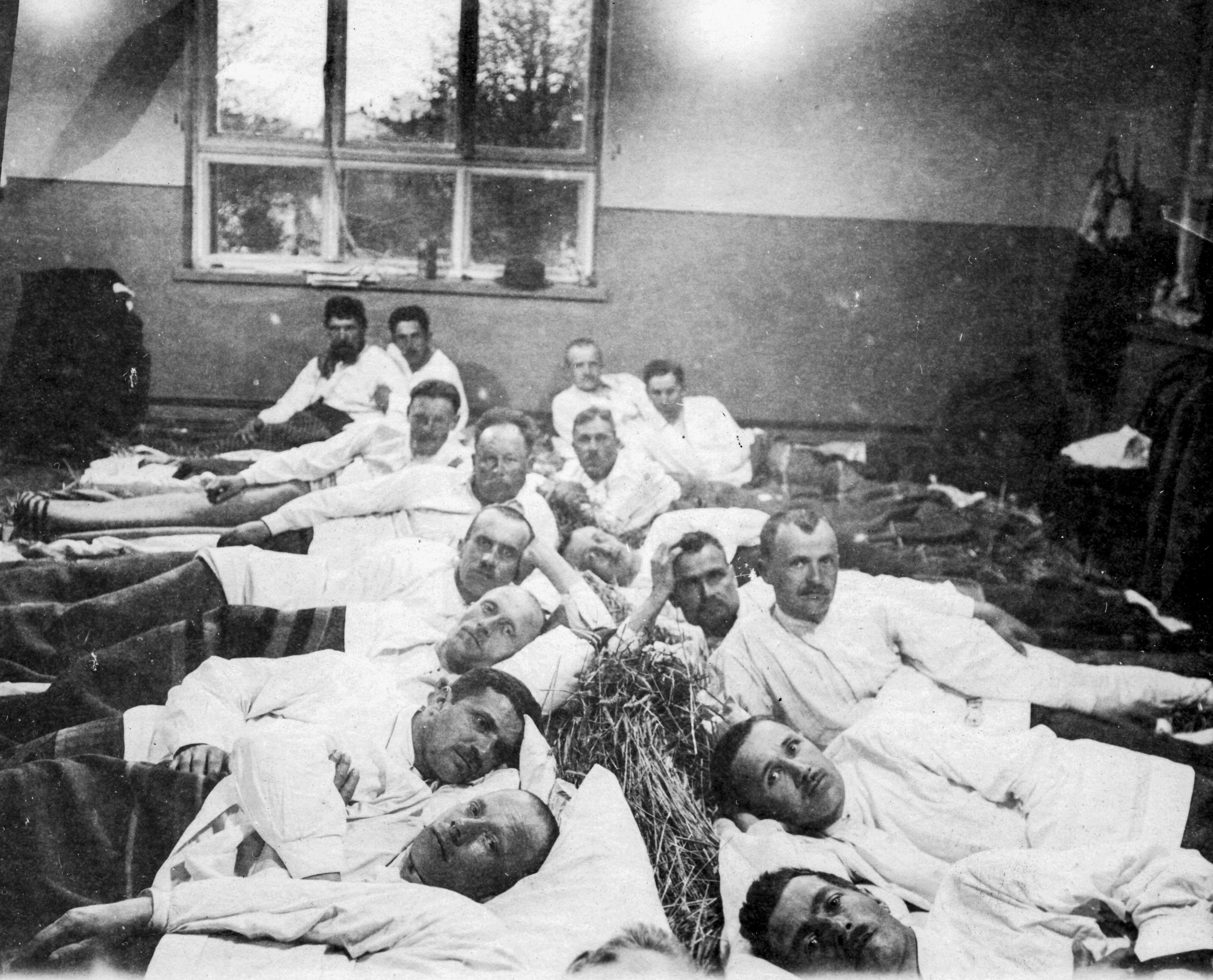
Wounded Red soldiers in a hospital

== Bloody Thursday ==
On 28 March, the Whites suffered the hardest daily casualties of the war so far, in what was later called ″Bloody Thursday″. The Whites completed a large offensive in order to finally enter the town. The fighting concentrated in the areas of Kalevankangas Cemetery and the Hippodrome in the eastern outskirts of Tampere. The attack was launched at 9:00 am. After seven hours of fighting, the Whites managed to repel the Reds from the Kaleva district but could not reach the town.

Instead of the paramilitary White Guards, the White Army now used troops composed of conscripts and led by Jäger officers. Conscripts were much easier to command and send into a heavy battle than voluntary White Guards. Instead of disobedience, the problem was now the lack of war experience which in turn meant heavy losses. Three White battalions had at least 200 men killed, the total casualties were more than 50% of their strength in dead or wounded. Also the voluntary Swedish Brigade and the German-trained Jäger troops suffered heavy losses. The Swedes were dressed in white snow-camouflage battledresses, making them an easy target as there was hardly any snow at all. The Jägers wore green uniforms which easily stood out among the grey-suited privates. As a result, the 400-man Swedish Brigade lost 20 and the Jäger troops lost 27 officers.

During the day, the Reds had 50–70 fighters killed. The Red leader Hugo Salmela died after a hand grenade accidentally exploded in his headquarters. He was succeeded by Verner Lehtimäki. According to the French journalist Henry Laporte, Lehtimäki drove in his car back and forth through the Red lines to encourage his men. Laporte was a retired officer returning from an official mission to Russia. He later described his experiences of the Tampere Battle in the 1929 book Le Premier Échec des Rouges.

After the failed attack, the Whites halted their offensive for the next five days. Only the artillery was pounding the town. The artillery fire killed at least 20 civilians, some of them neutral or White supporters, and destroyed the working-class neighbourhoods of Tammela and Kyttälä almost completely. During this five-day period, the fighting continued in Lempäälä, where the Reds still were desperately trying to break through.

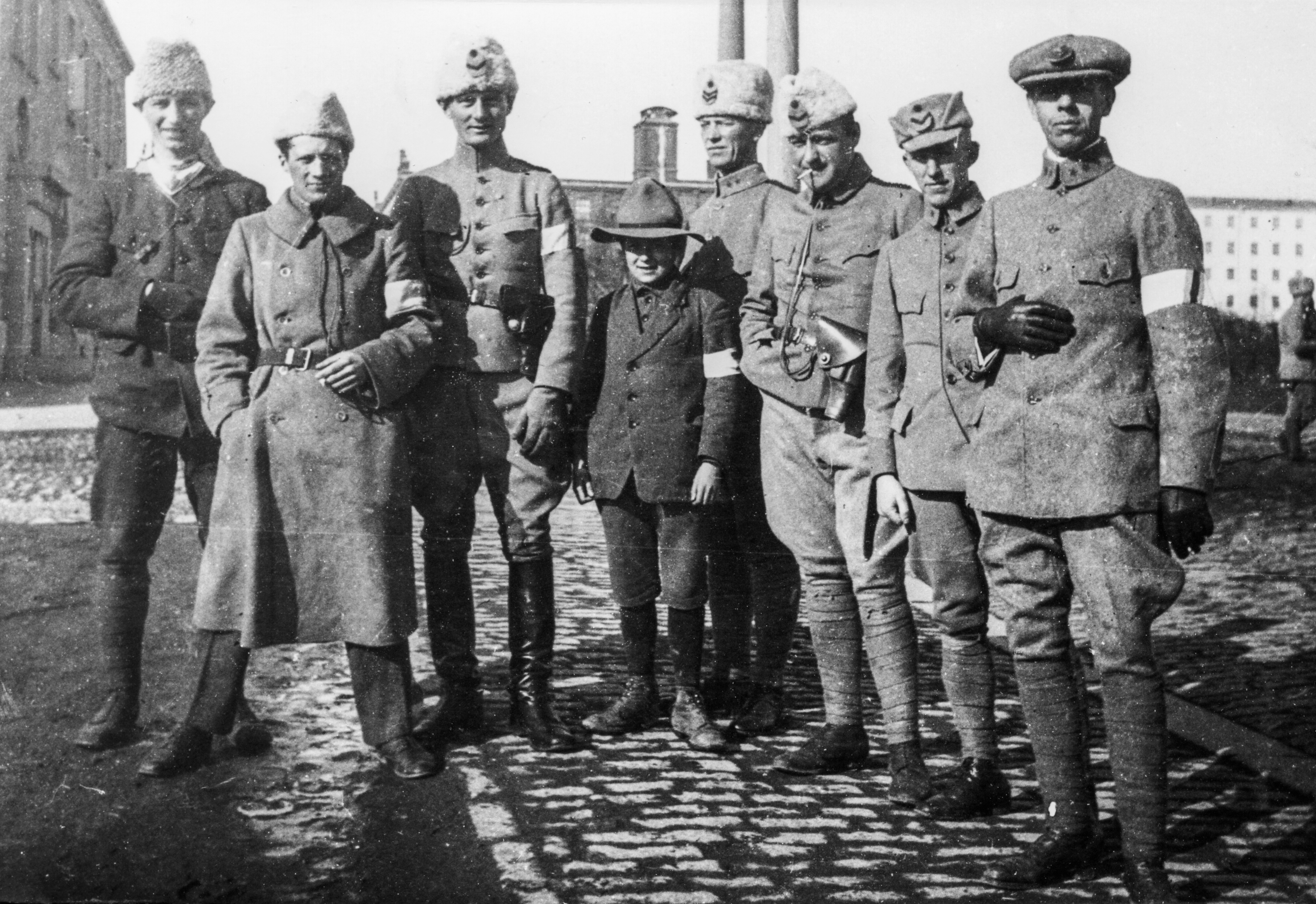
Swedish volunteers

== Battle in the town ==
The Whites launched their decisive offensive on 3 April at 2:30 am. During the first day, they managed to take the eastern working-class districts of Tammela and Kyttälä despite the heavy resistance. The fighting went on block by block and house by house. The Whites finally reached the Tammerkoski river which divided the town in two. During the day, the Whites had 207 killed and the Reds 115–170. Also, nearly 20 civilians were killed. As leaving the town was impossible, people from the suburbs fled into the centre. Churches and other public buildings were crowded with refugees, the local residents hid in their basements. 1,700 people took shelter in the Tampere Cathedral.

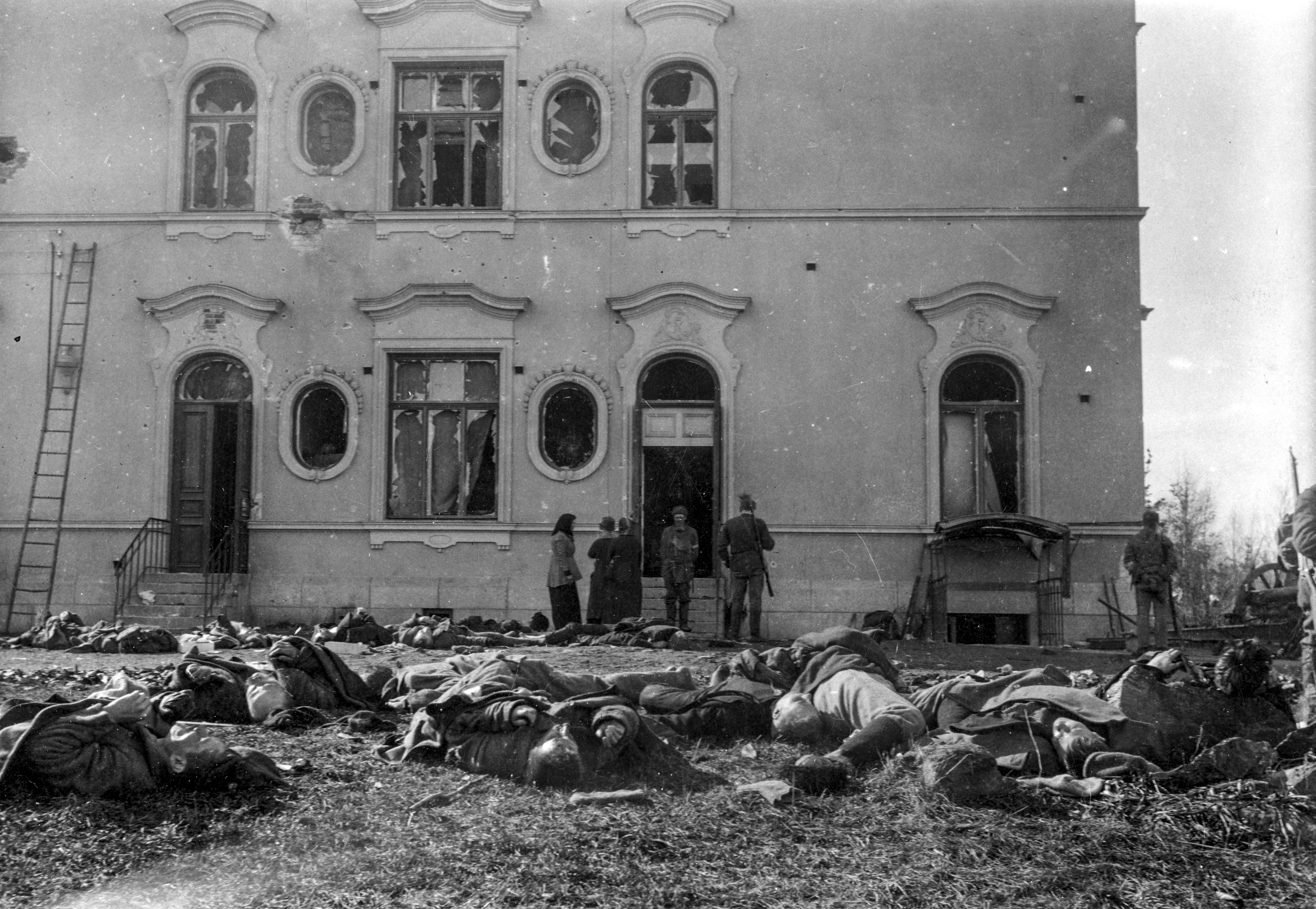
Dead Reds by the Näsilinna Palace

One of the most famous operations of the battle was conducted on the same day. A company-sized White unit led by jäger Gunnar Melin took the Näsilinna Palace on the Näsinkallio hill after breaking through the Reds' lines, only to lose it again in the evening, as the main force was stuck on the east side of Tammerkoski. Melin's troops executed 20 surrendered Reds in the yard of the Näsinlinna Palace despite the leaflets signed by the White commander C. G. E. Mannerheim claiming Whites would not shoot prisoners.

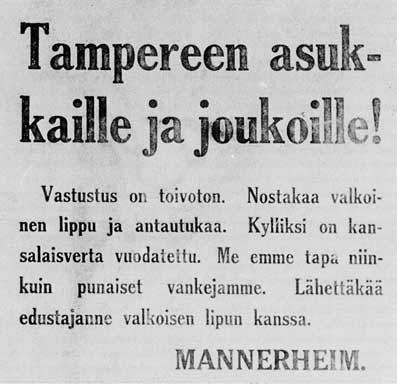
A propaganda leaflet signed by General Mannerheim circulated by the Whites urging the Red defenders to surrender. English: To the residents and troops of Tampere! Resistance is hopeless. Raise the white flag and surrender. The blood of the citizen has been shed enough. We will not kill like the Reds kill their prisoners. Send your representative with a white flag.

On the next morning at 4:00 am, the Whites crossed the Tammerkoski River at several points, including the railway bridge and the Satakunnansilta and Hämeensilta bridges. In the evening, they reached Hämeenpuisto Avenue on the western side of town. On 5 April, the Whites managed to take the rest of the town. The last Red pocket was the City Hall, defended together by male and female fighters. According to a legend, the City Hall lasted this long as the Tampere Women's Red Guard refused to capitulate. The last City Hall defenders finally surrendered at 5:30 pm. The remaining Reds retreated to the western suburbs of Pyynikki and Pispala. In the evening, a large group of Reds managed to flee across the ice of lakes Pyhäjärvi and Näsijärvi. Among them were Red leaders Verner Lehtimäki, Ali Aaltonen and K. M. Evä.

On 6 April, the Whites were about to attack the western suburbs, but at 8:30 am a white flag was raised on top of the Pyynikki Tower, and the battle was over. However, there were still some lone Red snipers for a couple of days.

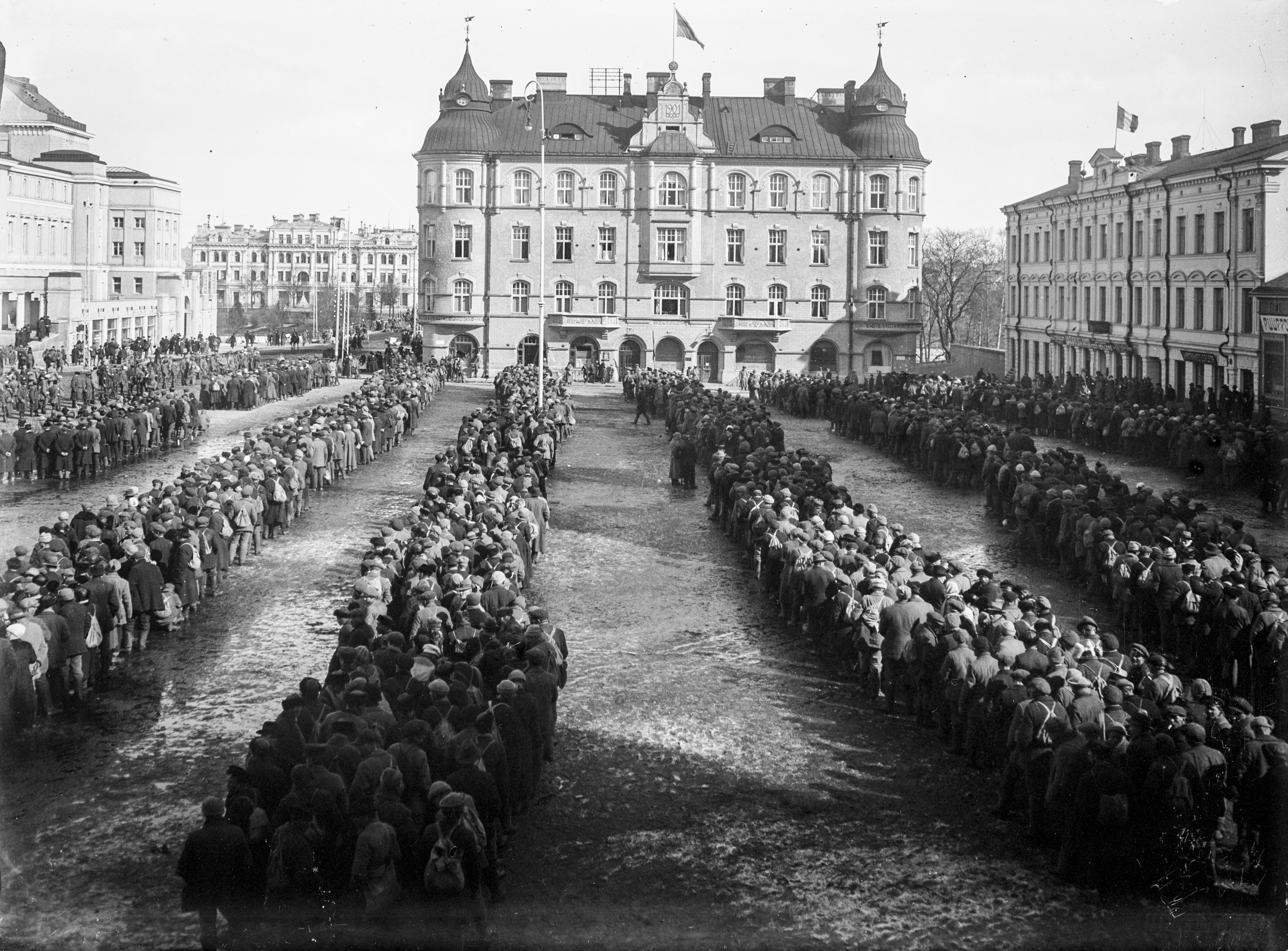
Captured Reds in the Central Square

== Casualties ==
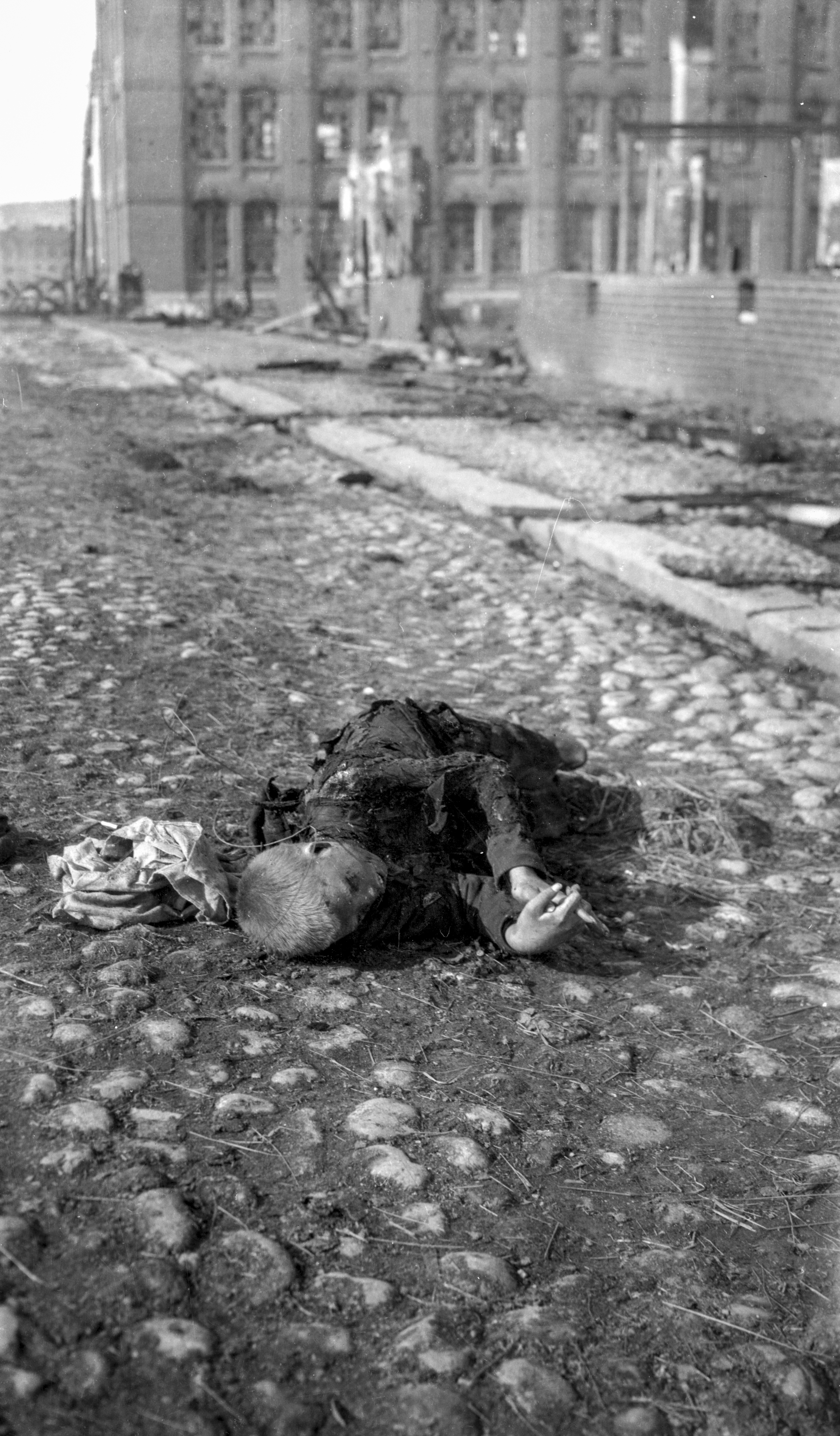
The body of a young boy on Suvantokatu near the intersection of Aleksanterinkatu after battle.

The true number of casualties is unclear. The number of killed Whites is usually estimated at 600–820 and the Reds at 600–1,000. A thousand Reds and 200 Russians were also executed after the battle. According to some sources, a mass grave in the Kalevankangas Cemetery contains 2,751 Reds of which 1,208 were killed in action. The War Victims of Finland 1914–1922 database knows the names of 824 Whites, 1,087 Reds and 67 are unknown or neutral.

Notable persons who died in the Battle of Tampere were the Swedish historian Olof Palme, Members of the Parliament Ernst Saari and Juho Lehmus, editor and translator Matti Kivekäs, the poet Juhani Siljo, the Russian officer Georgij Bulatsel and the Olympic athletes David Kolehmainen and Kalle Viljamaa.

== Aftermath ==
The Whites started the executions right after the Reds surrendered. Up to 1,000 were shot as well as all the Russians in Tampere. Most of the 200 executed Russians were soldiers. The executed included also women and children, although captured women fighters were not systematically shot like the Whites did in Lahti and Vyborg. Even people who were neither involved in the battle nor members of the Red Guards were imprisoned and killed.

As the number of capitulated became too large, it was impossible to shoot everyone. More than 10,000 Reds were gathered to the Central Square, where they had to stand for nearly 24 hours. The prisoners were then transferred to a prison camp established in the eastern Kaleva district. During the next five months, 1,228 Reds died in the Tampere camp of executions, disease or hunger.

== Memorials ==
The statue of the White Army commander C. G. E. Mannerheim stands at the site where he was observing the battle. The controversial statue was first suggested to the Koskipuisto park in 1939 but was finally erected on a hill eight kilometres from Tampere in 1956. Due to its remote location, the statue has often been vandalized during the years by local anarchists and other left-wing radicals. Vapaudenpatsas (The Statue of Liberty), by the sculptor Viktor Jansson, is another statue commemorating the White conquest of Tampere. It was placed in the Hämeenpuisto Park in 1921. The model of the figure was the far-right priest Elias Simojoki. The statue is holding a sword pointed towards the Tampere Workers' Hall on the other side of the park. The statue is often called Rummin-Jussi, after the nickname of the infamous White executioner Johannes From, who was responsible for executing more than 70 Reds. The Swedish Brigade commemorative plaque is placed near the Kalevankangas Cemetery. It is a work of the sculptor Gunnar Finne.

The Red memorial was erected to the Kalevankangas Cemetery in 1941. It was designed by the sculptor Jussi Hietanen who was held at the Kalevankangas Prison Camp in 1918 at the age of 15. Another memorial is placed in Pispala where the last Reds surrendered.

== See also ==
- Battle of Helsinki
- Battle of Lahti
- Battle of Vyborg
