= Ali Aaltonen =

Finnish socialist leader, journalist, and lieutenant (1884–1918)

- Aleksi Aaltonen
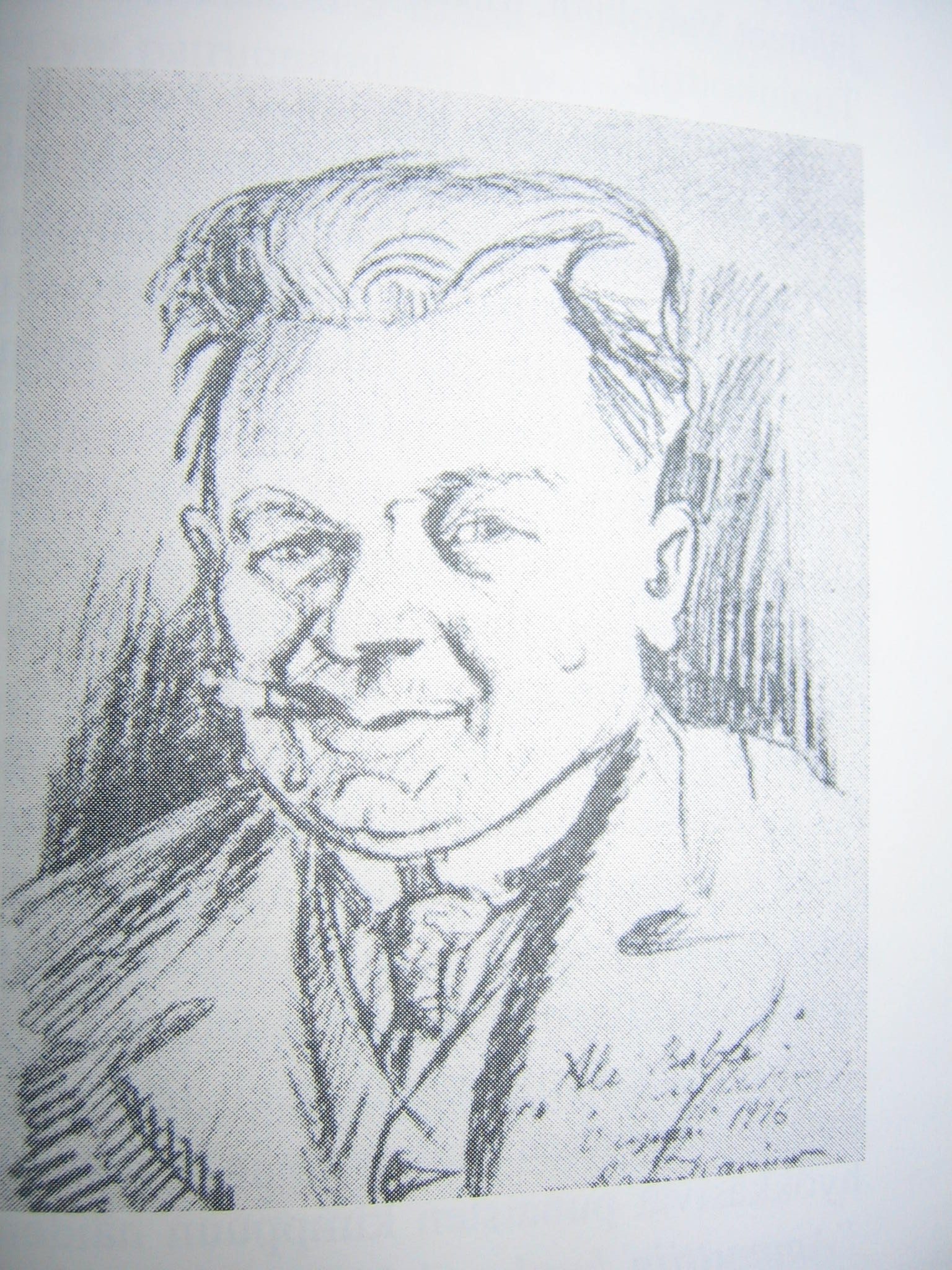
- A 1916 sketch of Ali Aaltonen
- Born: 2 August 1884; Jämsä, Grand Duchy of Finland, Russian Empire
- Died: May 1918 (aged 33); Lahti, Finland
- Military career
- Allegiance: Russia; Socialist Finland
- Service years: 1903–1905, 1917–1918
- Rank: Lieutenant
- Conflicts: Russo-Japanese War; Finnish Civil War

Aleksi "Ali" Aaltonen (2 August 1884 – May 1918) was a Finnish journalist and former lieutenant of the Russian Imperial Army, who served as the first commander-in-chief of the Finnish Red Guards from November 1917 to the end of January 1918. He was executed in Lahti after the Finnish Civil War in May 1918.

== Life ==
=== Early years ===
Aaltonen was born to a poor land worker's family in Jämsä. In 1897, Aaltonen attended a high school in Jyväskylä at the expense of his female primary school teacher. Aaltonen dropped out of high school in 1903 and joined the Russian Army. In 1904–1905 he served as a lieutenant in the Russo-Japanese War and was later affiliated with the socialist groups of the Russian revolution of 1905. As the revolution failed, Aaltonen was jailed in Moscow and expelled from the military. After his release, Aaltonen returned to Finland and worked for the labour press in Turku, Vyborg and Kotka. In addition to the newspaper articles, he wrote poems and short stories, but they were never published as a book. Occasionally, Aaltonen wrote under the pseudonym Ali Baba. He also worked as a party official for the Social Democrats.

=== In the Finnish Civil War ===
In October 1917, Aaltonen was in Helsinki organizing the Workers' Order Guards, which soon became the Red Guards. After the general strike in November, he was elected the commander-in-chief of the Order Guards as Adolf Taimi refused. This was mainly due to his military experience in Russia. In the beginning of January 1918, Aaltonen travelled to Saint Petersburg to purchase weapons for the Red Guards. Aaltonen, however, started drinking and the Finnish Reds had no clue of his whereabouts. On 13 January, the Red Guard general staff decided to fill his empty office as soon as possible. Despite his heavy drinking in Saint Petersburg, which was known as Petrograd at the time, Aaltonen managed to buy a large cargo of guns and ammunition from the Bolsheviks. Finally, on 28 January, Aaltonen was replaced by Eero Haapalainen. The Civil War had started a day before.

Aaltonen was then moved to the general staff. Together with the Russian colonel Mikhail Svechnikov, he composed a military operation plan for the Red Guards. It was planned for 30 January, and the major offensive was launched ten days later. Aaltonen was sent to Tampere, where he served in the staff of Häme Front, under the command of Svechnikov, Hugo Salmela and Verner Lehtimäki. In the beginning of March, Aaltonen and Svechnikov composed another operation plan for a Red offensive. After the Häme Front collapsed in the north, he left the town on the last day of the Battle of Tampere. On the night between the 5 and 6 April, Aaltonen led a unit of Reds that managed to break through the enemy siege and fled across the ice of lake Näsijärvi.

After some clashes in the Tampere surroundings, Aaltonen and his men joined the refugee column of tens of thousands of Reds who were on their way to the east. At the end of April, their way was closed by the German troops in the village of Nastola near Lahti. Aaltonen was captured and taken to the Hennala camp, where he was shot by the Estonian colonel Hans Kalm in May 1918. He was buried in a mass grave of more than one thousand Reds.

Military offices
Preceded by –	Commander-in-chief of the Red Guards; 30 November 1917–26 January 1918	Succeeded by Eero Haapalainen
