= Hugo Salmela =

Finnish Communist military leader (1884-1918)

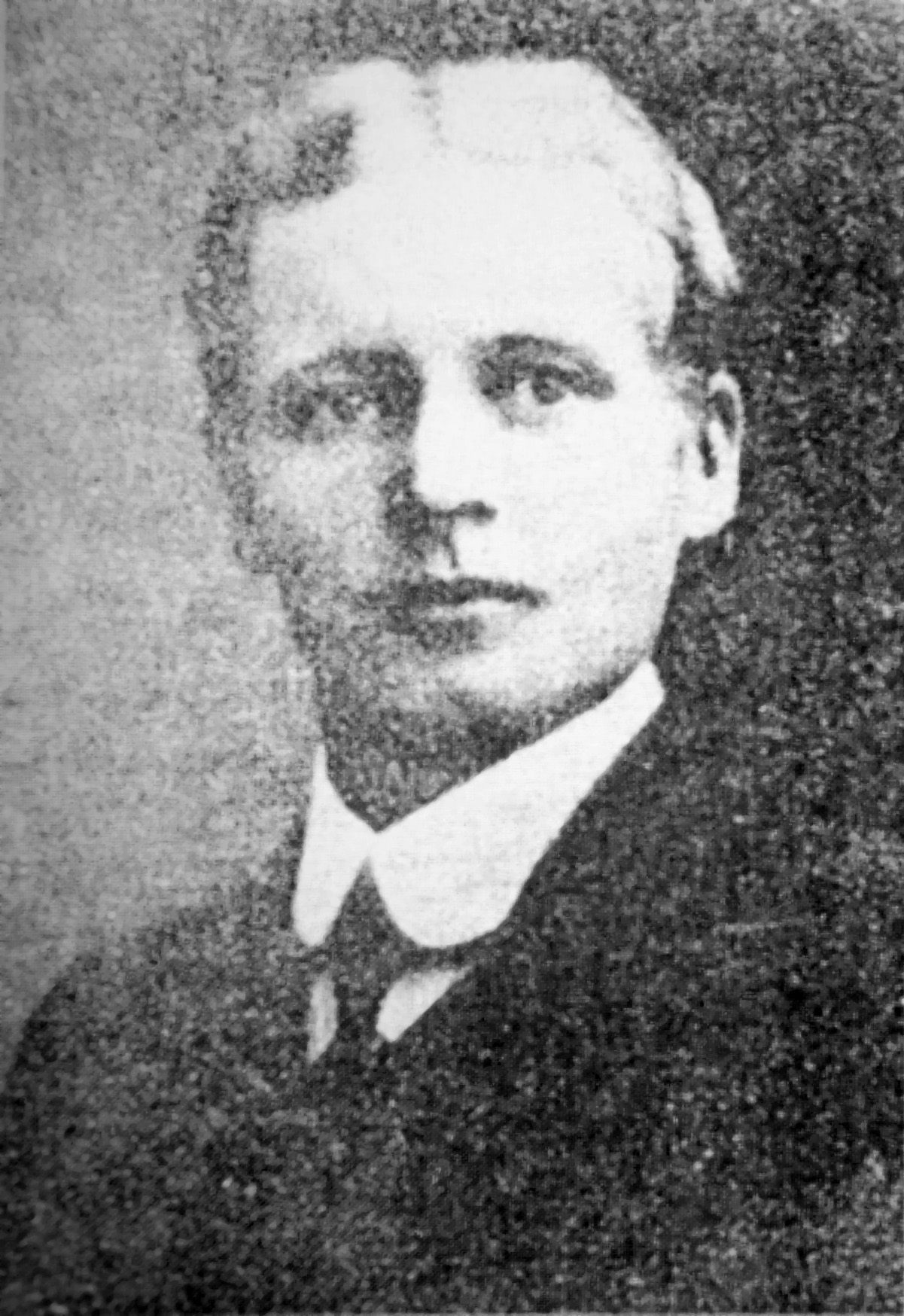
- Born: 13 June 1884; Parikkala, Grand Duchy of Finland
- Died: 28 March 1918 (aged 33); Tampere, Finland
- Military career
- Allegiance: Red Finland
- Branch: Red Guards
- Service years: 1917–1918
- Rank: Commander-in-Chief
- Conflicts: Finnish Civil War

Hugo Salmela (13 June 1884 – 28 March 1918) was one of the Red Guard military leaders in the 1918 Finnish Civil War. He was a saw-mill worker from the town of Kotka in Eastern Finland, without any military background. Salmela was also known as an enthusiastic amateur actor in the local workers' theatre. After the Red Guards were formed in the late 1917, Salmela became the leader of the Kymi Guard.

== Civil War ==
As the Civil War broke out in January 1918, Salmela's skills were noticed by Red leaders Ali Aaltonen and Eero Haapalainen. In late February, he was transferred to Tampere, where Salmela replaced Mikhail Svechnikov as the Commander-in-Chief of the Northern Front. Since Salmela did not have any military training, the Russian lieutenant colonel Georgi Bulatsel became his advisor. During the Battle of Tampere, Salmela led the defence mainly by himself, with instructions from Bulatsel, as Aaltonen was focusing on drinking.

== Death ==
Salmela was accidentally killed in an explosion in March 1918. Kustaa Salminen, the former commander of the Western Front, unintentionally triggered a hand grenade in the Red Guard headquarters and threw it into a basket full of grenades. The explosion killed several members of the Red Guard staff and Salminen himself was injured. Hugo Salmela was first buried at the Red Guard military cemetery in Pyynikinharju, but after the war, the Whites dug up and moved his body into a mass grave at the Kalevankangas Cemetery.
