= Georgy Bulatsel =

Lieutenant colonel in the Imperial Russian Army

- Георгий Викторович Булацель
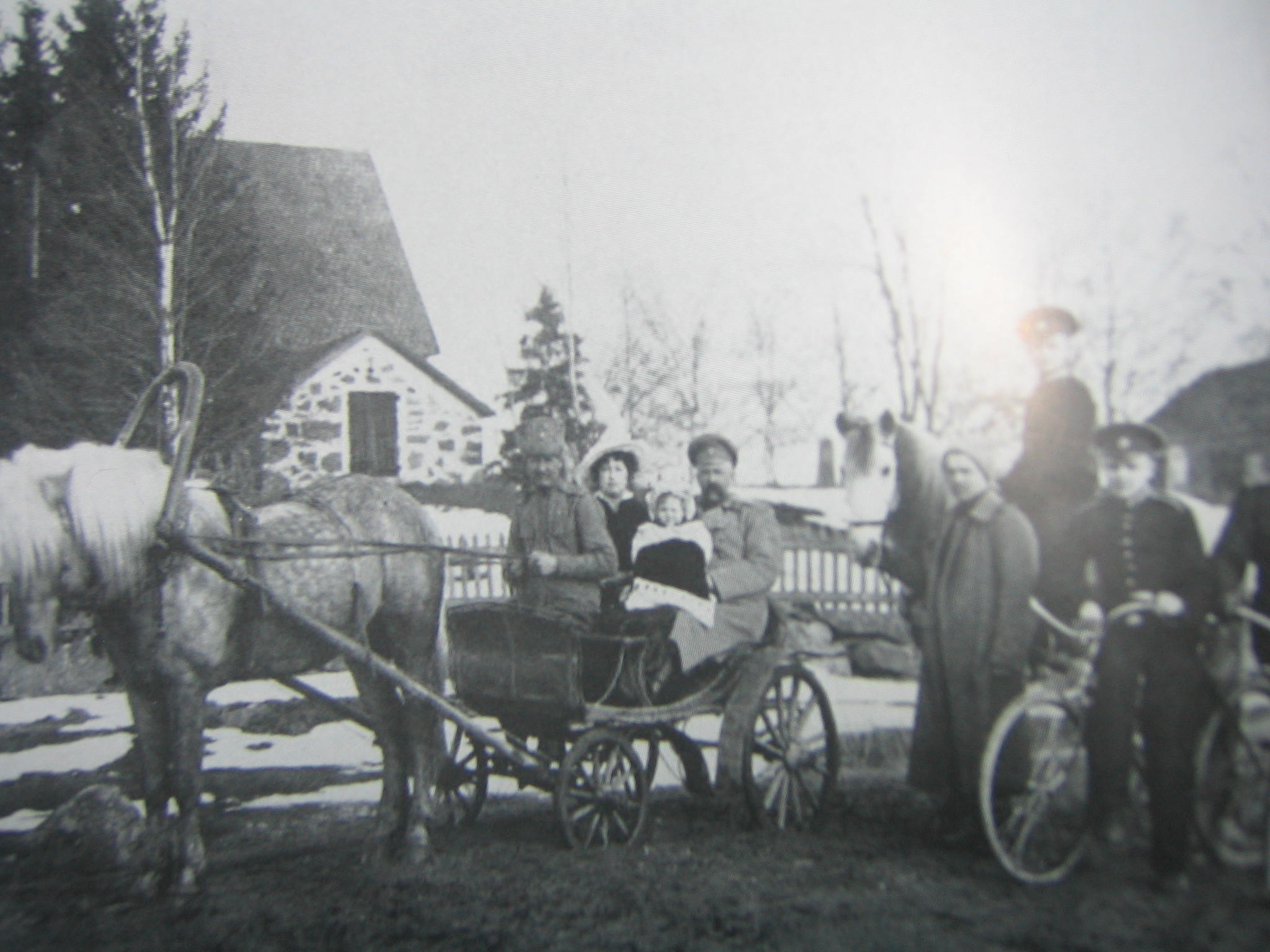
- Georgy Bulatsel and his family by the Kokemäki Church
- Born: 1875; Kharkiv, Russian Empire
- Died: 28 April 1918 (aged 42–43); Tampere, Finland
- Military career
- Allegiance: Russian Empire; Red Finland
- Branch: Imperial Russian Army; Red Guards
- Rank: Lieutenant Colonel (Russia)
- Conflicts: Russo-Japanese War; First World War; Finnish Civil War; Battle of Tampere (executed)

Georgy Viktorovich Bulatsel (Russian: Гео́ргий Ви́кторович Булаце́ль; 1875 – 28 April 1918) was a Russian lieutenant colonel in the Imperial Russian Army. After the Russian Revolution, he was a military advisor for the Red Guards in the 1918 Finnish Civil War. Bulatsel was one of the highest-ranked Russian officers who joined the Finnish Reds.

== Russo-Japanese War and World War I ==
Georgy Bulatsel was born to a noble family in Kharkiv. In 1904–1905 he fought in the Russo-Japanese War and was later transferred to Finland, which was then a part of the Russian Empire. During World War I, Bulatsel fought against the Germans on the Eastern Front but caught typhoid and returned to Finland. Before the 1917 Revolution, Bulatsel was the Commander of the 421th Regiment, based in Rauma, Western Finland.

== Finnish Civil War ==
As the Finnish Civil War started in January 1918, Bulatsel was the Commander of the 1st Brigade of the 106th division in Tampere. In late February, Hugo Salmela replaced Mikhail Svechnikov as the Commander-in-Chief of the Red Guards. Salmela did not have any kind of military training, so Bulatsel became his advisor. After the Battle of Tampere, Bulatsel was arrested by the Whites and executed on 28 April. He was buried at the Kalevankangas Cemetery. Bulatsel's two sons, 13-year-old Woldemar and 15-year-old Nikolai, were shot just a couple of days later in the Vyborg massacre.
