= Kalevankangas Cemetery =

Cemetery in the Kalevanharju district of Tampere, Finland

Coordinates: 61.4933°N 23.7950°E

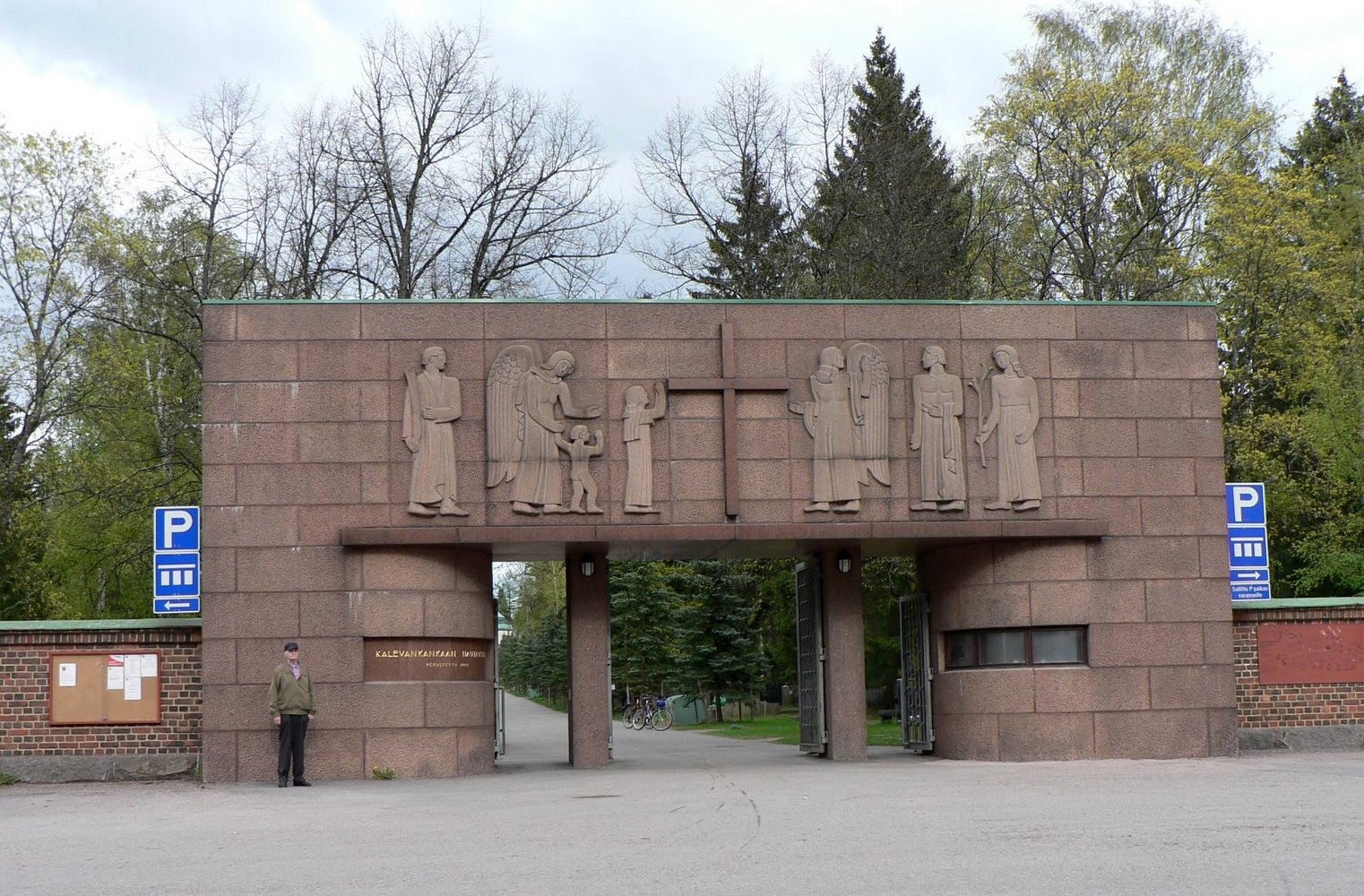
The main gate of the Kalevankangas Cemetery

Kalevankangas Cemetery (Finnish: Kalevankankaan hautausmaa) is a cemetery in the Kalevanharju district within the city of Tampere, Finland.

== History ==
The Kalevankangas Cemetery was consecrated in 1880.

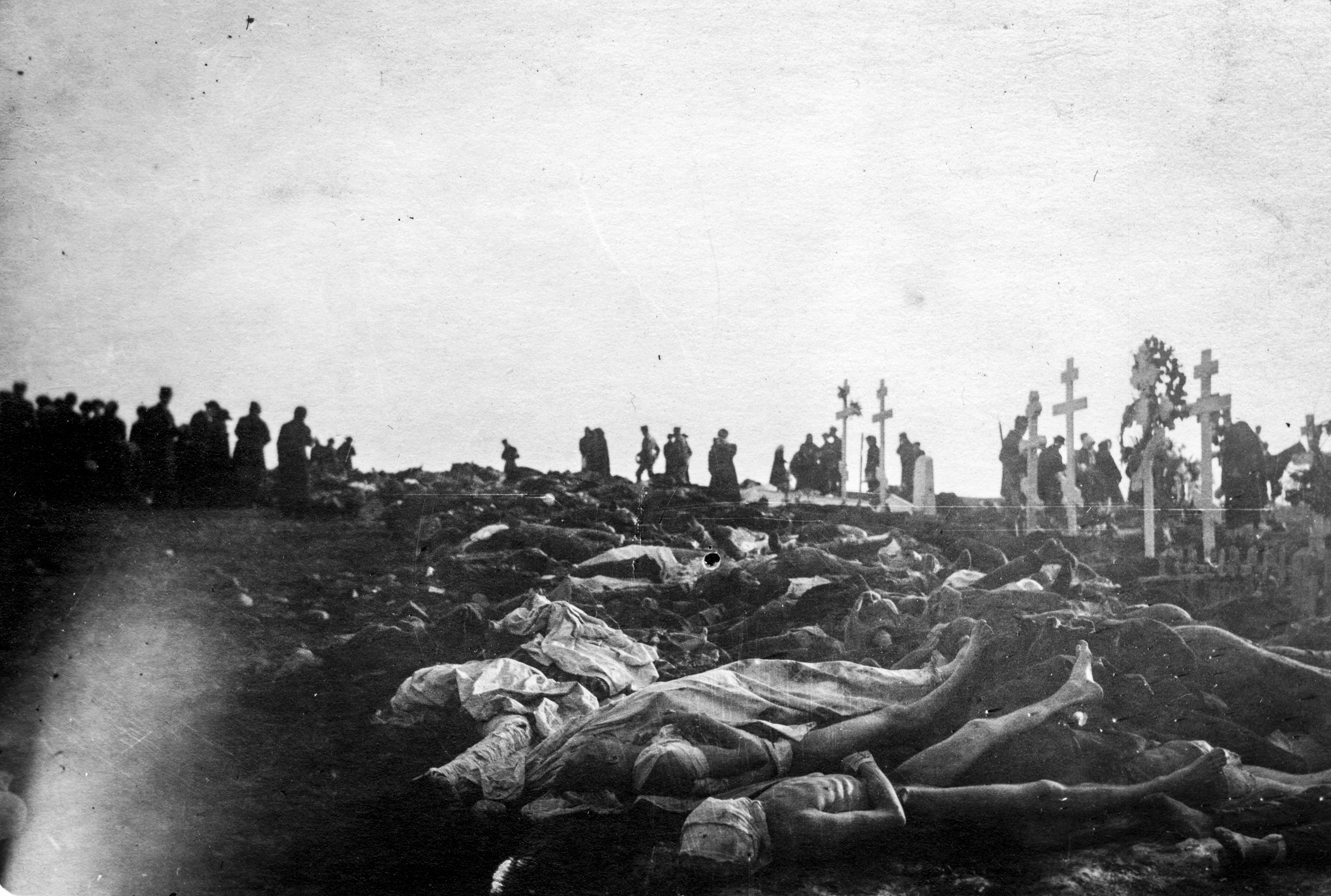
Victims of the Battle of Tampere in Kalevankangas Cemetery

During the Battle of Tampere, Kalevankangas was the scene of much conflict. The first goal of the White Guard had been to take Kalevankangas, the barrack area and the graveyard. The Swedish volunteers were on the right, and the Jägers were on the left. The Reds were protected by the gravestones and White veterans would later recall that it seemed nearly impossible to get to them. The Battle of Tampere was the bloodiest battle of the entire Finnish Civil War, and the bloodiest in Finnish history at that point in time. Kalevankangas Cemetery still has headstones that have been shattered, or which have bullet holes. The killed Reds and those who later died in the Tampere camp were buried in a mass grave of 2,700 people.

In 1928, a memorial was erected to remember the victims of the Imatra cinema fire of 1927, which claimed 21 lives.

== Notable interments ==
- Gustaf Fredrik Ahlgren (1845–1883)
- Rudolf Winter (February 24, 1862, Helsinki – January 30, 1912)
- Kaarlo Vuori (August 19, 1863, Ruovesi – June 22, 1914, Runni)
- Anton Salakari (April 11, 1859 – January 2, 1917)
- Hugo Salmela (June 13, 1884, Parikkala – March 28, 1918, Tampere)
- Georgij Bulatsel (1875, Kharkiv – April 28, 1918, Tampere)
- Hjalmar Backman (September 28, 1882, Tampere – June 13, 1935)
- Arvi Tikkala (October 18, 1906, Helsinki – March 3, 1940, Kollaa)
- Verner Järvinen (March 4, 1870, Ruovesi – January 31, 1941, Tampere)
- Evert Porila (June 30, 1887, Sääksmäki – April 18, 1941)
- Kauno Turkka (November 6, 1898, Finland – January 17, 1944, Finland)
- Tauno Iisalo (July 23, 1916 – June 18, 1947)
- Into Auer (October 16, 1890, Viipuri – May 6, 1948, Tampere)
- Aaro Pajari (July 17, 1897, Asikkala – October 14, 1949, Kokkola)
- Emil Aaltonen (August 29, 1869, Metsäkansa – December 16, 1949, Tampere)
- K. H. Seppälä (March 8, 1881, Kuhmalahti – June 11, 1959, Tampere)
- Bertel Strömmer (July 11, 1890, Ikaalinen – April 18, 1962, Tampere)
- Lauri Viita (December 17, 1916, Pirkkala – December 22, 1965, Helsinki)
- Jarmo Wasama (December 2, 1943, Elimäki – February 2, 1966, Tampere)
- Vilho Tuulos (March 26, 1895, Tampere – September 2, 1967, Tampere)
- Julius Saaristo (July 21, 1891, Tampere – October 12, 1969, Tampere)
- Paavo Viljanen (June 17, 1904, Karstula – February 10, 1972, Tampere)
- Arvo Tuominen (September 5, 1894, Hämeenkyrö – May 27, 1981, Tampere)
- Uuno Sinisalo (1904–1985)
- Matti Järvinen (February 18, 1909, Tampere – July 22, 1985, Helsinki)
- Vera Telenius (September 24, 1912, Sahalahti – August 5, 1991, Tampere)
- Oskar Paarma (1905–1994)
- Hans Wind (July 30, 1919, Ekenäs – July 24, 1995, Tampere)
- Unto Oksala (March 15, 1915, Jyväskylä – August 6, 1995, Tampere)
- Vili Auvinen (November 11, 1931, Lohja – August 2, 1996)
- Seppo Rannikko (April 6, 1928, Tampere – November 25, 2000, Tampere)
- Martti Tapola (May 29, 1931 – May 16, 2001)
- Osmo Alaja (January 28, 1915, Helsinki – June 30, 2001, Tampere)
- Jorma Karhunen (March 17, 1913, Pyhäjärvi – January 21, 2002, Finland)
- Veikko Sinisalo (September 30, 1926, Riihimäki – December 16, 2003, Tampere)
- Tuulikki Pohjola (June 11, 1920, Helsinki – September 21, 2005, Tampere)
- Kikka Sirén (October 26, 1964, Tampere – December 3, 2005, Nokia)
- Goony Strömmer (November 6, 1914, Ikaalinen – June 2, 2006, Tampere)
- Juice Leskinen (February 19, 1950, Juankoski – November 24, 2006, Tampere)
- Veikko Pihlajamäki (June 25, 1921, Karkku – December 20, 2006)
- Markku Peltola (July 12, 1956, Helsinki – December 31, 2007, Kangasala)
- Helge Perälä (June 3, 1915, Vehkalahti – February 13, 2010, Tampere)
- Mirkka Rekola (June 26, 1931, Tampere – February 5, 2014, Helsinki)

== Gallery ==
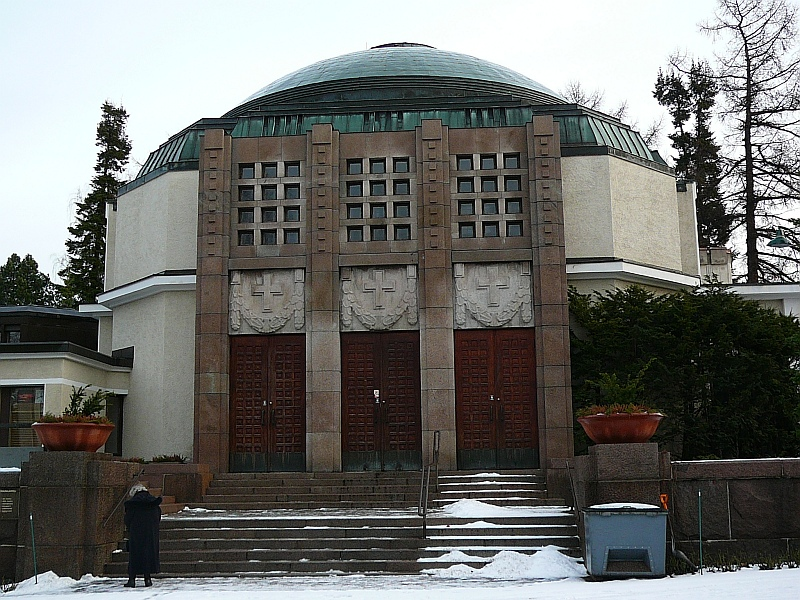
The chapel at Kalevankangas Cemetery

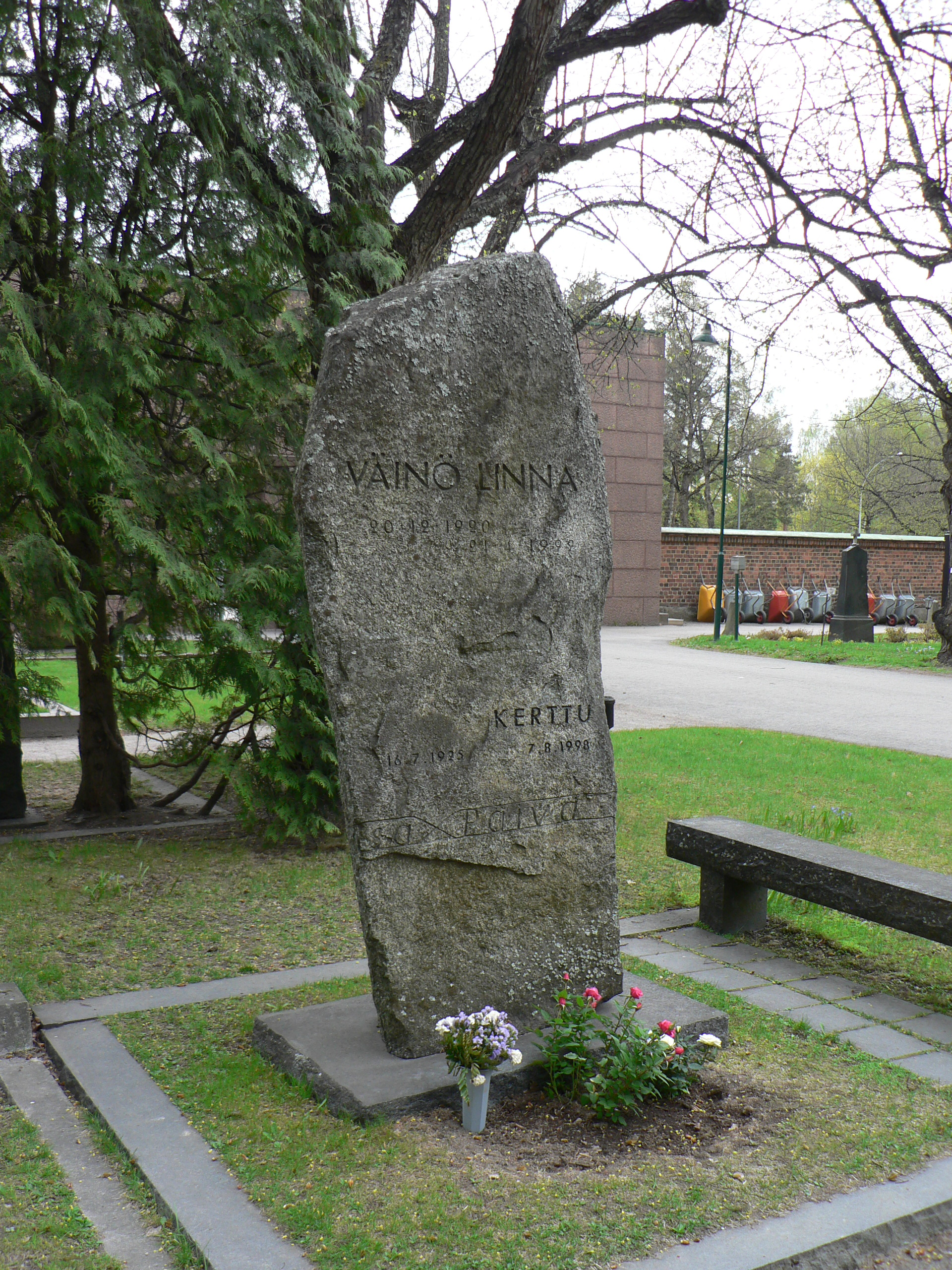
Väinö Linna's grave

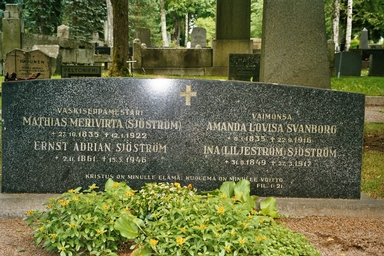
Matti Merivirta's grave

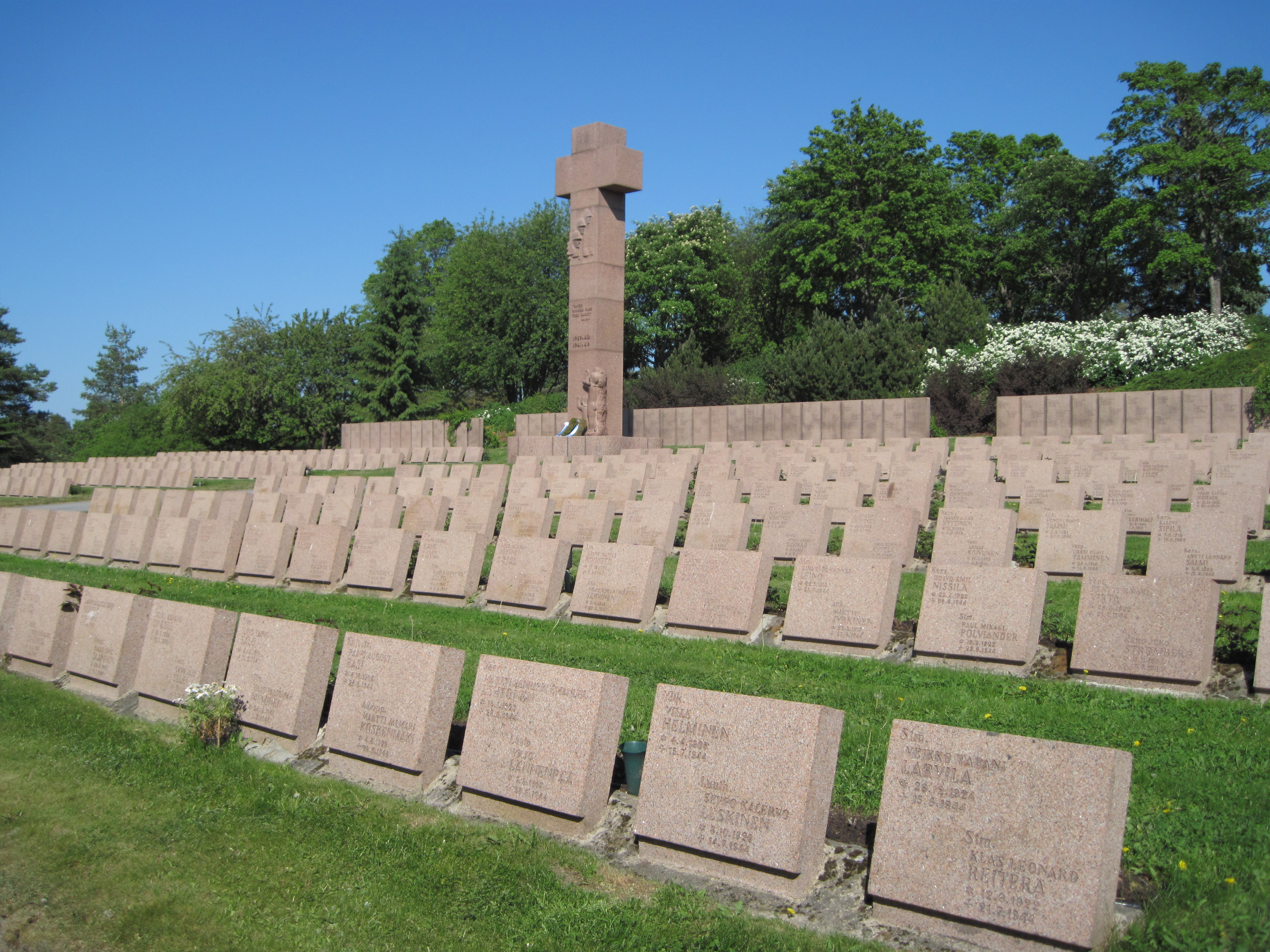
Military cemeteries.

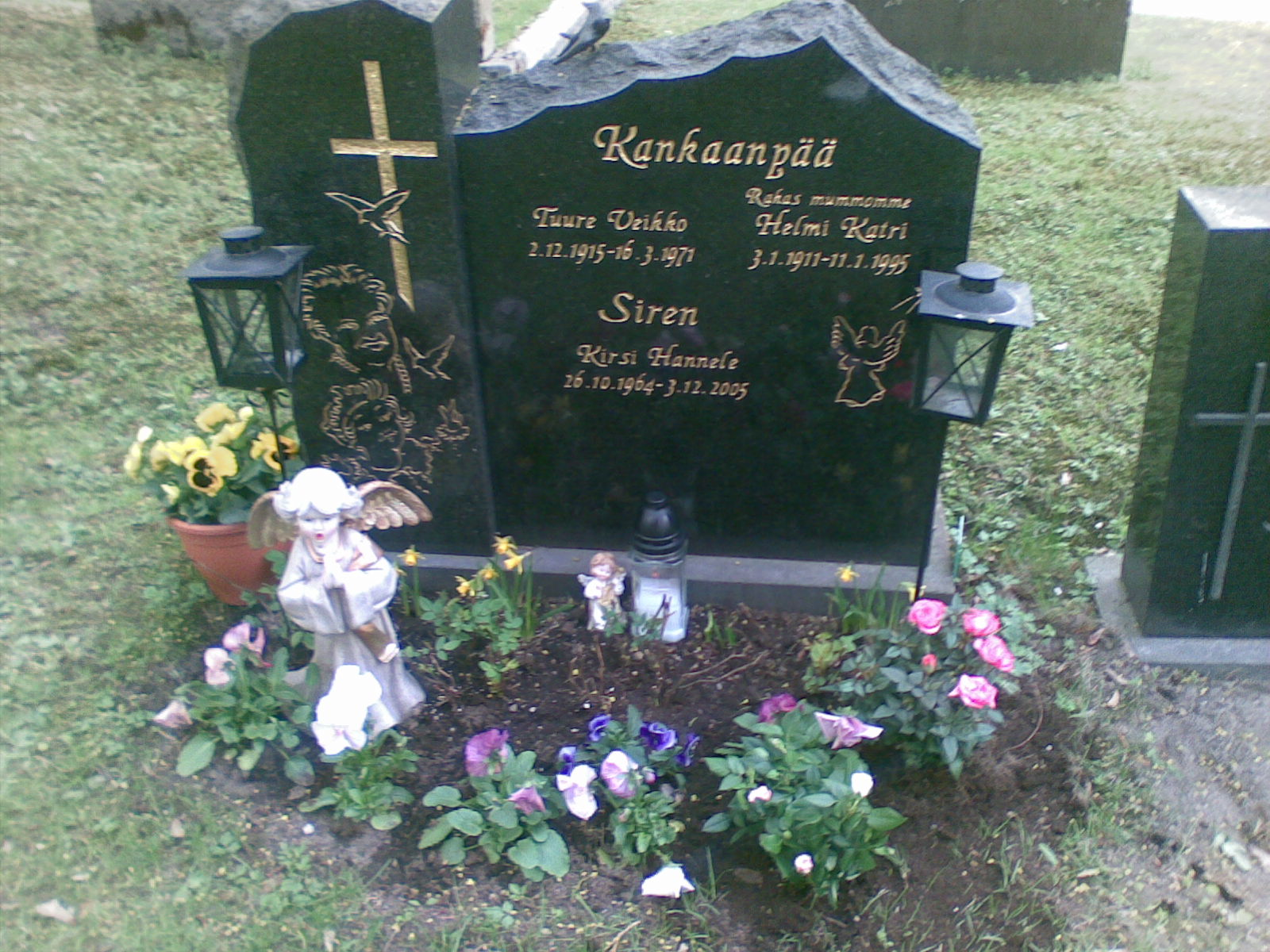
The grave of Kikka Sirén

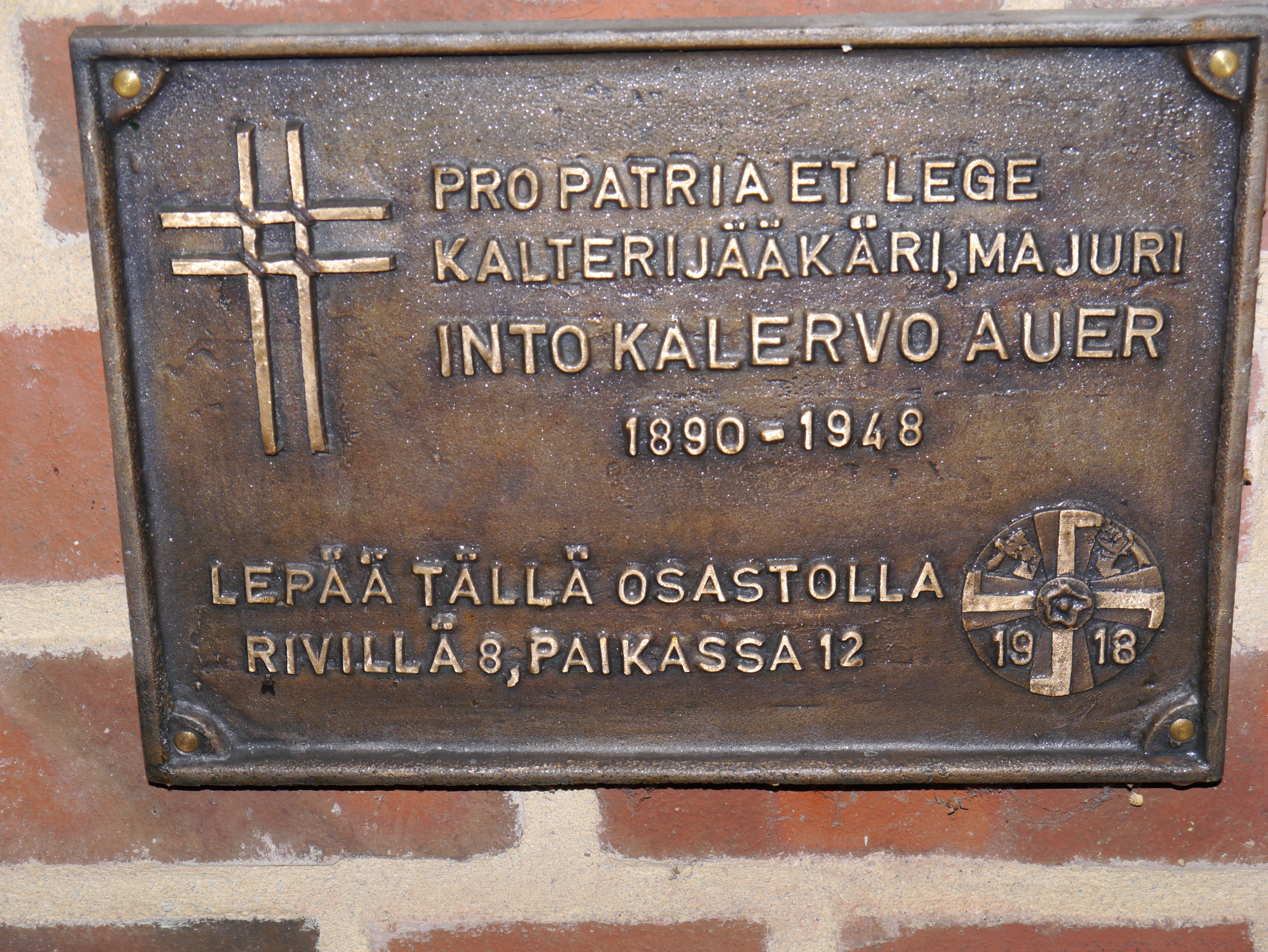
A sign for the burial place of Into Auer

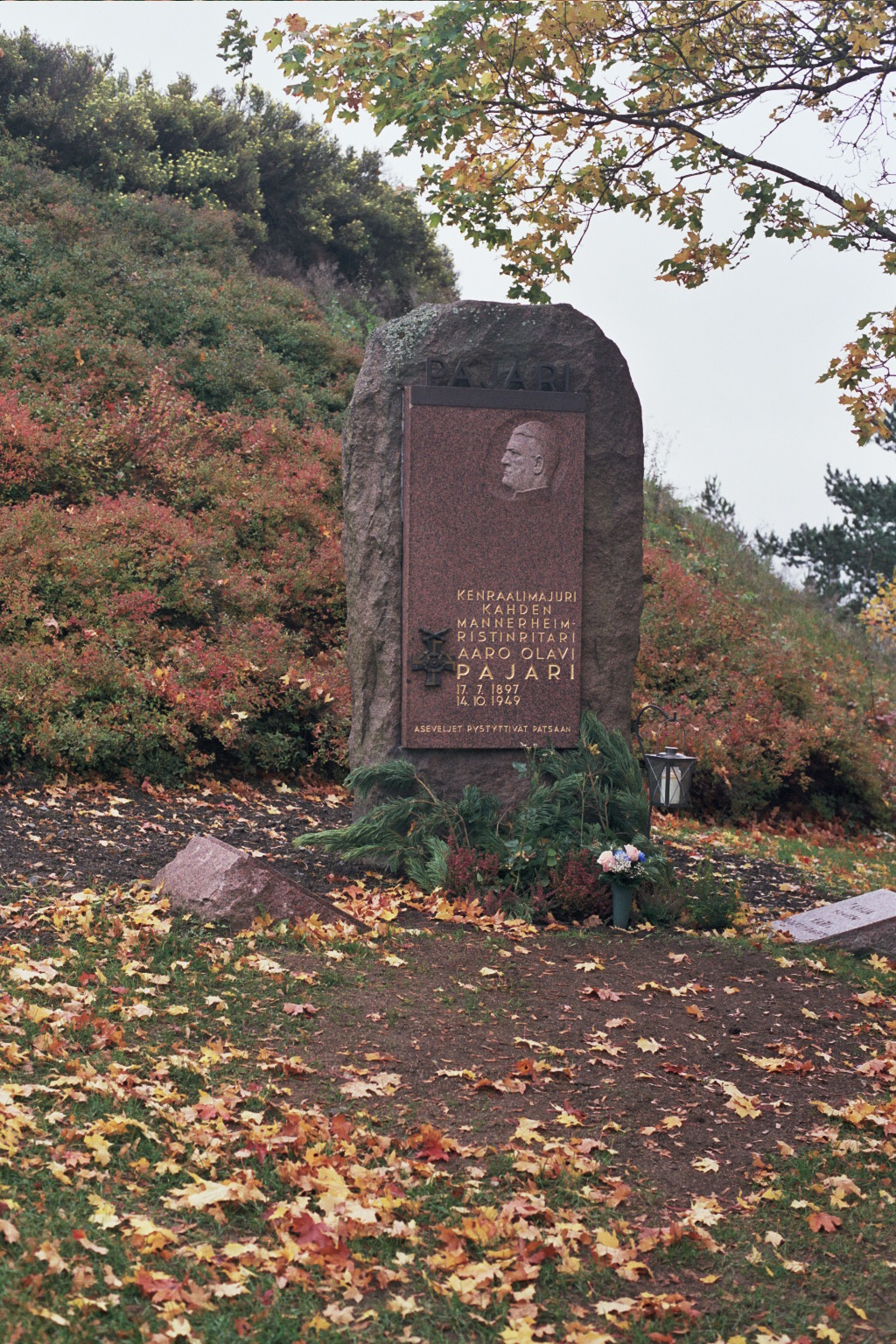
The grave of Aaro Pajari

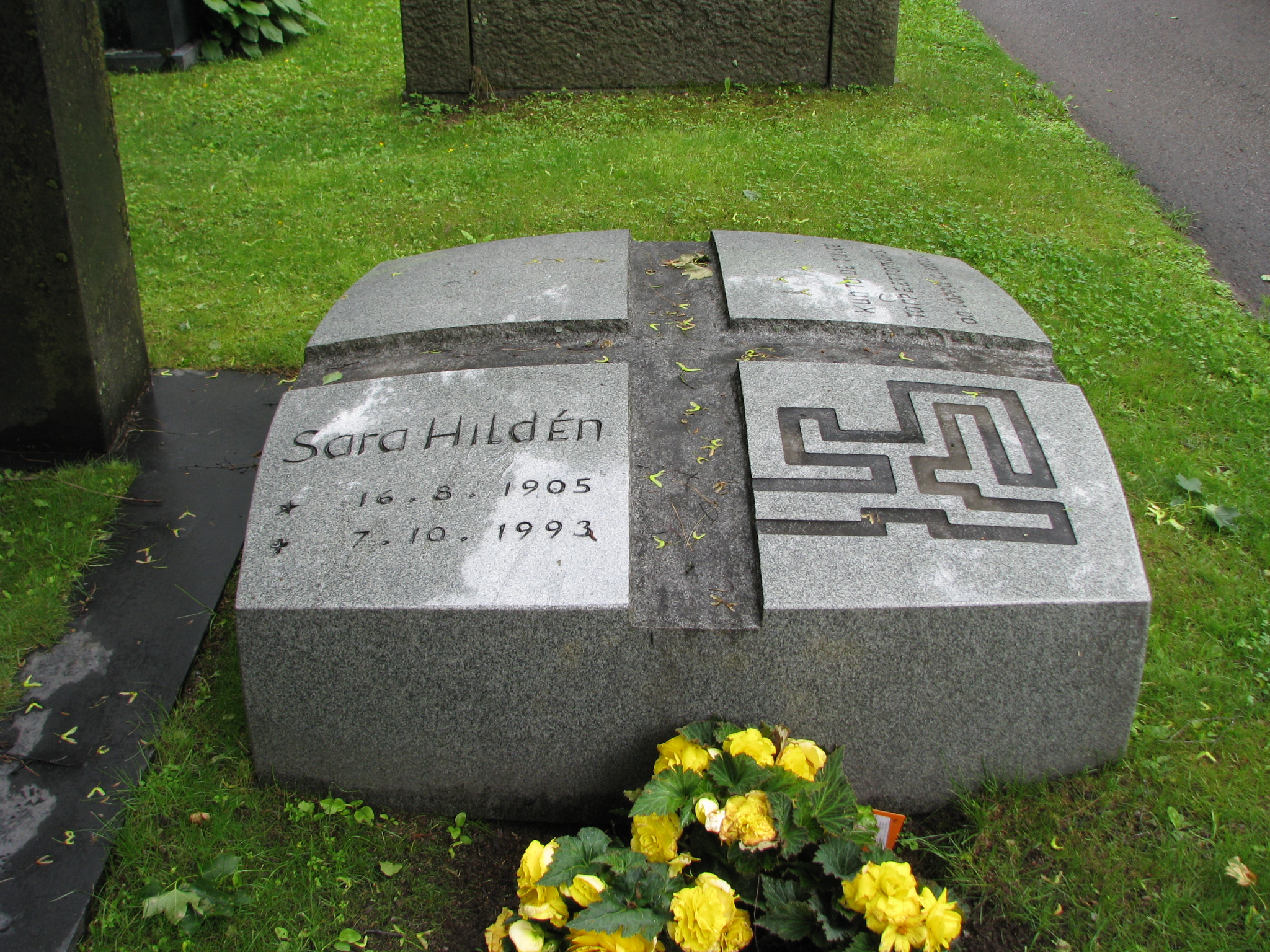
The grave of Sara Hildén

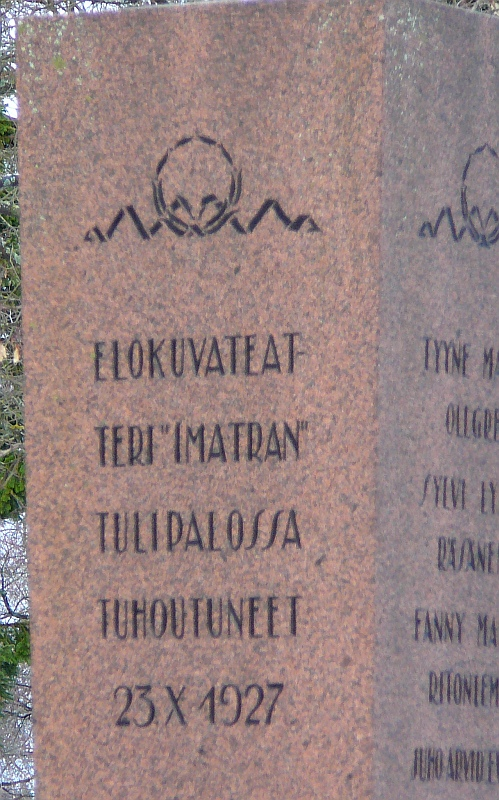
Memorial dedicated to the victims of the Imatra disaster of 1927.

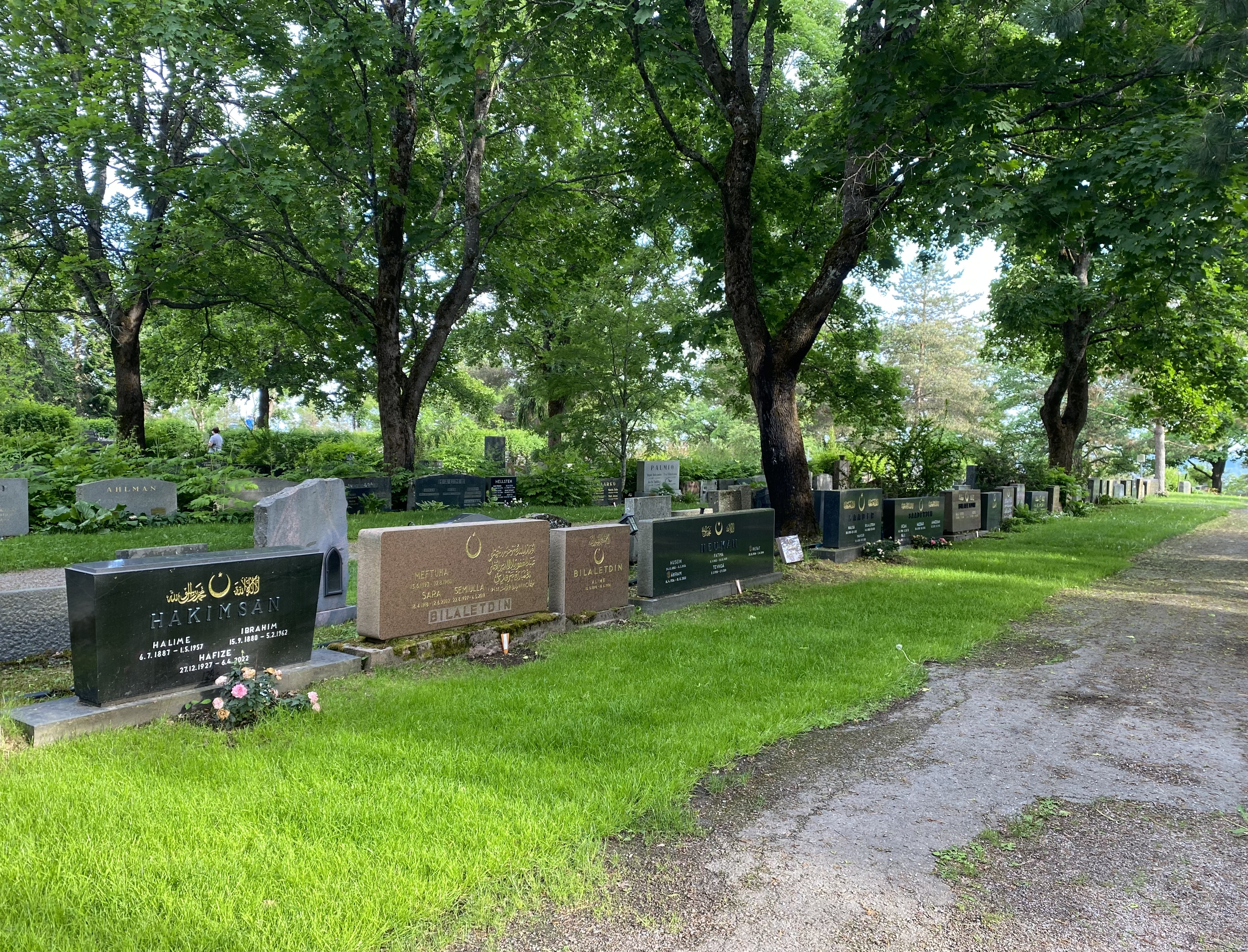
A section for the Islamic Tatar community of Tampere.
