= Juhani Siljo =

Finnish poet and translator

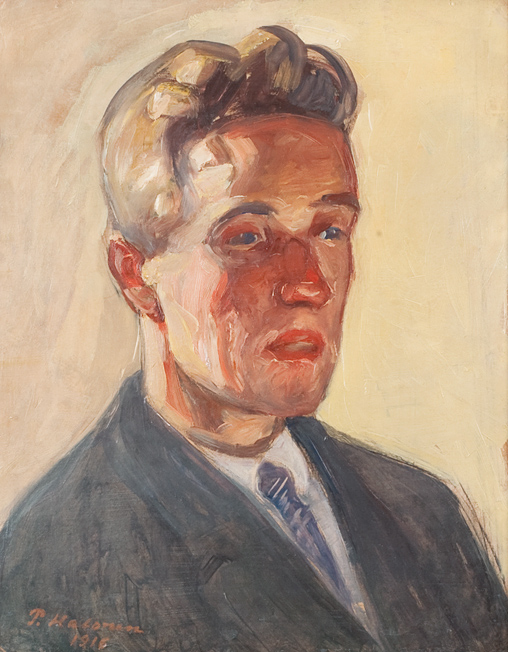
- Portrait of Juhani Siljo by Pekka Halonen, 1916.
- Born: 3 May 1888; Oulu, Grand Duchy of Finland
- Died: 6 May 1918 (aged 30); Tampere, Finland
- Cause of death: Killed in action

Juhani Siljo (3 May 1888 – 6 May 1918) was a Finnish poet and translator.

Siljo was born as Johan Alarik Sjögren in Oulu. He completed the Oulun Lyseon Lukio upper secondary school in 1907, and started studies in the University of Helsinki at the same year, but never graduated, instead he focused on writing. He wrote poems, essays and translated authors like Novalis, Friedrich Schiller, Goethe, Friedrich Nietzsche and Charles Baudelaire.

Siljo also worked as an editor in the newspaper Helsingin Sanomat and the periodical Valvoja. From 1915 to 1916 he worked as a library assistant in Jyväskylä.

Siljo was on the side of the White Guards in the Finnish Civil War. He was wounded and captured by the Red Guards in a battle in Orivesi. He died in a military hospital in Tampere after the Battle of Tampere had ended in the victory of the Whites.

== Selected works ==
=== Poetry ===
- Runoja (WSOY 1910)
- Maan puoleen (1914)
- Selvään veteen (Otava 1919)

=== Others ===
- Rajankäyntejä : Esseitä kirjallisuudesta 1910-1917 (Essays on literature) (Suomalaisen kirjallisuuden seura 1991)
- Seppelöity : murheellinen komedia (Play) (WSOY 1918)
