= Oulun Lyseo Upper Secondary School =

- Oulun Lyseon lukio Uleåborgs Lyseos gymnasium
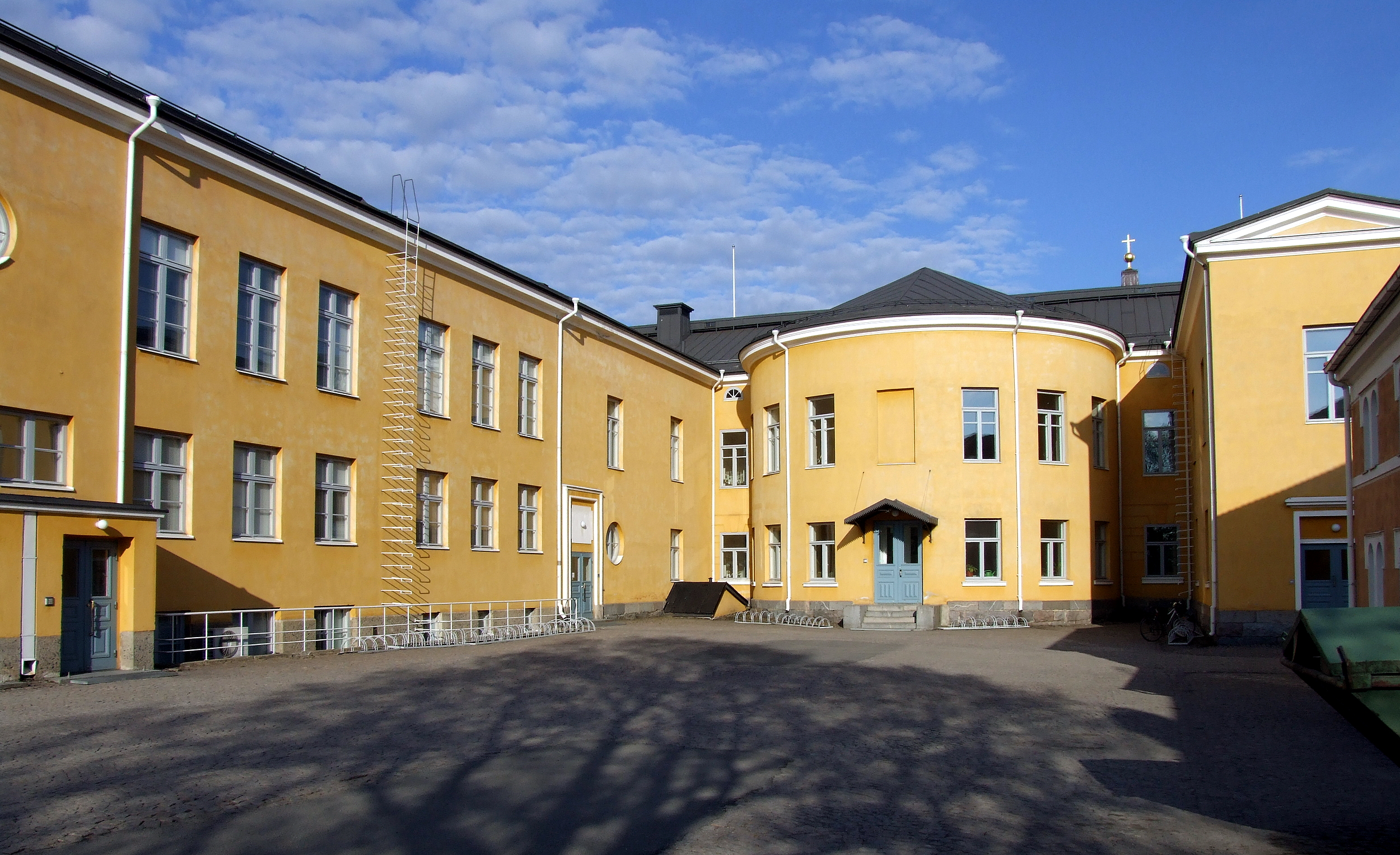

Location
- Kajaaninkatu 3 Oulu, 90100; Finland
- 65°00.9′N 025°28.3′E

Information
- School type: Public school
- Established: 1874; 152 years ago
- Principal: Mika Aalto
- Teaching staff: ca. 60
- Age range: 16+
- Website: https://www.ouka.fi/en/oulun-lyseo

Oulun Lyseon Lukio (Oulu Lyseo Upper Secondary School) is a Finnish upper secondary school in the city of Oulu in northern Finland. The school has over 60 teachers and about 750 students. In addition to the Finnish national curriculum the school provides the option to study the International Baccalaureate programme in English. Since 2018 Lyseo has a distance teaching campus in the small town of Tyrnävä. In 2018 255 students, of which 50 took the IB programme, were accepted to the school .

== History ==
In the autumn of 1874, Oulun lyseo started as a private Lyceum and it adopted Finnish as the official academical language. During the 1880s the school was admitted state aid and gradually the schools ownership was changed as state owned. In 1891 the first graduates were graduated from the state owned Oulun Lyseo.

Since 1992 Oulun Lyseon lukio has been authorized to teach the IB Diploma Programme.

== Building ==
Oulun Lyseo moved to the current school building in 1890. The building representing neoclassical style was designed by architect Carl Ludvig Engel and built in 1831 as a Trivial school, which was the first school in the northern Finland that lead to university studies. Descendant of this old school nowadays is the University Teacher Training School (Oulun Normaalikoulun lukio). The building has been extended several times during its history.

== Notable alumni ==
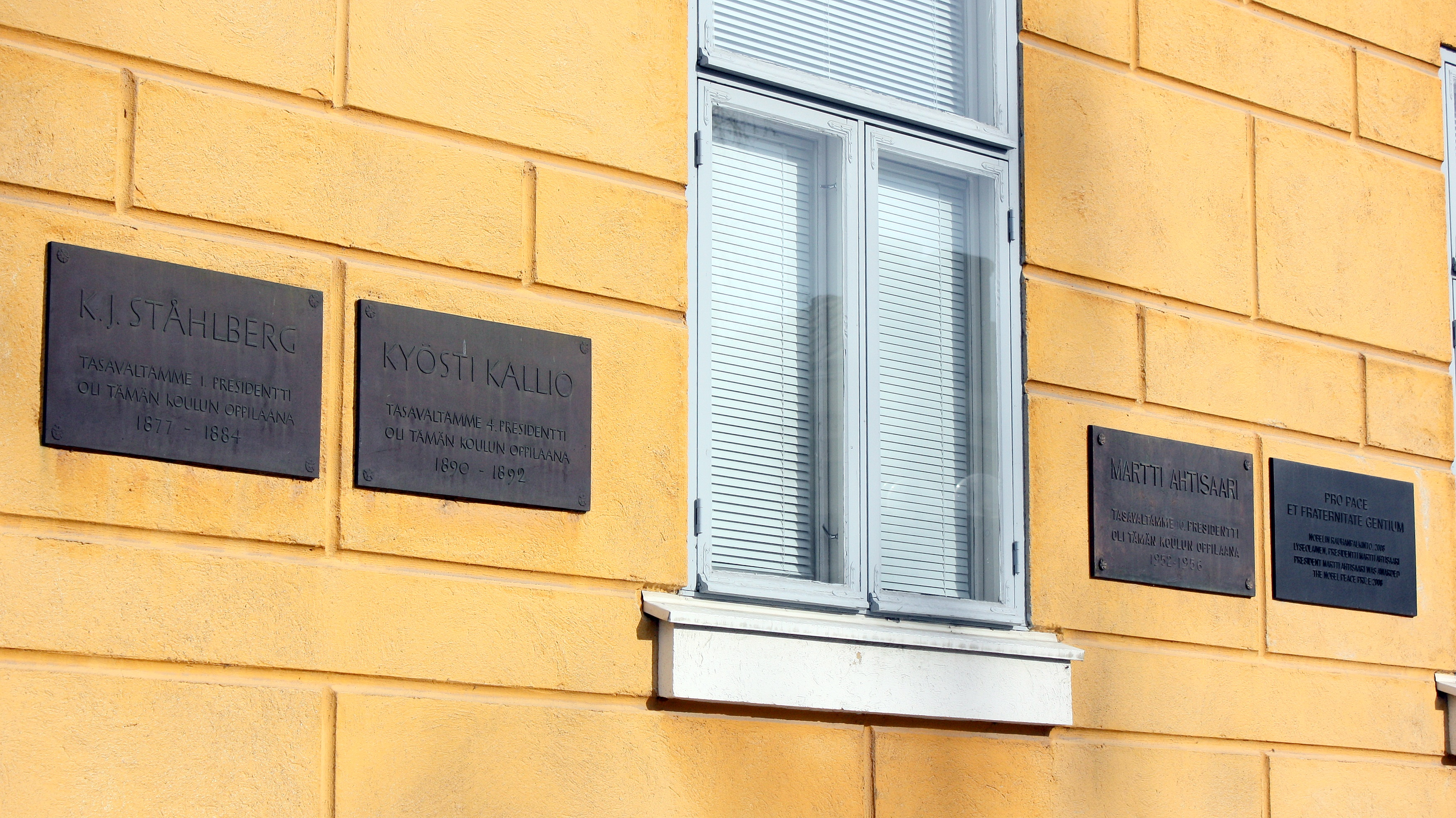
Plaques for the three presidents that have attended Oulun Lyseo.

- Kaarlo Juho Ståhlberg, President of Finland
- Kyösti Kallio, President of Finland
- Martti Ahtisaari, President of Finland, Nobel Peace Prize laureate
- Ensio Siilasvuo, General
- Teuvo Pakkala, Novelist
- Juhani Siljo, Writer
- Ilmari Kianto, Novelist, poet
- Paavo Rintala, Novelist
- Veikko Antero Koskenniemi, poet
- Eino Leino, poet
- Aaro Hellaakoski, poet
- Leevi Madetoja, Composer
