= Pyynikki Esker =

Geological feature in Tampere, Finland

Coordinates: 61°29′46.17744″N 23°43′35.82390″E

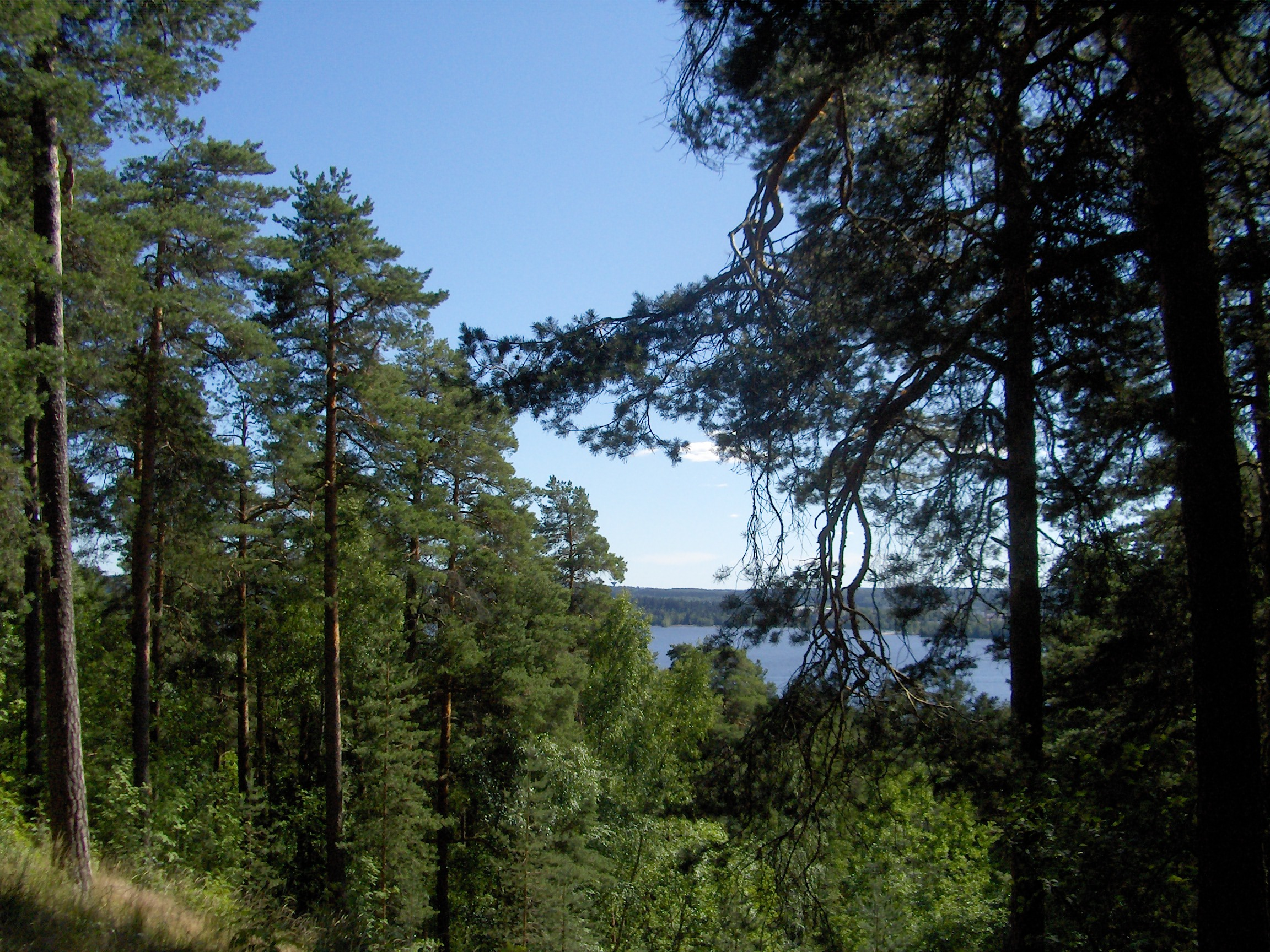
The Pyynikki Esker

The Pyynikki Esker (or the Pyynikki Ridge; Finnish: Pyynikinharju) is the tallest longitudinal esker in the world, located in Pyynikki, Tampere, Finland. The ridge rises to a height of 160 meters above sea level and 80 meters above the surface of Lake Pyhäjärvi. The Pyynikki Esker belongs to the ridge formation that extends from South Ostrobothnia to Salpausselkä. The ridge formation continues west of the Pyynikki Esker as a rocky ridge known as the Pispala Esker (Pispalanharju) and Tahmela. To the east, after the settlement of Tampere, the ridge becomes the Kalevankangas esker, where there has been a cemetery by same name for almost 150 years. In Kangasala, the ridge formation continues as the four ridges called Kirkkoharju, Kuohunharju, Keisarinharju and Vehoniemenharju. The Pyynikki Esker, like longitudinal ridges, is mainly gravel and sand.

There are still some old European red pines growing in Pyynikki, whose roots are partly in the air, as the sandy ground rolls down towards Lake Pyhäjärvi over the years. Vegetation on gravel ridges has not only pines but also junipers that are protected. However, juniper berries can be picked, keeping in mind that the branches should not be folded or the juniper should not be removed from the ground. There also grows Norway maples, which give the ridge a beautiful color in autumn. Mountain currants also grow on these ridges. In the middle of the heathers are golden chanterelles and in the autumn a few other edible mushrooms. Lingonberries also thrive on the southern slopes.

The Pyynikki observation tower, built in 1929, is still in use. It has a ground-level café. There are wooden stairs at several points on the slopes of Pyynikki leading to the top of the Pyynikki Esker from the shore of Lake Pyhäjärvi.

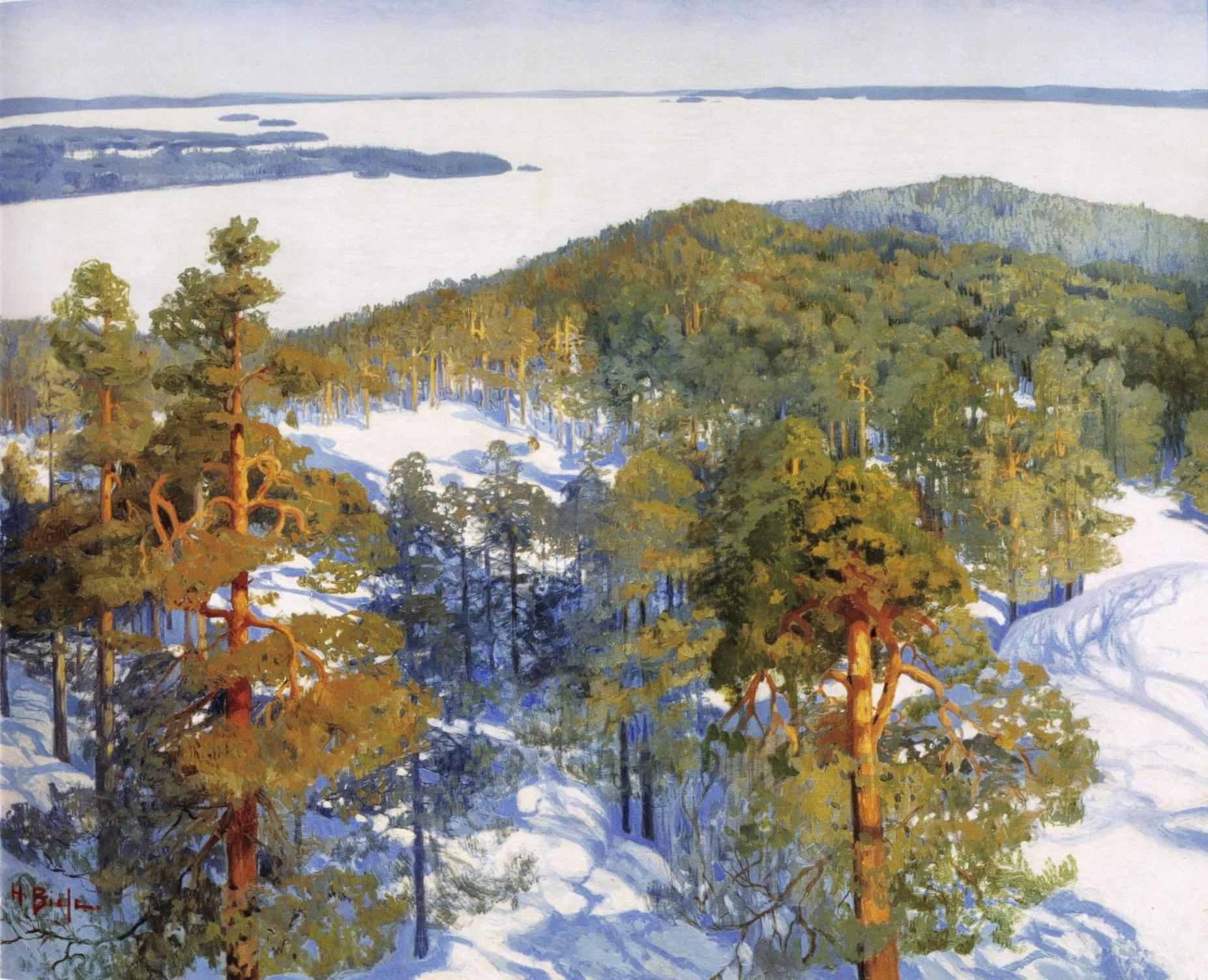
The Winter View from Pyynikki by Helmi Biese (1900)

== See also ==
- Kaakinmaa
- Pyynikinrinne
