= Pyynikki observation tower =

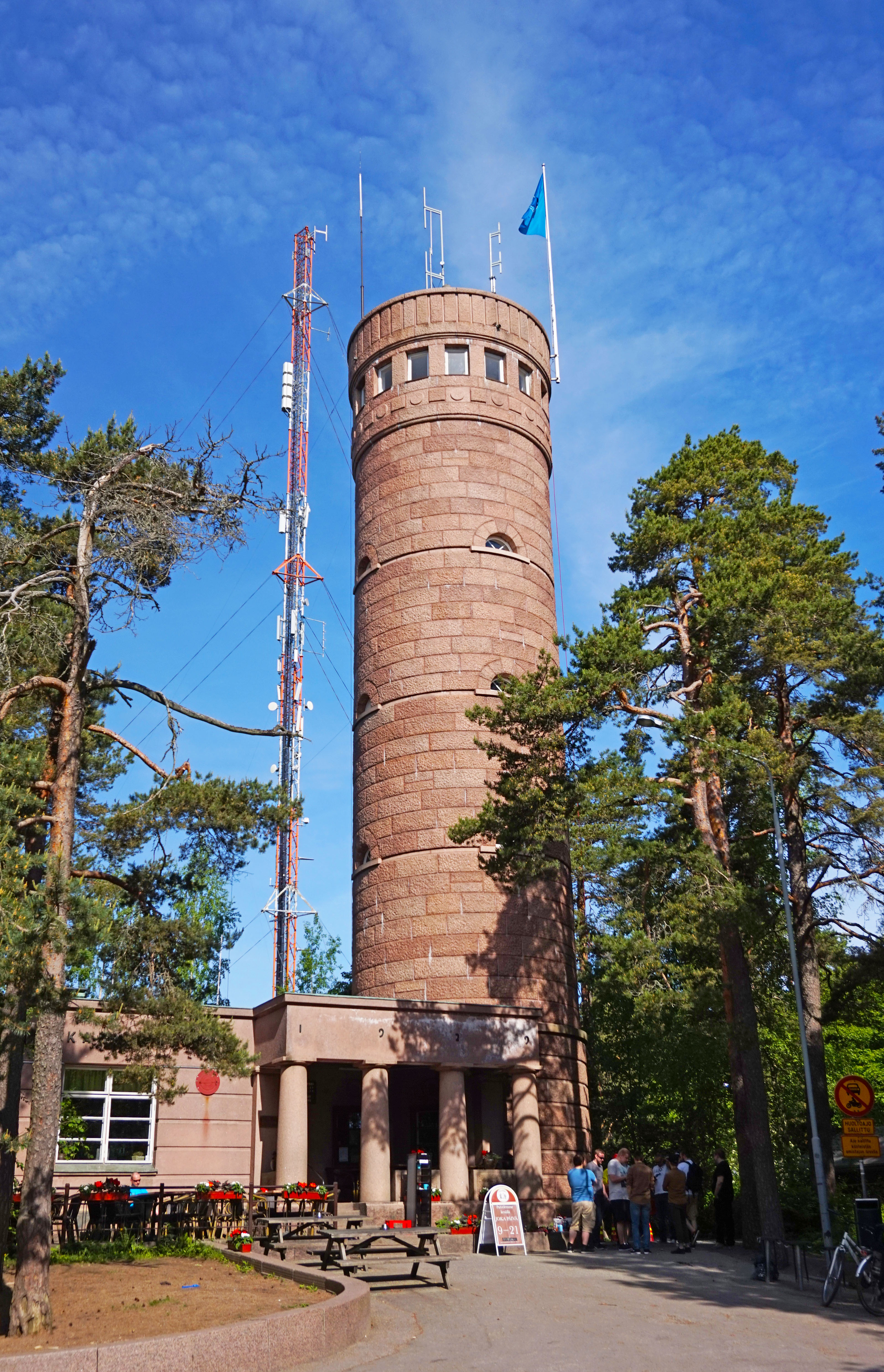
- Interactive map of the Pyynikki observation tower area

General information
- Type: Observation, restaurant
- Location: Pyynikki, Tampere, Finland
- Coordinates: 61°29.78′N 023°43.92′E
- Completed: 1929

Height
- Antenna spire: 26 m (85.3 ft)

Design and construction
- Architect: Vilho Kolho

The Pyynikki observation tower (Finnish: Pyynikin näkötorni) is a 26 meter observation tower in Pyynikki, a district and a nature reserve in Tampere, Finland. It was completed in 1929 by the design of the city architect Vilho Kolho, and built using local red granite. The tower stands 75 meters above the level of the adjacent lake Pyhäjärvi (152 meters above the sea level) on the ridge crest of the Pyynikki Esker.

The top can be reached by a lift, but walking up the stairs offers various observation windows. The open top offers a clear view of the city of Tampere as well as lake Näsijärvi on the north and lake Pyhäjärvi in the south. Entrance to the park and cafe is free but climbing the tower costs 3 euros for adults and 2 euros for children (up to 15 years). The Cafe has its own historic doughnut recipe which has remained unchanged for 40 years.

== History ==
Pyynikki has been a park and place of natural beauty since the 1830s and the first cafe within Pyynikki was opened in 1868. The first observation tower was built in 1888 by the design of the architect Georg Schreck, but it was damaged in the 1918 Battle of Tampere. Rebuilding plans started from 1925 and the new tower and cafe was opened in 1929 for the city's 150th anniversary. The opening ceremonies were postponed due to the sinking of the steam ship Kuru which caused the loss of 136 lives.

In the late 1960s and 1970s, the City of Tampere built the modern Näsinneula tower which replaced Pyynikki's role as a tourist attraction aimed at foreign tourists, leaving Pyynikki mostly for local visitors and other Finns and as a hidden gem for foreign tourists.

Pyynikki observation tower is listed as a Cultural environment of national significance by the Finnish National Board of Antiquities.
