= Koskipuisto =

Park in Tampere, Finland

Coordinates: 61°30′0″N 23°45′54″E

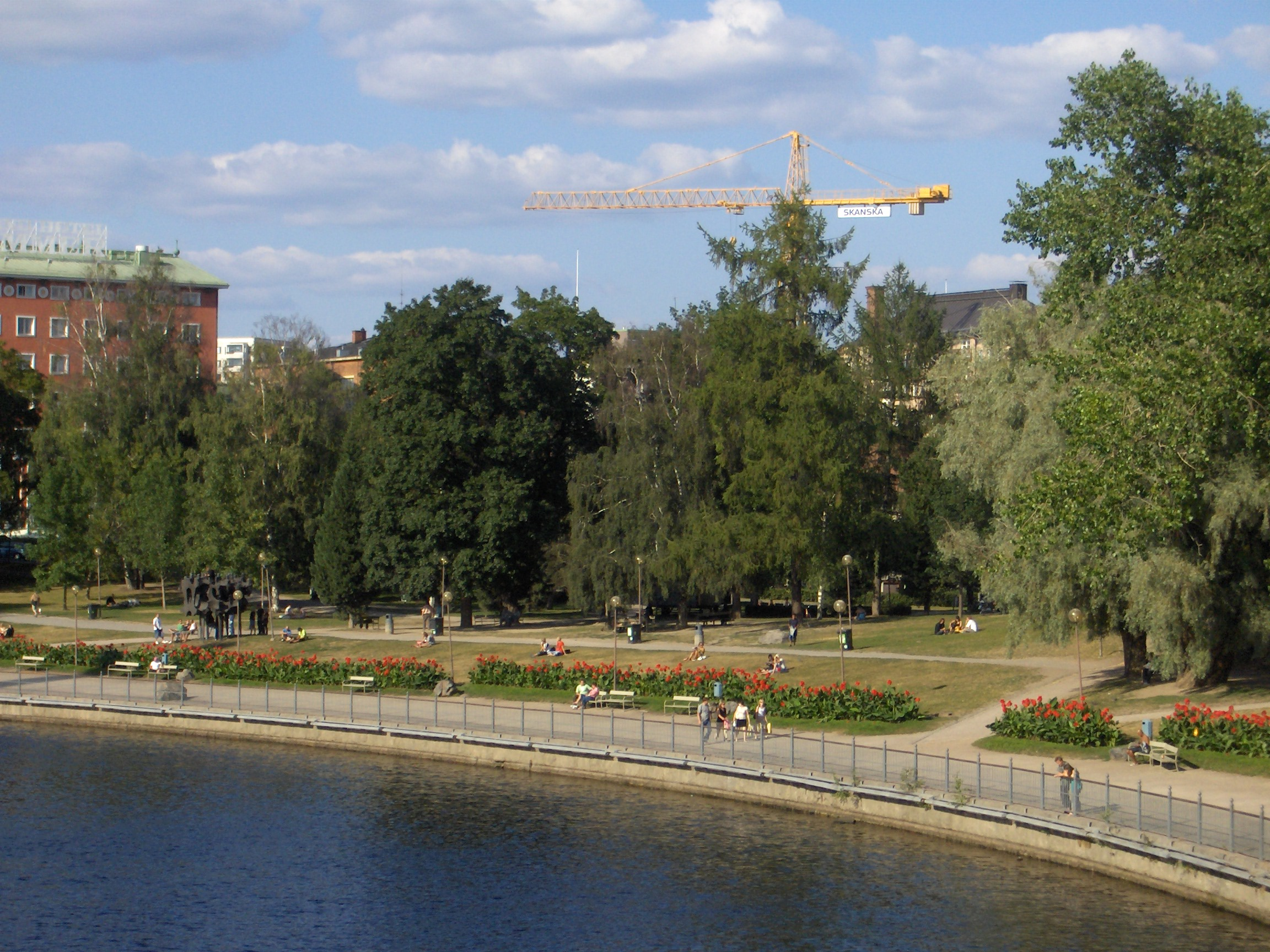
There are many old trees in Koskipuisto. At the right the grey-leaved white willows planted in the early 20th century, the oldest trees in the park, can be seen.

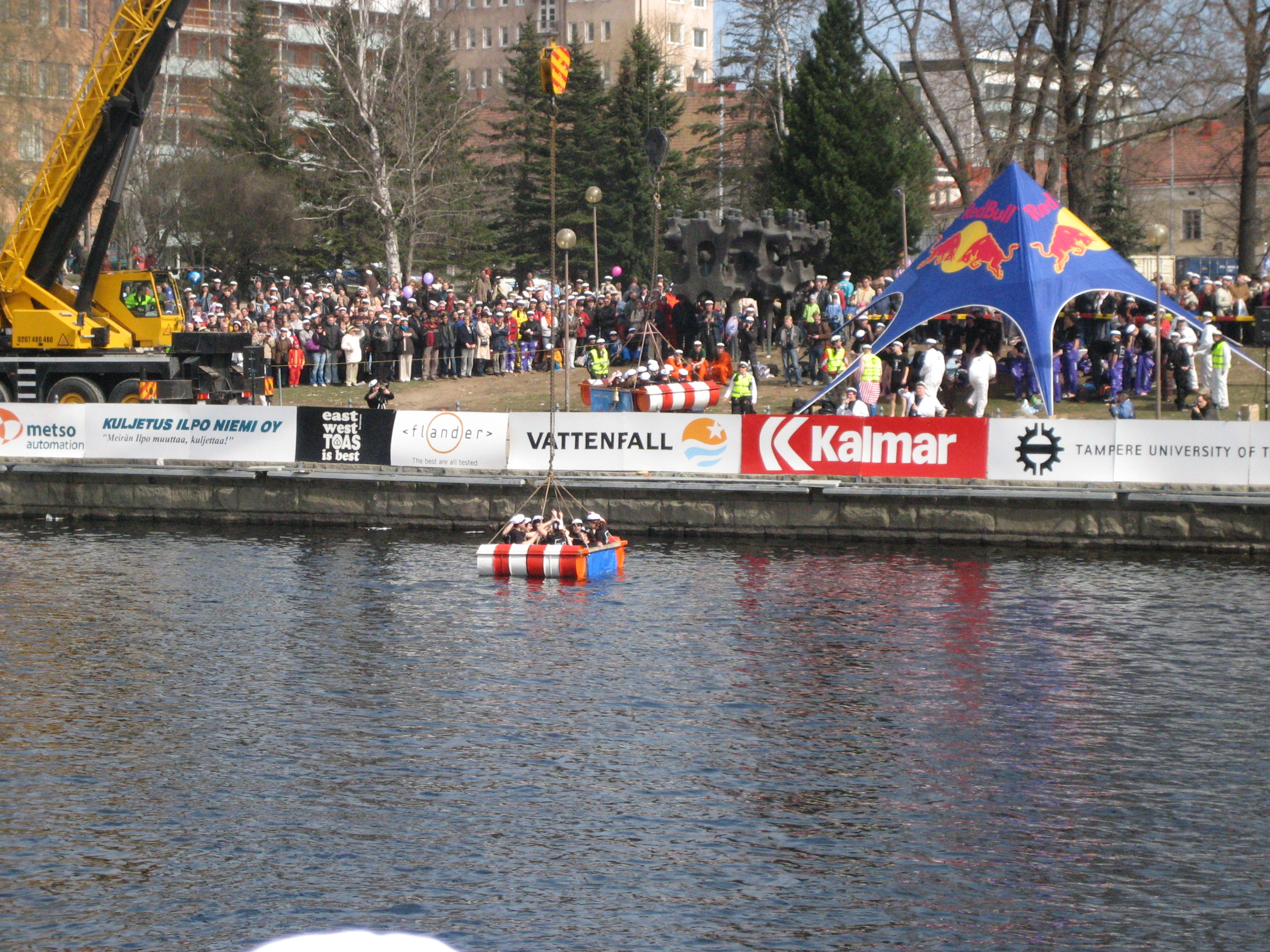
It is a part of the technology student tradition to dip first-year students at the Tampere University of Technology in water at International Workers' Day on 1 May. This is done at Koskipuisto.

Koskipuisto (Finnish for "rapids park") is a park in Kyttälä, Tampere, Finland, to the east of the Tammerkoski rapids. On the opposite shore of the rapids is the Kirjastonpuisto park - which is sometimes considered part of Koskipuisto. The Tammerkoski rapids with its coasts belongs to the national landscapes of Finland.

The coast was designated as a park already in the first zoning plan of Kyttälä made by architect F. L. Calonius in 1886. Construction of the park started in the 1890s together with the renovation of Kyttälä, and it was completed at the turn of the century. The park reached as far as south of Hämeenkatu, but the construction of the Hatanpään valtatie road and the new Hämeensilta bridge significantly contracted its southern part. Nowadays the park area south of Hämeenkatu is known as Verkatehtaanpuisto.

In the 1930s Koskipuisto was renovated and expanded, when the new Keskiputous power plant was built on Tammerkoski and the riverbed was narrowed. Land exposed by the narrowed riverbed was used to build a broader coast promenade. The old edge of the coast was located approximately in the middle of the current park.

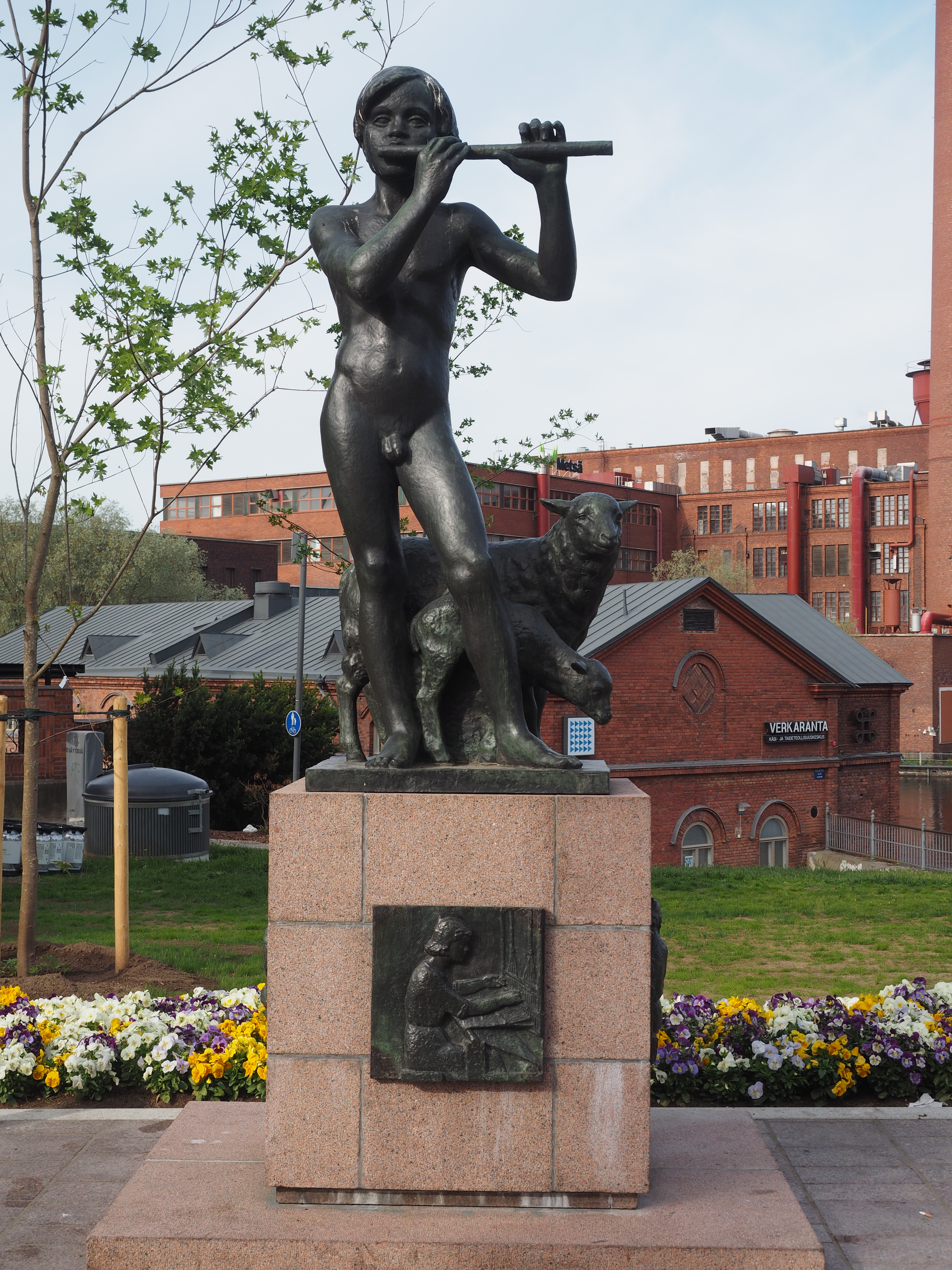
The sculpture "The Shepherd" by Yrjö Liipola is located in Koskipuisto.

In 1971 the sculpture Virvatulet (meaning "wills-o'-the-wisp") by sculptor Aimo Tukiainen, dedicated to Finnish soldiers, was unveiled at the park. The park had previously hosted Yrjö Liipola's 1947 sculpture Paimenpoika ("the shepherd"), which was now moved to Verkatehtaanpuisto.

In the early 1990s the play area of the park was renovated and named as the Pikku Kakkonen play park.
