= Pyynikki =

City district in Tampere, Finland

Coordinates: 61.496156°N 23.732496°E

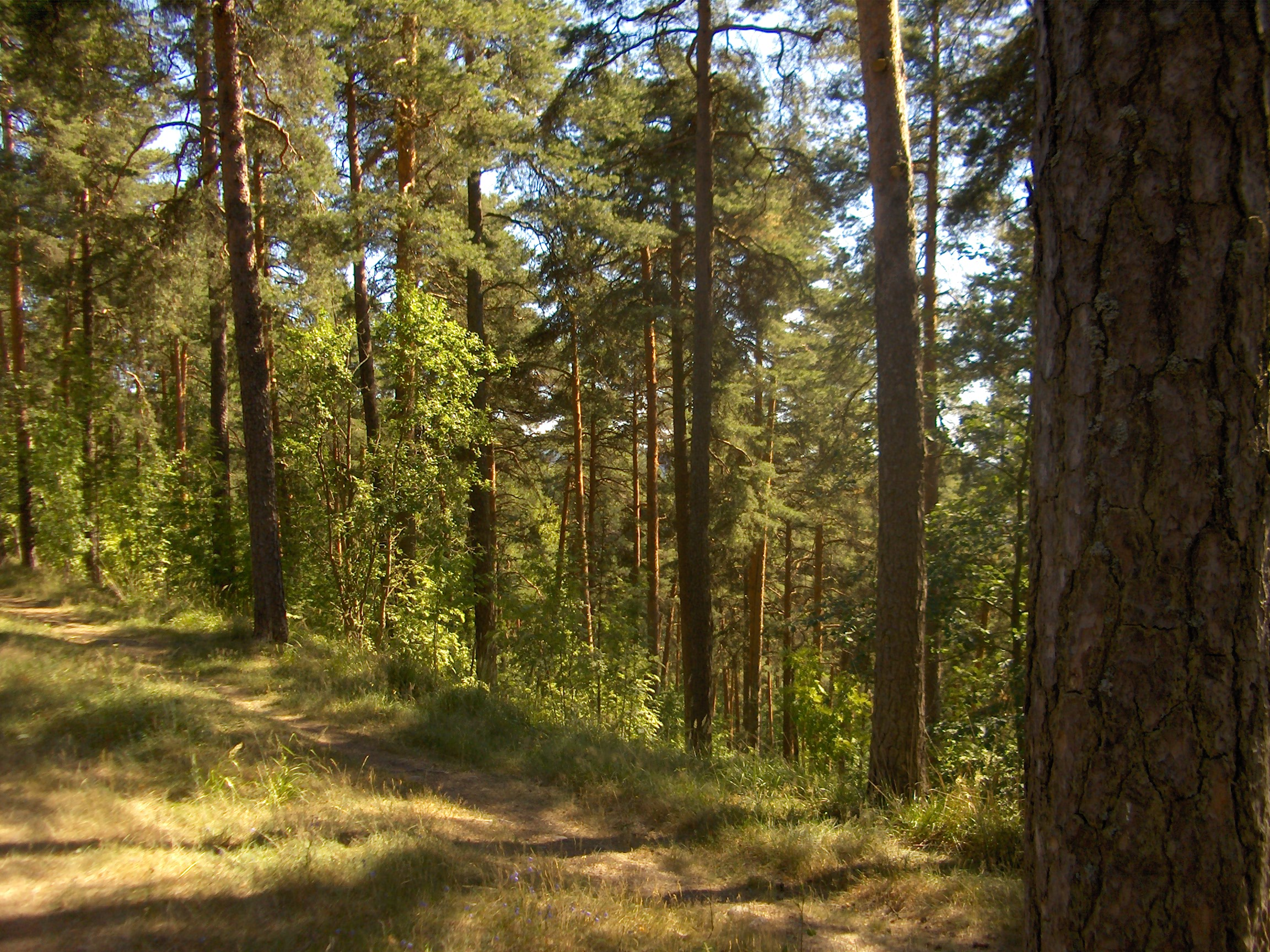
Hiking path in the slopes of Pyynikinharju ridge.

Pyynikki (Swedish: Pynike) is a district and a nature reserve in Tampere, Finland. It is located in the Pyynikinharju ridge, between the city center and the western district of Pispala. Pyynikinharju is the highest esker in the world, rising 85 meters above the level of lake Pyhäjärvi.

Tampere Circuit was a motorsport race track which ran on public streets of Pyynikki. In 1962 and 1963, the Finnish motorcycle Grand Prix on Tampere Circuit was a race of the Road Racing World Championship.

== Notable sights ==
- Pyynikki Esker
- Pyynikki observation tower
- Pyynikki Summer Theatre
- Viikinsaari Island
