= Matti Merivirta =

Finnish cleric and politician (1866–1944)

Matti Merivirta

Matti Merivirta (born Mathias Sjöström; 1866–1944) was a Finnish Lutheran clergyman and politician, born in Pori on 21 October 1866. He was a member of the Parliament of Finland from 1907 to 1908, representing the Christian Workers' Union of Finland (SKrTL). He died on 7 September 1944.
