= Mikhail Svechnikov =

Russian military officer

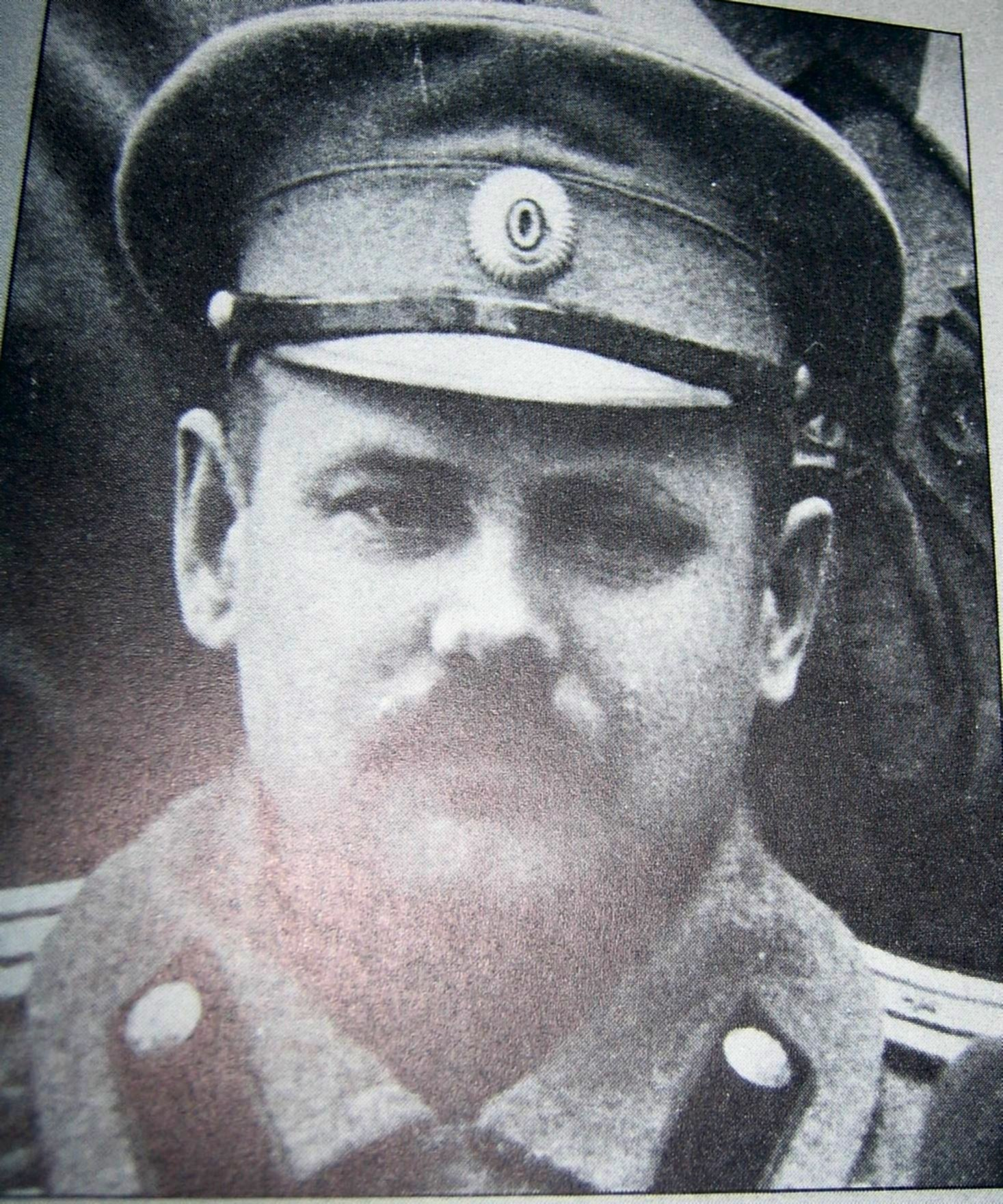
- Svechnikov in 1917
- Born: Mikhail Stepanovich Svechnikov; 30 September 1882; Ust-Medveditskaya, Russian Empire
- Died: 26 August 1938 (aged 55); Kommunarka shooting ground, Moscow, Soviet Union
- Burial place: Kommunarka shooting ground
- Military career
- Allegiance: Russian Empire; Red Finland; Soviet Russia; Soviet Union
- Branch: Imperial Russian Army; Red Guards; Red Army
- Service years: 1901–1937
- Rank: Colonel (Russian Army); Kombrig (Red Army)
- Conflicts: Boxer Rebellion; Russo-Japanese War; First World War; October Revolution; Finnish Civil War; Russian Civil War

Mikhail Stepanovich Svechnikov (Russian: Михаил Степанович Свечников; 30 September 1882 – 26 August 1938) was a Russian military officer in the Imperial Russian Army and the Red Army. He is best known as one of the military leaders of the Red Guards during the Finnish Civil War.

== Career ==
After his service in the Imperial Russian Army, Svechnikov took part at the 1917 October Revolution. During the 1918 Finnish Civil War he worked as a military advisor for the Red Guards. In February 1918, Svechnikov was shortly the Commander-in-Chief of the Northern Front, replaced then by Hugo Salmela. He was the highest ranked Russian officer who joined the Finnish Red Guards.

As the Finnish Civil War was over, Svechnikov fought in the Russian Civil War, in which he led the Caspian-Caucasian Front in the unsuccessful Northern Caucasus Operation (1918–1919).

Since 1922 he worked as a military lecturer. In 1934 Svechnikov was transferred to the Frunze Military Academy. He was arrested in 1937, accused on "Fascist conspiracy", and later executed at the Kommunarka shooting ground in Moscow. Svechnikov was rehabilitated after Stalin's death in 1956.
