= Suomenlinna prison camp =

Finnish concentration camp

Coordinates: 60°08′37″N 24°59′04″E

- Concentration camp
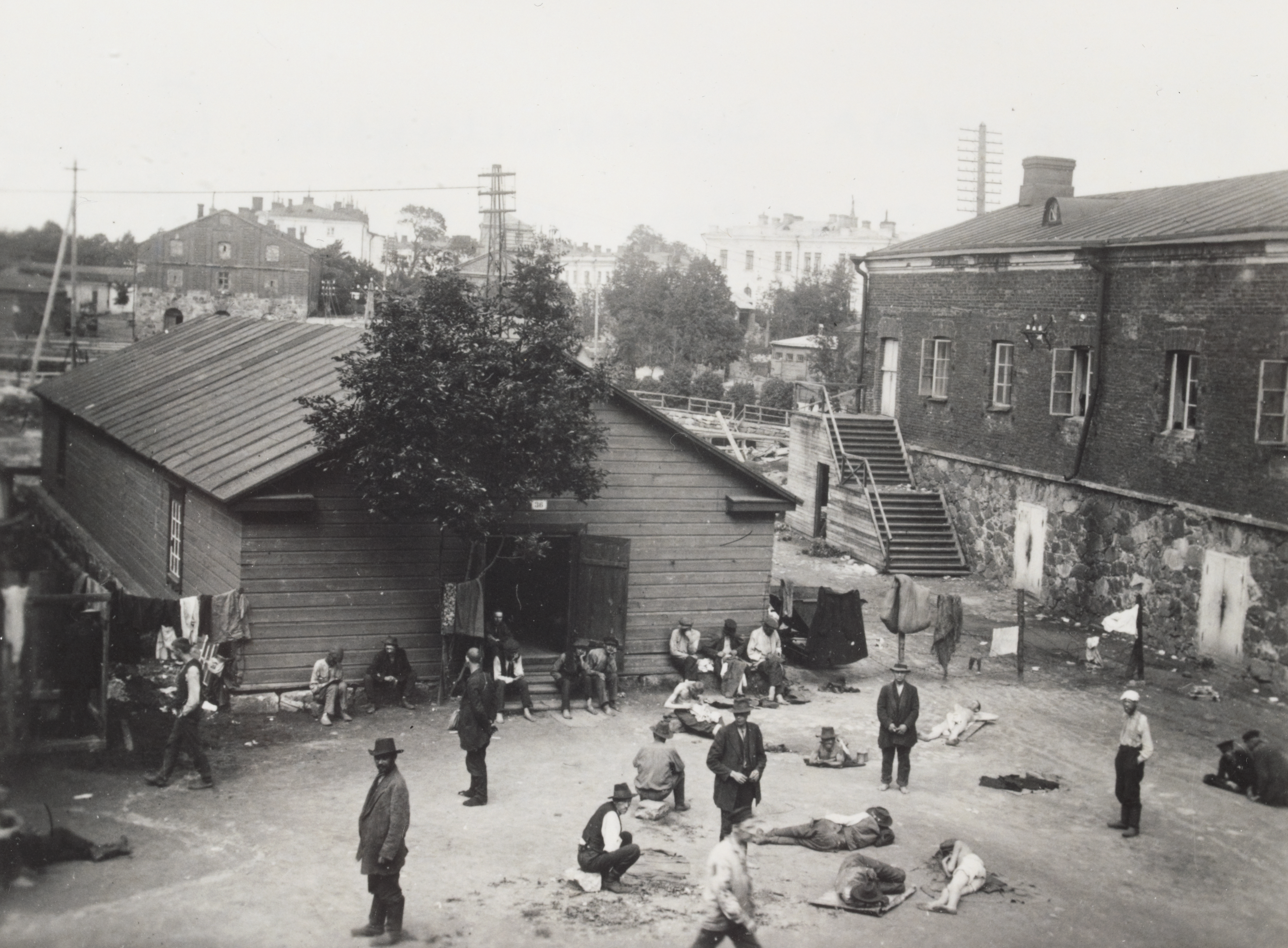
- Location: Suomenlinna, Helsinki, Finland
- Operated by: Government of Finland
- Operational: 12 April 1918 – 14 March 1919
- Inmates: Reds
- Number of inmates: c. 10,000
- Killed: c. 1,100

Suomenlinna prison camp (Finnish: Suomenlinnan vankileiri, Swedish: Sveaborgs fångläger) was a 1918 Civil War of Finland concentration camp in the Suomenlinna Fortress, Helsinki. It was established by the White Army for the Red Guard fighters taken prisoner after the Battle of Helsinki. The camp operated from April 1918 to March 1919. It was a subcamp for the Helsinki prison camp, which included the camps of Suomenlinna, Santahamina, Katajanokka and Isosaari.

== History ==
The camp was established in April 1918 after the Battle of Helsinki as the German troops captured thousands of Red Guard fighters and suspected Reds. Suomenlinna camp was at its largest in June 1918, when the number of prisoners was 8,000. Total number of inmates was approximately 10,000.

Suomenlinna camp was divided into six districts located at the islands of Pikku-Musta (I), Länsi-Musta (II), Iso Mustasaari (III, V) and Susisaari (IV, VI). In August, a seventh district was formed of the female Reds who were transported from the Santahamina camp.

On 15 September 1918 most of the prisoners were released due to a general pardon and the camp's status was changed into a forced labor camp ran by the Criminal Sanctions Agency. Number of inmates was about 1,000 until the camp was closed on 14 March 1919 and the remaining prisoners were released or taken to the Tammisaari labor camp.

Notable prisoners include Toivo Aronen, Ivar Lassy, Fiina Pietikäinen, Taavi Tainio and Sulo Wuolijoki. The writer Algot Untola was killed while transported to Suomenlinna.

== Casualties ==
Approximately 1,100 prisoners died of disease, hunger and executions. They were buried to a mass grave on the nearby Santahamina island. Death toll was the fifth largest among the Finnish Civil War prison camps.

== Memory ==
In 2004, a memorial by the environmental artist Marja Kanervo was unveiled in the Iso-Mustasaari island. A memorial erected in 1949 by the sculptor Uuno F. Inkinen stands on the Santahamina mass grave.
