= Finnish Civil War prison camps =

Prisons operated by the White Finns to hold POWs

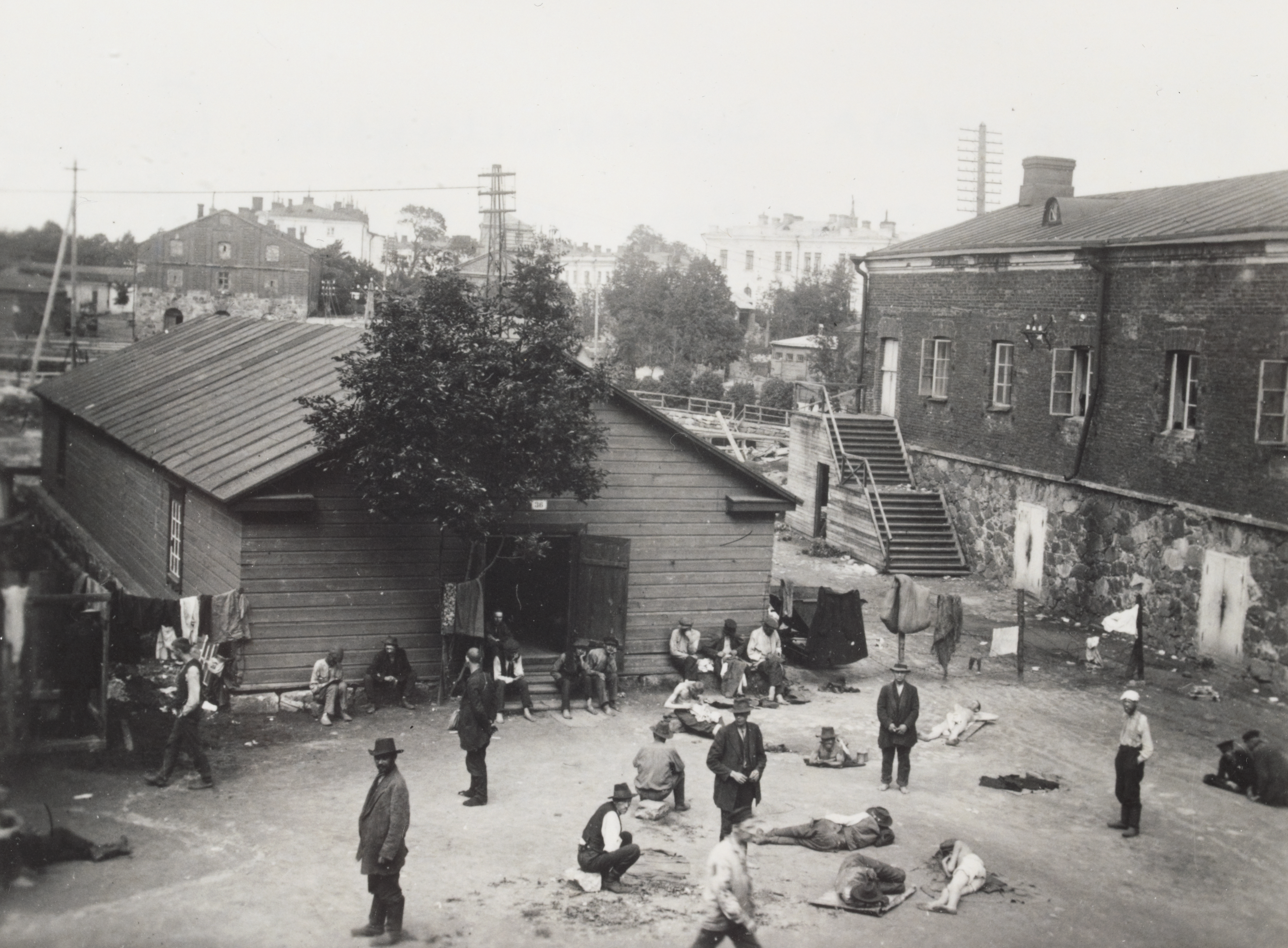
Prisoners of the Suomenlinna fortress in Helsinki

Finnish Civil War prison camps were operated by the White Finns to hold prisoners of war during and after the Finnish Civil War in 1918.

Around 80,000 captured Red Guards and their families, including 4,700 women and 1,500 children, were held in prisoner of war camps across Finland. They were composed of 13 main camps and more than 60 smaller sub-camps operated by the White Army during the summer of 1918. Conditions were very poor and camps suffered from high mortality rates – a total of 12,000 to 14,000 prisoners died in captivity due to malnutrition, disease and execution. The Finnish government took control of the camps in September with most prisoners being released by late 1918 and the camps were officially closed in 1921. The camps affected the minds of many Finnish people much more deeply than the war itself and influenced post-war politics in Finland. Conditions at the camps were totally ignored for decades by the White interpretation of the history of the Civil War, with the Finnish government paying reparations to former prisoners in 1973.

== Establishment ==
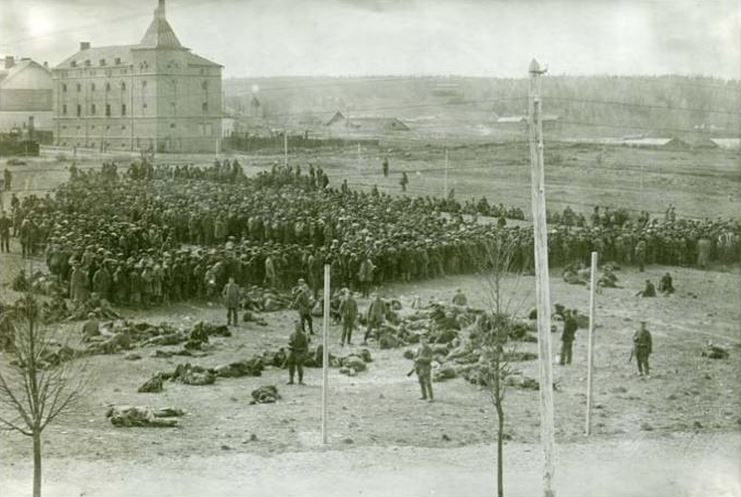
Hennala prison camp in Lahti.

The first prisoner of war camps of the Finnish Civil War were established at the beginning of the war in January 1918, in White-controlled northern Finland. These camps were mainly to hold 5,000 soldiers of the Imperial Russian Army who had been stationed in Grand Duchy of Finland. They were hastily assembled and used public buildings such as prisons, schools, and churches to hold the prisoners. The Red Guards also established a number of small camps in southern Finland in a similar fashion. Around 500 White prisoners were held at Svenska lyceum i Helsingfors, a Swedish-language high school in Helsinki.

The frontline of the Finnish Civil War was largely static for the first two months, and few prisoners of war were taken by either side. By March, the Whites began to win a number of victories against the Reds and advanced into Red Finland. In late March, the number of Red prisoners was only 4,000 but after the Battle of Tampere on 5 April 1918, some 11,000 Reds fell into the hands of the Whites and the first large camp was established in the Kalevankangas district of Tampere. Before the battle, captured Reds had mostly been shot by the Whites, but after the collapse of Tampere the number of prisoners became too large to continue the executions.

In late April, as White victory was imminent, thousands of Red refugees (including fighters, officials, sympathizers and their families) headed east towards the border with Soviet Russia. More than 30,000 were captured by the White troops and the German Baltic Sea Division between the towns of Hämeenlinna and Lahti. Around 22,000 of them were held for a couple of weeks in a concentration camp founded at the Fellman mansion premises in Lahti. Women and children were mainly released, but 10,900 male refugees and Red Guard members were moved to the Hennala prison camp. Around 10,000 more prisoners were taken by the Whites after the major Battle of Viipuri.

Finally, as the war ended on 15 May, around 80,000 Reds were held in more than 60 small camps. During the next two months all prisoners were transferred to 13 main camps, located mostly in the southern parts of country.

== Executions and the Political Offence Court ==
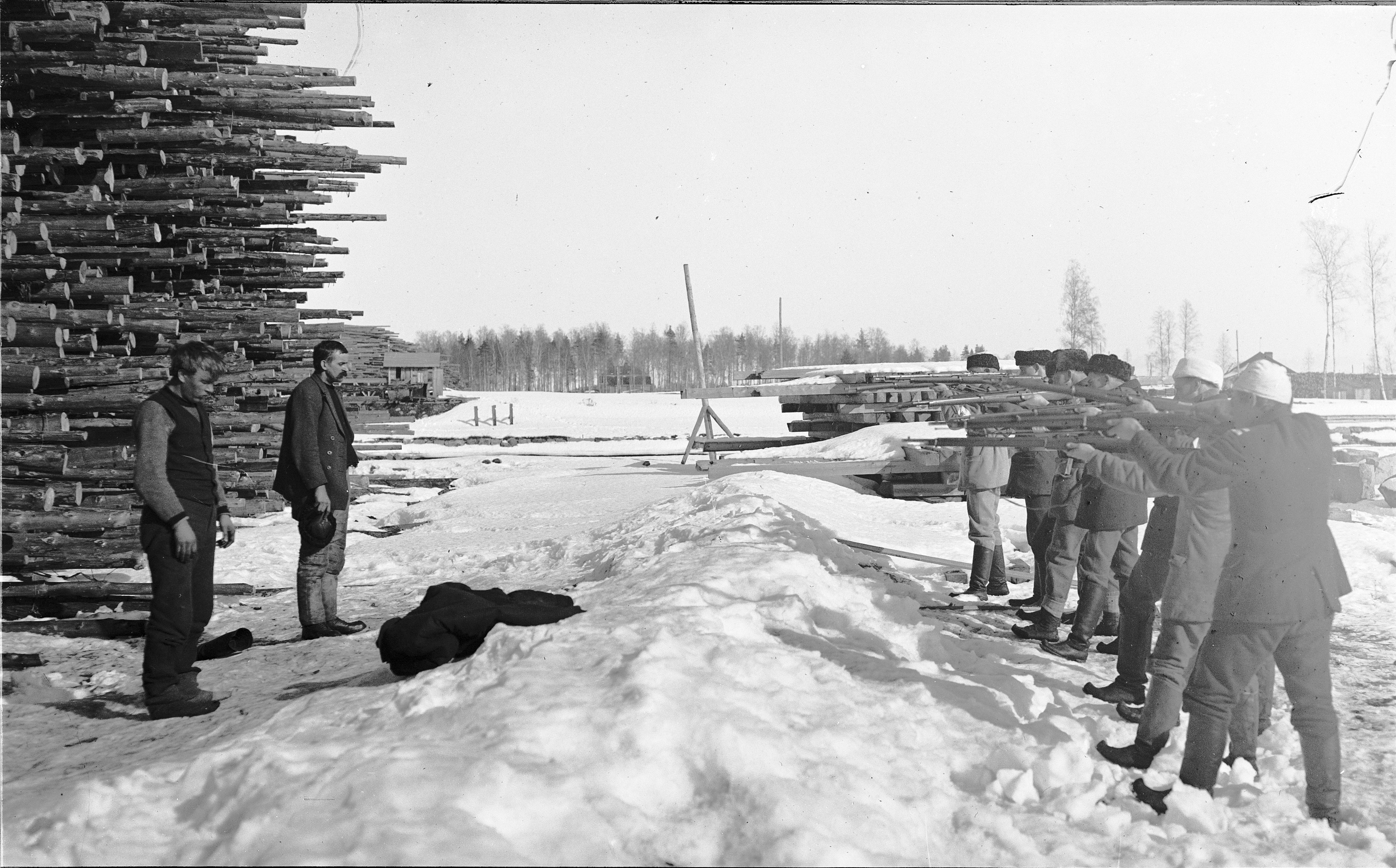
Two Red Guard members in front of a firing squad in Varkaus

Before the establishment of the Political Offence Court (Valtiorikosoikeus), more than 5,000 capitulated Reds were executed by the decisions of the local Courts-martial. The mass executions had started in February under the instructions given by the Commander-in-Chief Carl Gustaf Emil Mannerheim. Courts-martial divided the prisoners into three groups: The first group included Red Guard leaders and members of the Red administration as well as all Reds accused of war crimes like murders, arson and looting, who were mostly given death penalties. The second group consisted of all other Red Guard members and associates, who were given prison sentences. The third group was categorized as innocent and released.

Mass executions finally ceased by Mannerheim's order and the Political Offence Court was established in late May to process the Red prisoners. It was composed of 145 separate courts which handled more than 75,000 cases. The Senate made a decision to keep the prisoners detained until each person's guilt could be examined. Capital punishment was given for 555 Reds but only 113 were executed, as it was possible to plea for mercy. The Estonian-born Hans Kalm alone was responsible for more than 500 executions at the Hennala prison camp in Lahti. At least 200 of his victims were women and the youngest of them were only 14 years old. 104 of the 1,482 children held in prison camps died. Most of them died of starvation or disease but some 20 were executed, the youngest being only 9-year-old boy.

== Conditions ==
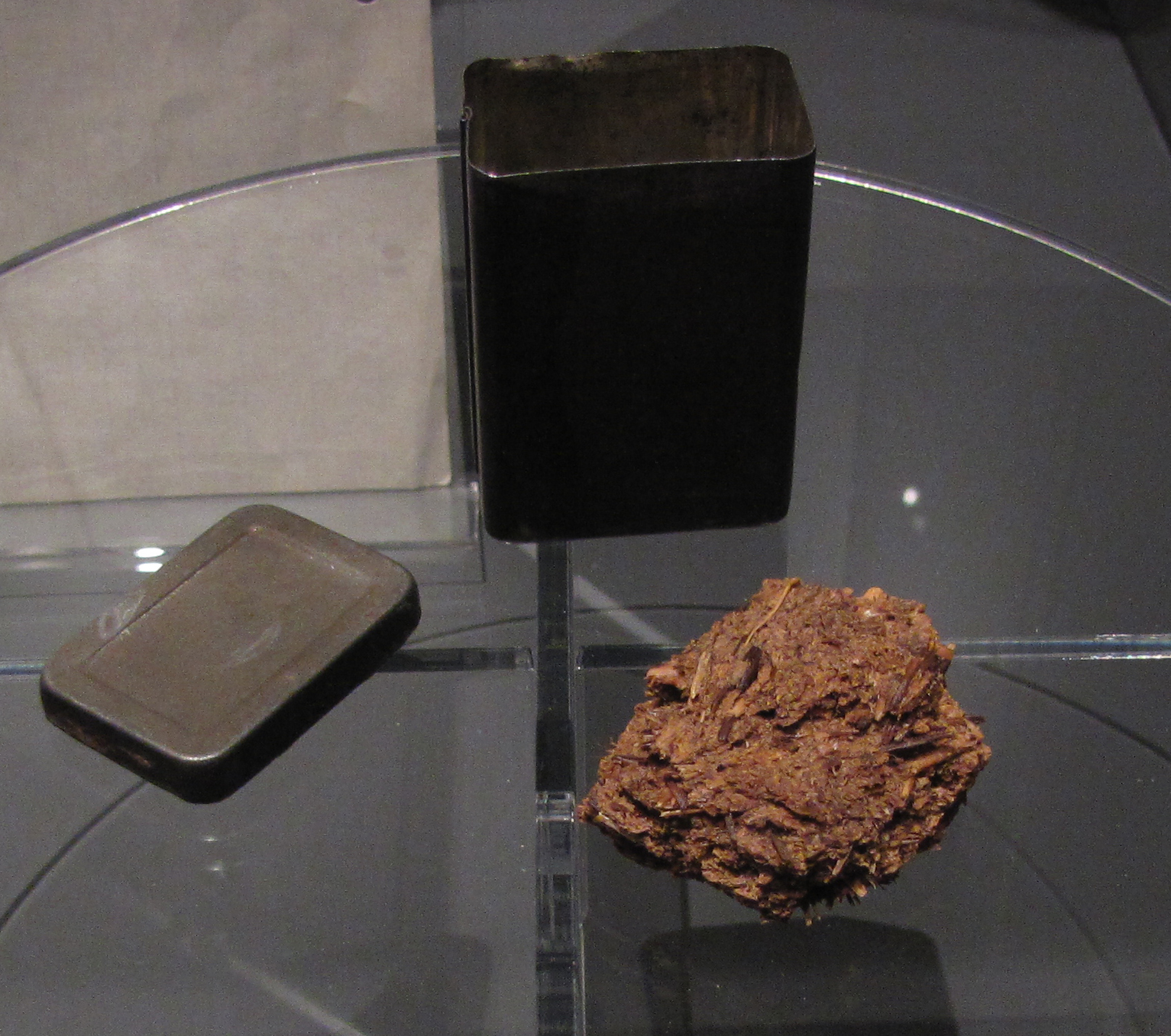
A piece of bread from the Hennala prison camp.

Conditions in the camps were terrible and mortality rates were particularly high, with average deaths per capita ranging from between 5% and 20% during their existence. The most infamous camp was Tammisaari in Ekenäs which, during the summer, an average of 30 prisoners died every day, making the total number of deceased up to 3,000 with a mortality rate of 34%.

The Civil War had greatly disrupted agriculture in Finland causing food shortages through the country. These shortages were particularly bad in the camps since there was no central administration for delivering supplies and prisoners were not allowed to receive deliveries from their families before the end of August. Many died from malnutrition and the quality of the food available in the camps was often extremely poor. Viljo Sohkanen, who was held at the Suomenlinna prison camp, described the conditions:

″Prisoners got a half a plate of soup, muddy water with a shred of cabbage, and some fat during the days and a small piece of bread with a stinky brown herring during the evenings. Soon we ate every plant we could find from the yard and the roots too. Some found angleworms and in Tampere, a half-rotten horse was eaten raw. One prisoner got sausage in a packet from home. He ate it all, but then threw it up in big pieces. Others immediately started eating the thrown-up sausage.″

General hygiene was abysmal and there were frequent outbreaks of various fatal diseases such as relapsing fever, pneumonia, dysentery and smallpox. The most lethal was the Spanish influenza which spread through Finland in July.

According to Kristen Ghodsee, poor conditions were exacerbated as the camps were mainly run by the White Army who had little-to-no sympathy for their prisoners. Guards and administrators held a revenge mentality, which meant they had no desire to improve conditions even if it was possible. Female prisoners were often brutally raped.

=== Awareness ===
In August, the Finnish medical scientist Robert Tigerstedt, who was chief physician of the Tammisaari camp, made a secret report of the prison camps. According to his report ″...such a death rate was never seen before and nothing like that could have happened even during the times of Czarist Russia.″ Tigerstedt's report was leaked to the Swedish press by Finnish Social Democrats and it soon spread to other Nordic countries and United Kingdom. It is assumed that the report negatively influenced the general attitude to acknowledge the Independence of Finland. A common rumor says that some foreign powers demanded Finland to improve the conditions of the prison camps or they would postpone their recognition of Finland's independence.

Another famous case was the businessman Hjalmar Linder, one of the wealthiest men in Finland. He made a visit to the Suomenlinna camp to see some of his employees and was shocked. Linder wrote a letter to the Swedish language newspaper Hufvudstadsbladet saying ″the Red Madness has turned into a White Terror as people are dropping dead like flies″. He insisted the prisoners should be released immediately and suggested that they should work a couple of years for their former employers as a forced labor. Linder's humane writings were deeply condemned by the Whites; he was seen as a Red associate, and soon the hatred became so hard that he had to flee the country.

== Closures ==
Conditions at the camps were becoming increasingly common knowledge and difficult to justify as time passed after the end of the Civil War. The Finnish government, who were struggling to process the large number of cases against prisoners, were under pressure to resolve the issue as quickly as possible.

In September, management of the camps was transferred from the White Army to the government State Correctional Office. At the same time, nearly 40,000 prisoners were released on parole, and in October, 10,000 more were pardoned. In late 1918, five camps were closed. At the end of 1919, the number of prisoners was 4,000, and 3,000 were pardoned in January 1920. The remaining Civil War camps functioned as labor camps until they were officially closed in 1921. The last 100 Red prisoners were transferred to Tammisaari camp, with the last 50 Reds being released in 1927. Tammisaari was turned into a penitentiary for political prisoners until it was finally closed in 1940. In 1973, the Finnish government paid reparations to 11,600 persons imprisoned in the camps after the civil war.

== List of the main camps ==
The number of prisoners is based on the book ″Vankileirit Suomessa 1918″ (1971) by the historian Jaakko Paavolainen. Casualties are based on the War Victims of Finland 1914–1922 Internet Database unless otherwise cited.

Camp	Location	Number of prisoners	Casualties	Note
Tammisaari prison camp	Dragsvik, Ekenäs	8,689	2,997	a labor camp for political prisoners until 1940
Hämeenlinna prison camp	Hämeenlinna	11,482	2,464	
Tampere prison camp	Tampere	ca. 10,000	ca. 1,400	a labor camp until early 1919
Hennala prison camp	Lahti	ca. 10,900	1,187	a labor camp until October 1919
Suomenlinna prison camp	Suomenlinna, Helsinki	ca. 10,000	ca. 1,400	a sub-camp for Helsinki Prison Camp, a labor camp until 14 March 1919
Riihimäki prison camp	Riihimäki	8,495	981	a labor camp until 1921
Vyborg prison camp	Vyborg	10,350	834	consisted of four sub-camps
Lappeenranta prison camp	Lappeenranta	ca. 3,000	692	
Kuopio prison camp	Kuopio	2,639	476	
Isosaari prison camp	Isosaari, Helsinki		ca. 340	a sub-camp for Helsinki Prison Camp
Turku prison camp	Turku	3,300	176	a labor camp until July 1919
Oulu prison camp	Oulu	2,100^{1}	49	
Vaasa prison camp	Vaasa	924	15	
Santahamina prison camp	Santahamina, Helsinki	ca. 3,000^{2}	13	a sub-camp for Helsinki Prison Camp
Mikkeli prison camp	Mikkeli	778	11	
Katajanokka prison camp	Katajanokka, Helsinki			a sub-camp for Helsinki Prison Camp

^{1} ca. 1,000 Russian soldiers until July 1918
^{2} ca. 2,000 male prisoners (April–May 1918), ca. 1,000 female prisoners (June–September 1918)

== Sources ==
- Tepora, Tuomas & Roselius, Aapo: The Finnish Civil War 1918: History, Memory, Legacy. Brill Academic Publishers 2014. ISBN 978-900-42436-6-8. Google Books
