= Fredrik Edvard Johansson =

Commander during the Finnish Civil War (1871–1918)

Fredrik Edvard Johansson (28 April 1871 – 21 May 1918) was a Finnish violinist who served as the commander of the Helsinki Red Guard's I Regiment during the Finnish Civil War. The Helsinki Red Guard had no official commander at all when the war began, so Johansson effectively assumed this role for the duration of the war.

Johansson was one of the Reds' commanders in the Battle of Sigurds in late February 1918. He was also the real leader of Helsinki's defence after the Finnish People's Delegation fled Vyborg in early April 1918 from the approaching Baltic Sea Division. On 9-11 April, Johansson, together with Edvard Nyqvist, chief of militia, and Työväentalo commissar Robert Hurskainen, tried several times to get Helsinki either evacuated or to surrender, but the People's Delegation ordered the Helsinki Red Guards to defend the city. Johansson was captured by the Germans after the Battle of Helsinki on 12-13 April.

Johansson was a white prisoner in Sörnäinen Prison until he was shot without trial in Santahamina on 21 May 1918, together with ten other Reds. The execution was personally presided over by the Helsinki commandant, Major General Gösta Theslöf, who probably also ordered it. The writer Algot Untola was also on the same transport, but was shot on the way to the sea after he tried to escape. Johansson was declared dead in 1952, the official date of death being 1 January 1922.

== Sources ==
- Jarmo Nieminen (ed.): Helsinki ensimmäisessä maailmansodassa – sotasurmat 1917–1918. Gummerus, Helsinki 2015. ISBN 9789512400867
