= Battle of Helsinki =

1918 battle of the Finnish Civil War

- Part of the Finnish Civil War in the Eastern Front of World War I
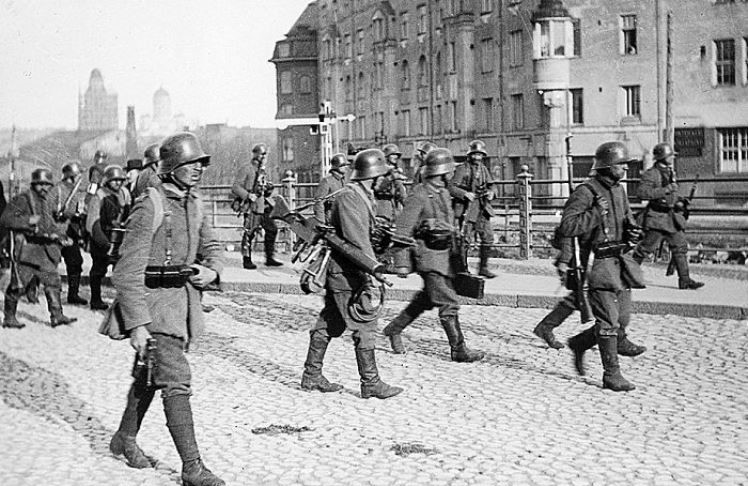
- German troops in the Kamppi district
Date	12–13 April 1918 (1 day)
Location	Helsinki, Finland
Result	German and White victory

Belligerents
German Empire; Finnish Whites	Finnish Reds

Commanders and leaders
(German Empire) Rüdiger von der Goltz (German Empire) Hugo Meurer; Carl Voss-Schrader	Fredrik Johansson (POW) (executed); Edvard Nyqvist (POW)

Units involved
(German Empire) Baltic Sea Division (German Empire) German Navy; Helsinki White Guard	Helsinki Red Guard

Strength
6,000 Germans; 2,000 Whites	1,500–2,000 in the combat units

Casualties and losses
54 Germans killed 23 Whites killed	c. 400 killed or executed 4,000–6,000 captured 4,400-6,400 total

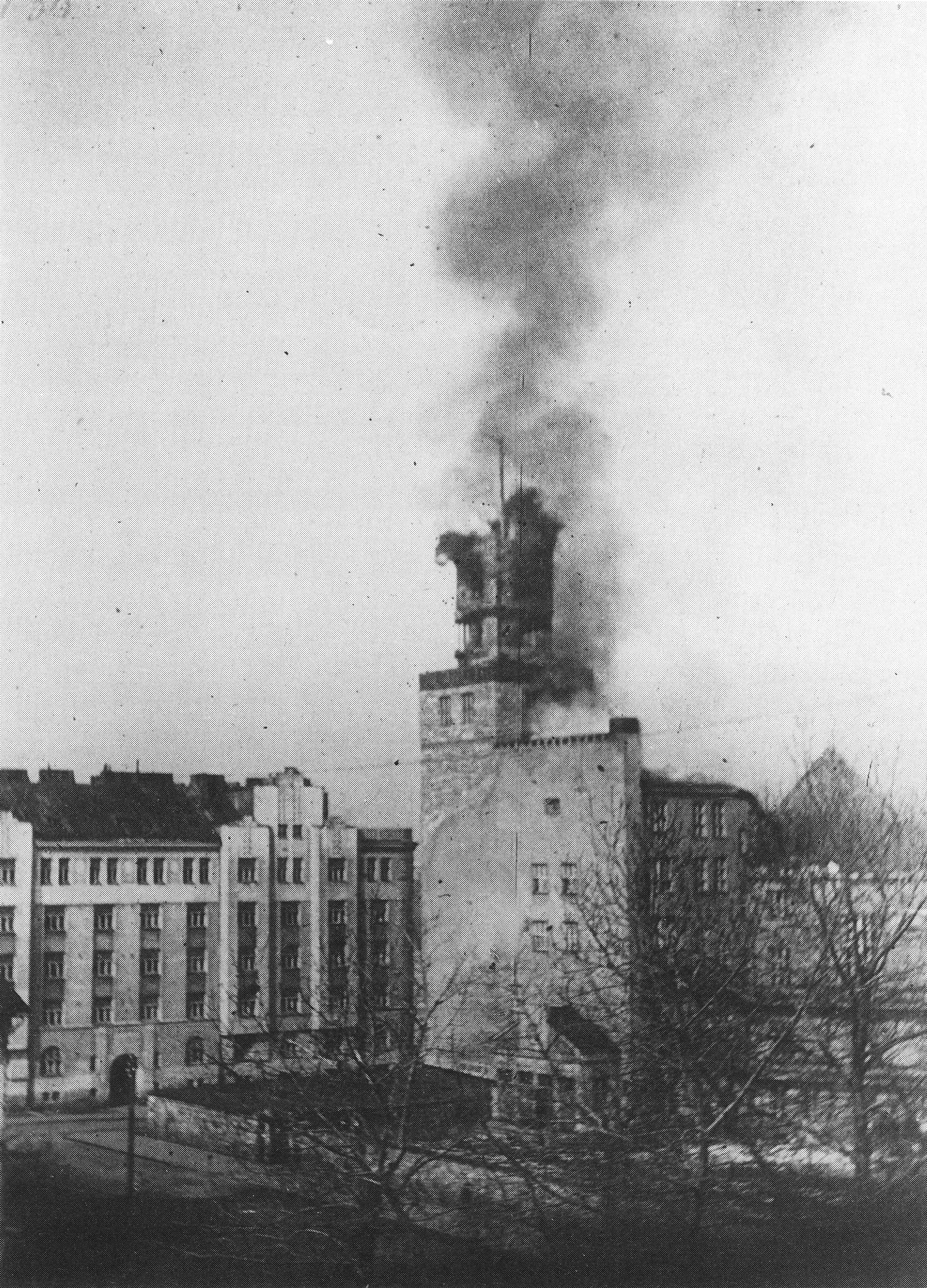
The Worker's House on fire

The Battle of Helsinki was a 1918 Finnish Civil War battle, fought on 12–13 April by the German troops and Finnish Whites against the Finnish Reds in Helsinki, Finland. Together with the battles of Tampere and Vyborg, it was one of the three major urban battles of the Finnish Civil War. The Germans invaded Helsinki despite the opposition of Finnish White Army leader Carl Gustaf Emil Mannerheim who wanted to attack the capital city with his own troops after Tampere had fallen on 6 April. However, the Germans had their own interest in taking Helsinki as quickly as possible and then moving further east towards the Russian border. The city had been under Red control for 11 weeks since the beginning of the war.

The German Baltic Sea Division landed in Finland on 3 April and entered the Helsinki area eight days later. In the city centre, the defending Reds did not have defensive lines or barricades but were fighting inside single buildings and blocks, which the Germans then had to take one by one. During the battle, life in Helsinki went on as usual. The shops and restaurants were open, the public transportation functioned and factories were running. Curious spectators were wandering so close that the Germans had to tell them to move back. The White supporters considered the Germans liberators and handed them flowers as well as tea, coffee and snacks to eat.

Nearly 500 people were killed in the battle. The number includes about 400 Red Guard fighters who were killed in action or executed after capitulation, 54 Germans and 23 White Guard members. The number of executed Reds is unclear, but it is estimated between 20 and 50. After the battle, from 4,000 to 6,000 Red Guard members or supporters were arrested.

== The units ==
The 10,000-men-strong Baltic Sea Division attacked Helsinki with 6,000 men including two infantry regiments, one jäger battalion, an artillery battery and some supportive troops. The Imperial German Navy landed 400 Matrosen to the Katajanokka district, where they entered the downtown and joined the Baltic Division. The Germans were supported by 2,000 Helsinki White Guard members, who had been active underground during the Red control of the city. However, the Whites did not have any important role as they joined the battle in its late stage.

The Red Guard units defending Helsinki were mainly composed of inexperienced reserves. At the time, the main combat forces of the Helsinki Red Guard were fighting on the Tavastia Front. They were led by the bricklayer Edvard Nyqvist, who had served as the city's militia chief, and the industrial worker Fredrik Edvard Johansson because the Red Guard general staff, as well as the Red Government, had left Helsinki on 8 April and fled to the city of Vyborg in Eastern Finland. There were still some Red supporting Russian troops in town, but under the Treaty of Brest-Litovsk, signed between the Soviet Russia and the Central Powers, they did not take part in the battle.

== Battle outside Helsinki ==
The Baltic Sea Division landed at Hanko, 120 kilometres west of Helsinki, on 3 April and started marching east. The first battle between German troops and the Finnish Reds was fought three days later in the town of Karis. The Germans lost nine men but took over this important railway junction, then closing Helsinki by the Coastal Railway and the Turku–Helsinki highway. After minor skirmishes in Lohja and Kirkkonummi, the Germans finally entered foregrounds of the Krepost Sveaborg, a Russian-built system of fortifications around Helsinki, in the Leppävaara village of Espoo, 10 kilometres west of Helsinki. The Battle of Leppävaara was fought on 11 April. The Germans attacked the Red defensive posts, and managed to force them to flee. Red Guard's losses were 13 men while the Germans had only two men killed in action. As the Reds retreated, the Germans had an open road towards the suburbs of Helsinki.

On the next morning, general Rüdiger von der Goltz ordered a group of 500 men to attack Tikkurila, 16 kilometres north of Helsinki, in order to cut the Helsinki–Riihimäki railway and close the way out of the city. The Germans fought against local Red Guard members who defended from their own houses and yards with some support of an armoured train. The Baltic Sea Division finally took the Tikkurila railway station at 5 PM and soon entered the Malmi railway station, 3 kilometres south of Tikkurila. The poorly equipped Reds had at least 25 men killed in Tikkurila, according to some sources even 100, but the Germans lost only two.

== Attack on the city ==
=== Battle in the suburbs ===
The Baltic Sea Division entered the northern suburbs of Pikku Huopalahti and Meilahti in the early morning of 12 April. Troops marched towards the downtown via the Turku Highway, which today is known as Mannerheimintie, the main street of Helsinki. The first clashes were fought around 6 AM in the rocky hills of Tilkka, which the Germans took three hours later. The next defensive line was only a half kilometre ahead. As the Germans broke through the second line around 10 AM, the Reds attacked their left flank from the Pasila area. After two hours of fighting, the Germans pushed the Reds back and took the Pasila railway station, located three kilometres north of the Helsinki railway station. Now they were finally able to enter the city.

=== Battle in the city ===
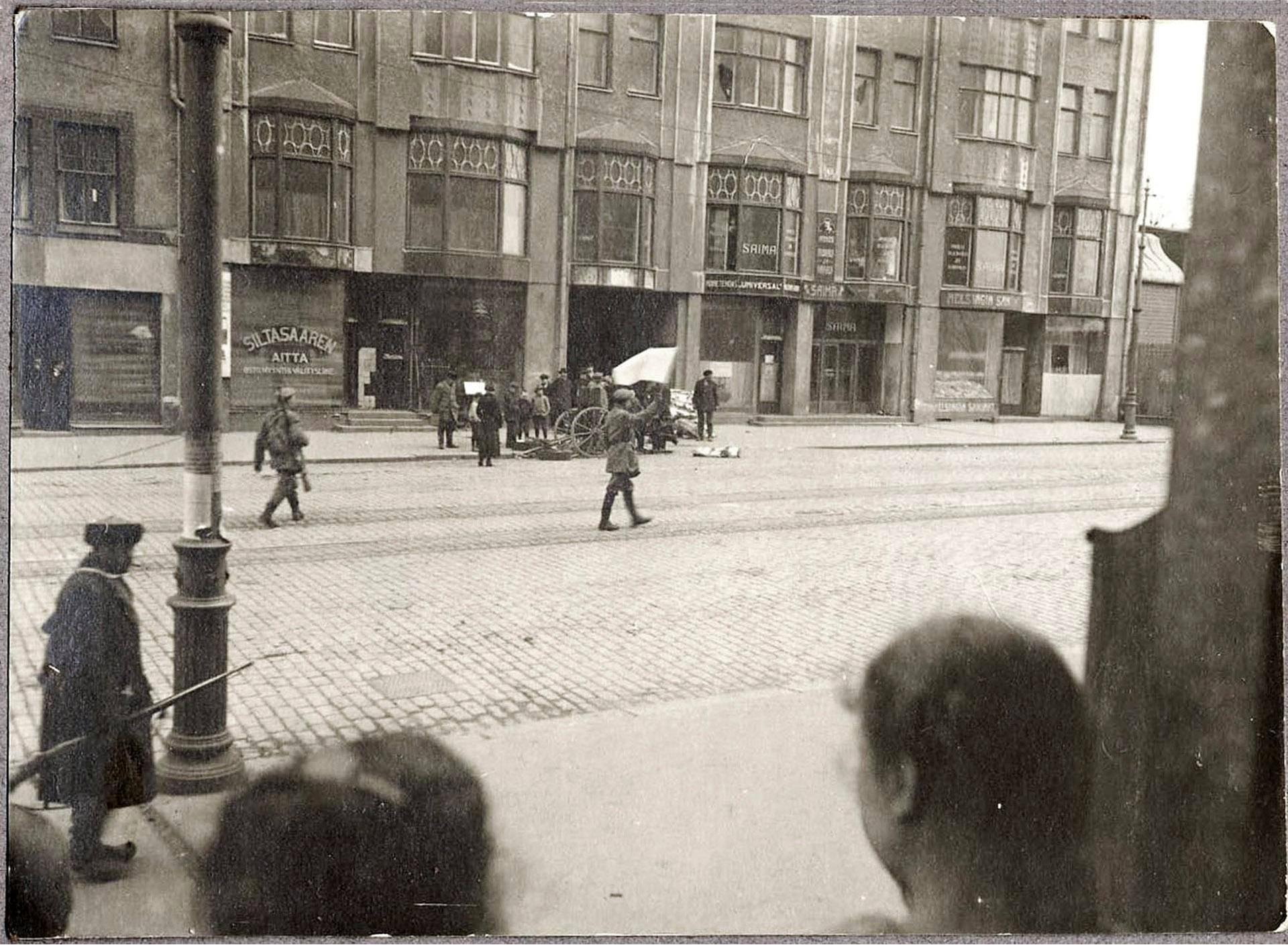
A Red fighter waving a white flag

At 1.30 PM the Germans reached the Töölö district. As the Reds managed to stop the invading troops, the German Colonel Hans von Tschirschky und Bögendorff formed two units. One unit continued the attack along the Mannerheimintie as the other one evaded through the Hietalahti district to the southern parts of the city. At the same time, a third squad was entering the city from Pasila along the railway. By the National Museum the Germans were hit by heavy fire around 4 PM. The shooting came from the Turku Garrison, which was located near the present-day Lasipalatsi building. Germans now had to evade the Turku Garrison from west along the street Fredrikinkatu of the Kamppi district. The garrison was later taken over by setting the building on fire.

At 5.30 PM the Germans reached the Erottaja square where they took the Swedish Theatre by using capitulated Reds as human shields. Another known case where the Germans used human shield was later in the same evening as they marched over the Pitkäsilta bridge behind 300 capitulated Reds. According to a German officer, interviewed by a Finnish journalist, they had learnt the method from the British. At this time, there was also hard fighting at the Helsinki Railway Station as well as in the nearby Kluuvi district. A squad of German Navy Marines landed Katajanokka at 7 PM and soon entered the Kruununhaka district.

On the next morning the Germans attacked the Red Guard headquarters at the Smolna building in Kaartinkaupunki area. The 400–500 Reds of the Smolna finally capitulated at 7 AM. The last fighting Reds were now at the northern worker districts of Kallio and Hakaniemi, where heavy artillery fire was aimed. Among other buildings, the Workers' House was hit and damaged severely. Finally at 2 PM, a white flag was raised on the tower of the Kallio Church and the battle was over.

=== After the conquest ===
After losing Helsinki, the Red Defense Command moved to Riihimäki (which also involved the Battle of Hyvinkää), where it was headed by painter and congressman Efraim Kronqvist. The Germans troops, on the other hand, attacked Helsinki north on 15 April and conquered Klaukkala four days later, continuing from there to Hämeenlinna. At the same time in Loviisa, the German Detachment Brandenstein proceeded from Eastern Uusimaa to Lahti where the Reds fled from the Helsinki region also ended up. Helsinki and Finland remained under German occupation until the fall of Emperor William II and the end of the First World War. Rüdiger von der Goltz was the official representative of the country in Finland, initially staying at Hotel Kämp and then at Kesäranta.

== Aftermath and commemoration ==
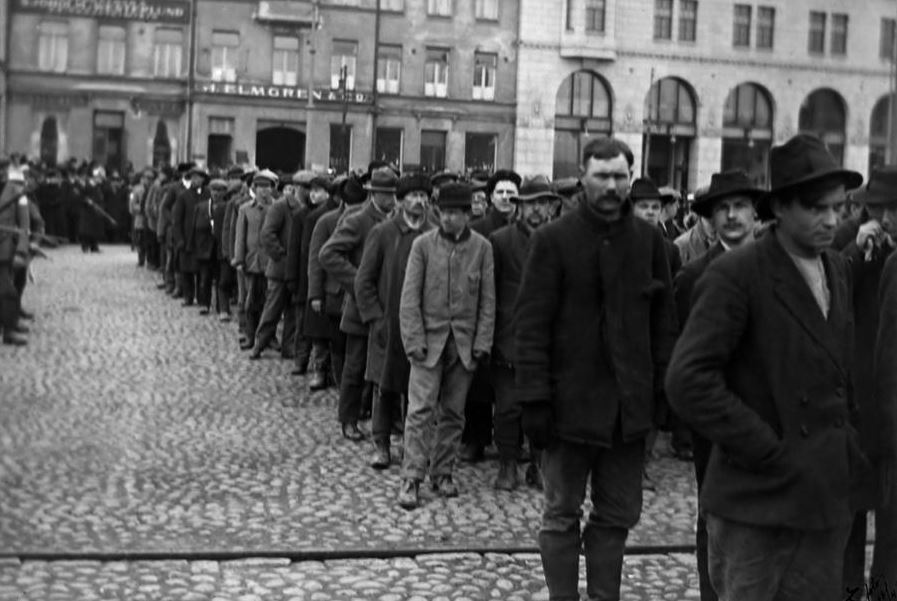
Captured Reds

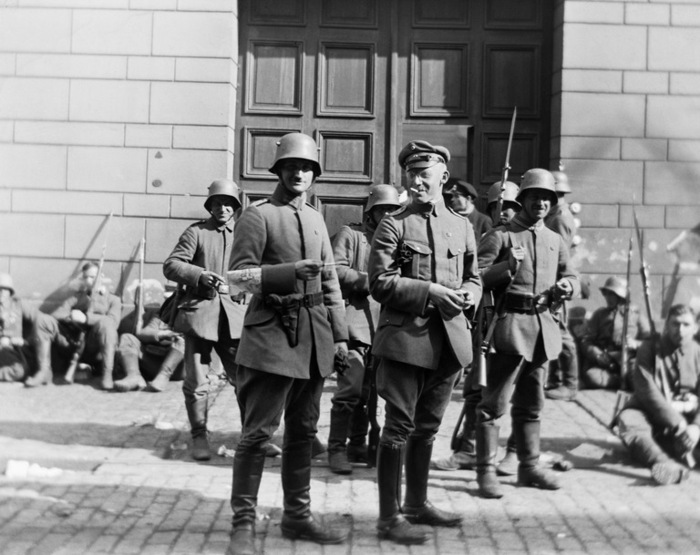
Officers of the Baltic Sea Division in front of the Smolna building after their troops had taken the Red Guard headquarters in Helsinki.

After the battle, 4,000–6,000 Red Guard supporters were arrested and transferred to the Helsinki Prison Camp in the Suomenlinna islands. Over the course of the battle, more than 10,000 Reds and their families fled the Helsinki area. Most of them were captured during the aftermath of the Battle of Lahti as tens of thousands of Red refugees fell into the hands of Germans and Whites. Contrary to the fate that befell the cities of Tampere and Vyborg, there were not mass executions in Helsinki. That was most likely because of the Germans who prevented Whites from killing their prisoners. However, in the summer of 1918, more than 1,400 Red prisoners died at the Helsinki Prison Camp as a result of executions, hunger and disease.

The German commander, Rüdiger von der Goltz, decided to have a victory parade on Sunday 14 April, a day after the battle was over. It was held at the Senate Square, where von der Goltz was hailed by the mayor Johannes von Haartman and the governor Bruno Jalander. During the parade, there was still some shooting around the city by single Red Guard gunmen. The German fleet was also fired upon by various Russian ships. Even the Admiral Hugo Meurer's boat had to turn back and, as a result, was unable to participate in the parade.

The Germans and Finnish Whites who were killed in action were buried in the graveyard of the Helsinki Old Church. The German memorial was designed by the Finnish sculptors Gunnar Finne and J. S. Sirén and the White memorial by Elias Ilkka and Erik Bryggman. The Reds were laid to rest in the Malmi graveyard. Their memorial was placed in the Eläintarha park, but it was not unveiled until 1970. The monument is a work of the sculptor Taisto Martiskainen and includes verses of the poets Maiju Lassila, Elmer Diktonius and Elvi Sinervo

== See also ==
- Battle of Hyvinkää
- Battle of Lahti
- Battle of Tampere
- Battle of Ahvenkoski
- Battle of Vyborg
