= Ausfeld =

Ausfeld is a surname. Notable people with the surname include:

- Adolf Ausfeld (1855–1904), German philologist
- Eduard Ausfeld (1885–1946), German military officer
- Eduard Ausfeld (1850–1906), German archivist and historian
- Frederick Ausfeld (1860 - c. 1930), US-based, German-born architect
