= Ivar Lassy =

Finnish writer and anthropologist (1889–1938)

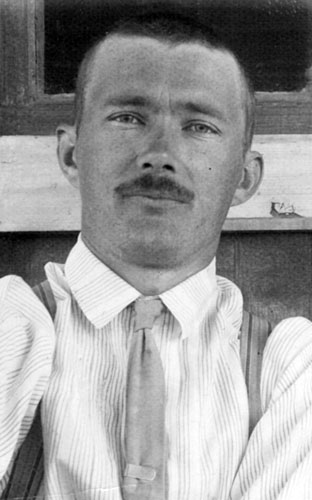
- Born: November 18, 1889; Baku, Russian Empire
- Died: June 4, 1938 (aged 48); Drozhzhino, Soviet Union
- Occupations: journalist, writer, athropologist, orientalist
- Notable work: The Muharram Mysteries Among the Azerbeijan Turks of Caucasia (1916)

Ivar Fredrik Lassy (18 November 1889 – 4 June 1938) was a Finnish writer and anthropologist who was active in the Socialist and Communist parties. Lassy moved to the Soviet Union in 1923 and was killed during the Great Purge.

Lassy was first a member of the Social Democratic Party but soon switched to the illegal Communist Party of Finland. The mainstream Social Democrats found him too radical, but his distinctive opininons did not please the Communists neither. In his research, Lassy studied the Turkic people of Caucasus and later the history of sexual ethics, although he was expelled from the academic circles for joining the Reds in the 1918 Civil War of Finland.

== Life ==
=== Early years ===
Lassy was born in Baku where his father worked as an oil ship captain for the Branobel company. At the age of ten, Lassy was sent to school to Finland. In 1909, Lassy entered the University of Helsinki where he studied aesthetics, philosophy, literature and economics earning his 1916 doctorate in Azerbaijanis folk tradition. The dissertation was based on his field work in Caucasus. In 1917, Lassy published the book Persiska mysterier (The Persian Mysteries), a popular version of his dissertation, and the travel book Bakom gallret och slöjan (Behind Bars and Vail).

Lassy's first language was Swedish. He spoke fluent Finnish and had learned Russian, German, English, French, Persian and Arabic. Lassy's early political views were influenced by philosophers like Rousseau. He also had some left-wing sympathies, although, he was not personally involved with socialists. During the World War I, the Finnish intellectuals were mostly pro-German, but Lassy was a member of a small group that supported the Entente.

=== Civil War and Politics ===
As the Civil War broke out in January 1918, Lassy offered his services for the Peoples Delegation and was hired as a translator by Yrjö Sirola. According to Lassy, he joined the Reds because he saw the worker's revolution as a subject on anthropological research, but was soon sucked into the aspect as he learned to understand their demands. After the Battle of Helsinki, Lassy was captured by the Whites and given a 9-year-sentence for treason but he was pardoned in November 1918. At the Suomenlinna prison camp, Lassy was introduced to socialism by his cellmates Sulo Wuolijoki and Taavi Tainio.

Lassy joined the Social Democratic Party and became active in its radical opposition. He worked as an editor for the journal Sosialistinen Aikakauslehti (The Socialist Journal) and helped running the communist smuggling route between Stockholm and Petrograd. In October 1919, Lassy helped the American journalist John Reed across the Russian border. In 1920, Lassy was sent to prison for nearly 2 years of his political activity. During his term at the Tammisaari labor camp, Lassy left the Social Democrats and joined the Socialist Workers Party, a front organization set up by the exiled Communist Party of Finland.

=== In the Soviet Union ===
In 1923, he moved to the Soviet Union. Lassy settled in Petrozavodsk where he worked as the People's Commissar for Education of the Karelian ASSR and the principal of the Party School. In 1928, Lassy was transferred to Moscow. He worked as a translator at the Komintern publishing company and the director of the Scandinavian section of the Communist University of the National Minorities of the West. In 1932–1935, Lassy was a scholar of Oriental languages at the Moscow State University. Since 1936, he worked at the Progress Publishers and was the director of the foreign department of the Glavlit.

Lassy's literal works include the 1931 Finnish book Marxismin perusteet (Foundations of Marxism) which was later declared as contrarevolutionary. He also translated to Swedish the first part of Stalin's Foundations of Leninism.

Lassy was arrested for espionage in February 1938. He was executed in June at the Butovo firing range.

== Private life ==
Lassy's first spouse was Ellen Alfhild Söderman, daughter of the businessman Karl Söderman.

== Selected works ==
- The Muharram Mysteries Among the Azerbaijan Turks of Caucasia (1916)
- Bakom gallret och slöjan (1917)
- Persiska mysterier (1917)
- Marxismin perusteet (1931)
- J. V. Stalin: Leninismens grundfrågor 1, translation by Ivar Lassy and Alice Rosenblad (1938)
