= Oskar Rantala =

Finnish soldier (1869–1918)

Oskar Rantala (1869–1918) was a Finnish soldier. He was the regimental commander of the Helsinki unit of the Finnish Red Guards, and he was also the commander of the Eastern front of the reds during the Finnish Civil War. At the end of the war, he led the defence of Vyborg during the Battle of Vyborg together with Edvard Gylling where he died.

Rantala was born in Tyrvää, and was a member of the Red Guards who were involved in the 1906 Sveaborg rebellion. According to a report by the White Army intelligence headquarters he was also a member the Revolutionary Tribunal.
