= Red Guard's March =

"The Red Guards' March" (Finnish: "Punakaartin Marssi") is a Finnish working class song. It is one of the best known songs of the "Reds" during the Finnish Civil War in 1918, but was actually sung already before the war. Even though the lyrics for the march were written in Finnish, the melody has been taken from two Swedish and German folk songs. The writer of the lyrics is unknown.

Original Finnish lyrics
English literal translation

Köyhä Suomen kansa
katkoo kahleitansa
kärsimysten malja se jo kukkuroillaan on.
Raakaa sortovaltaa vastaan
nostaa maasta armeijastaan
jalon Kansan parhaat pojat taistohon.

The poor Finnish people
is breaking its chains
the chalice of suffering is filled to the brim
Against the brutal oppression force
It lifts from the country, from its army
the best sons of the noble people to the battle.

Hallitus on vankka
kätyrlauma sankka
se kauhuntuskaa levittää yli onnettoman maan.
Urhojansa kansanvalta
työntää esiin kaikkialta
elämästä, kuolemasta kamppaillaan.

The government is robust
minion hordes numerous
it spreads terror anguish over the hapless land.
The democracy pushes its heroes
forth everywhere
we struggle of life, of death.

Virkavallan huolena
vankilat ja tuonela
tutkimatta hirttäminen, mestaus.
Kumouksen sankari
sydänveren antavi
kallis ompi vapauden lunastus.

As the concerns of the bureaucracy [are]
prisons and Tuonela
hanging without trial, execution.
Hero of the revolution
gives his heartblood
costly is the claiming of freedom.

Kiihtyy yhä taisto
vapauden vaisto
köyhälistön keskuudessa kasvaa vaan.
Eipä auta hallitusta
piinat kidutus ja tuska
urhot kaatuu vapauden laulu huulillaan.

The struggle still intensifies
the instinct of freedom
keeps on growing amongst the poor.
Torments torture and pain
won't help the government
heroes die with the song of freedom on their lips.

Kuinka kauan siellä
teurastusta viellä
kestää kunnes kansalla on vapaus.
Ei nyt taiston tuoksinassa
tiedä kumpi voittamassa
vallankumous vaiko taantumus

How long does go on
the slaughter there
before the people have freedom.
No one knows in the midst of battle
who is winning
revolution or reaction

Kumouksen myrskyt
kapinat ja tyrskyt
riehuu valtakunnan äärest äärehen.
Siellä hirmuhenget saavat
sydänverta janoavat
särpiellä hurmejuomat kanssa korppien.

The storms of the revolution
riots and outbreaks
rage from the end to end of the realm
There black spirits
thirsting heartblood
can slurp gore drinks with ravens.

Kylvömme kun tehdään
kasvaa kerran tähkään
sadoin kerroin kirkkahampi onnen aika uus.
Silloin Suomen kansanvalta
kiittää sankarpoikiansa
ilonkyyneleitä palkaks' saapi sankaruus.

When we do our sowings
will once grow
a new age of happiness, hundreds of times brighter.
Then the democracy of Finland
thanks its hero sons
heroism will be rewarded with tears of joy.
