= Fiina Pietikäinen =

Finnish politician

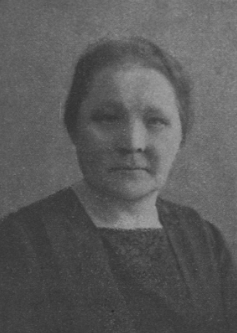
Fiina Pietikäinen in the early 1920's

Adolfina (Fiina) Sofia Pietikäinen (8 February 1870, Helsingin maalaiskunta – 12 February 1956, née Lindqvist) was a Finnish trade union activist and politician. She served as a Member of the Parliament of Finland from 1908 to 1909, representing the Social Democratic Party of Finland (SDP). She was imprisoned at the Suomenlinna prison camp in 1918 for having sided with the Reds during the Finnish Civil War. From 1929 to 1930, she was active in the short-lived Left Group of Finnish Workers.
