= Battle of Viipuri =

1918 battle of the Finnish Civil War

Coordinates: 60.706967°N 28.748952°E

- Part of the Finnish Civil War
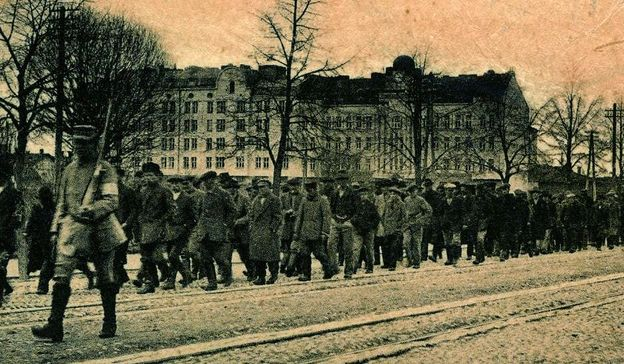
- Captured Reds in Viipuri.
Date	24–29 April 1918 (5 days)
Location	Viipuri, Finland
Result	White victory

Belligerents
Finnish Whites	Finnish Reds

Commanders and leaders
Ernst Löfström; K. F. Wilkman; Aarne Sihvo; Eduard Ausfeld; Ulrich von Coler	Oskar Rantala †; Edvard Gylling; Kullervo Manner; Mikhail Svechnikov

Strength
18,500	5,000 in combat units

Casualties and losses
c. 400 killed	c. 500 killed in action c. 800 executed 11,350 captured 12,650 total casualties

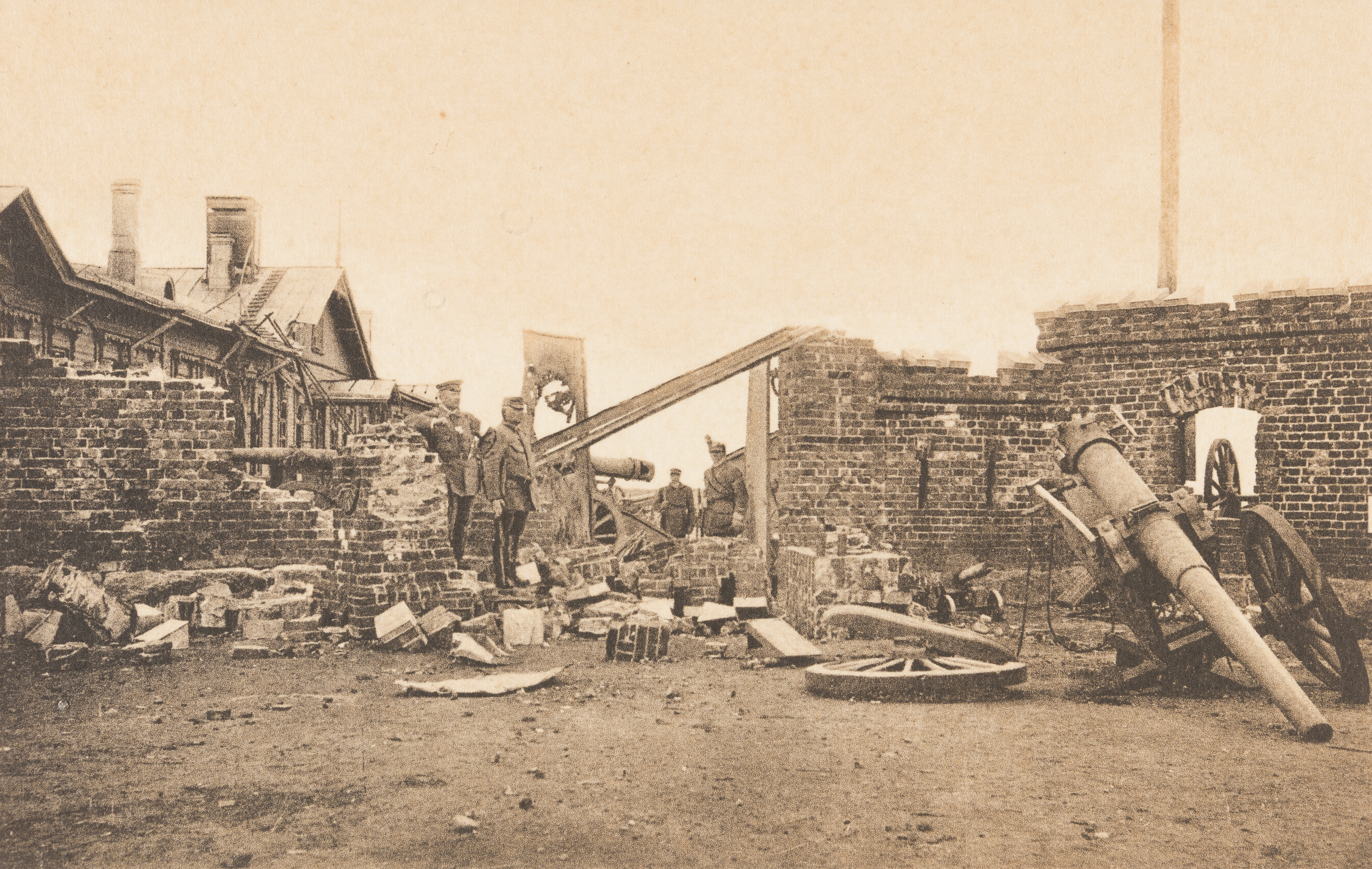
Patterinmäki Fort after the battle.

The Battle of Viipuri was a 1918 Finnish Civil War battle, fought 24–29 April between the Finnish Whites and the Finnish Reds in Viipuri. Together with the Battle of Tampere and Battle of Helsinki, it was one of the three major urban battles of the Finnish Civil War. The battle is also remembered because of its bloody aftermath, as the Whites executed up to 400 non-aligned military personnel and civilians of Russian and associated ethnicities.

== Background ==
At the time of the Finnish Civil War, Viipuri was the fourth-largest city in Finland, with about 30,000 people. The surrounding Viipuri Province was the largest Finnish province with a population of 540,000. Viipuri was also the most multicultural city in Finland with a large minority of Russians and smaller minorities of Swedes, Germans, Tatars and Jews. Its location at the Karelian Isthmus near the Russian capital Petrograd made the city an important center of transport and trade. During the Civil War, Viipuri was under Red control from its beginning in late January. Since 9 April, Viipuri had been the capital of Red Finland as the Red Government and the Red Guard general staff left Helsinki.

== The units ==
The White Army formed a new unit for the offensive. The 18,300-strong Eastern Army (Itäarmeija) was under the command of the former Savo Division leader general major Ernst Löfström. It was composed of three regiments; the Western Unit was commanded by Lieutenant-Colonel Aarne Sihvo, the Northern by General Major Karl Fredrik Wilkman and the Eastern by the German Colonel Eduard Ausfeld.

The defense of Viipuri was first led by the head of the Red Government Kullervo Manner. After Manner fled to the Soviet Russia on 25 April, he was followed by Edvard Gylling. The Red Guard leader was Oskar Rantala, with the Russian colonel Mikhail Svechnikov as his military advisor. On the days of the battle, there were more than 12,000 Reds and their families in Viipuri. About 10,000 were refugees who had fled from the western parts of Finland. The combat units had up to 5,000 fighters, including forces retreating from the Karelian Front and some members of the Viipuri Women's Red Guard.

== Encirclement of Viipuri ==
The offensive against Viipuri was launched on 19 April when colonel Ausfeld's unit marched to south from Rautu, in order to block the Reds' connection to Russia. On 23 April, Ausfeld cut the Petrograd railroad in Raivola, 75 kilometres east of Viipuri. During the following evening, his troops took the villages of Terijoki and Kuokkala by the Bay of Finland. Terijoki Red Guard, commanded by the infamous Heikki Kaljunen, was the last Red unit to escape and cross the border. On the same day, the Northern Regiment headed towards Viipuri from Antrea, which is located 30 kilometres north of Viipuri.

In the evening of 23 April, the Red general staff in Viipuri ordered all forces of the Karelian front to retreat to Viipuri. The Reds of Joutseno, Antrea and Taipalsaari first marched to Lappeenranta and were then transported to Viipuri by train on the night of 24–25 April. At the same time, most of the Red Government fled to Petrograd by sea. Edvard Gylling was the only Red leader to stay in Viipuri. Gylling had negotiations with the German colonel Ulrich von Coler, but von Coler did not promise to treat the Reds by the Hague Convention. The Reds then had a meeting at the Viipuri Castle, where they decided to defend the city. Red units were divided into three units; the Northern Battalion was commanded by the worker Otto Vuoristo, Eastern by the Lappeenranta Red Guard leader Viktor Ripatti and the Western by the actor Jalmari Parikka.

On 24 April, a company led by von Coler took the Tali railway station 10 kilometres north of Viipuri, cutting the Viipuri–Joensuu railroad. His unit then evaded Viipuri and took the two nearest railway stations of the Petrograd railway. In the evening, von Coler defied his orders by attacking the city, but could not break through the Red defense on the eastern side of the Papula Bay. As the Sihvo's regiment blocked the city from the west, Viipuri was now encircled by the White Army and the only way out was by the sea.

== Battle in the city ==
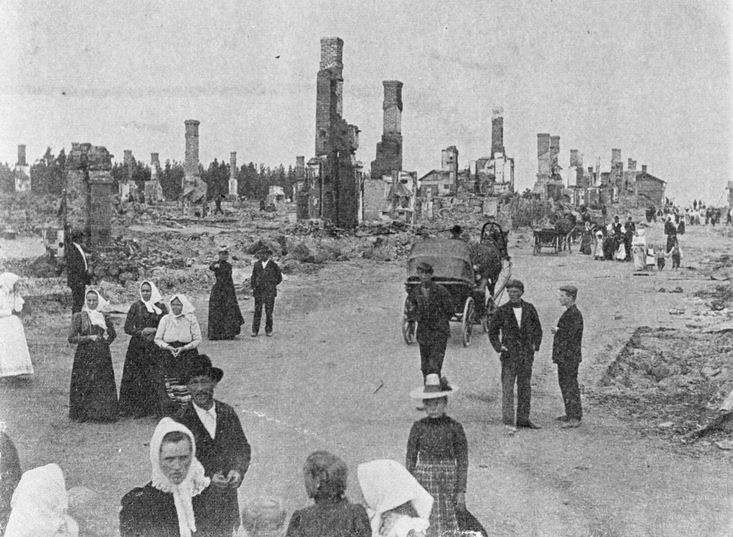
Kolikkoinmäki neighbourhood was destroyed by artillery fire.

On the night of 23–24 April, the underground Viipuri White Guard was activated. The Guard took the artillery fort in the Patterinmäki Hill, but in the morning they had to surrender, as the Whites could not hold the governmental buildings. The White Army made its first efforts to enter the city on 25–26 April but the Reds managed to push them back. The Whites had great losses, as they used conscripted units without former combat experience. Some of the men even had sympathies for the Reds.

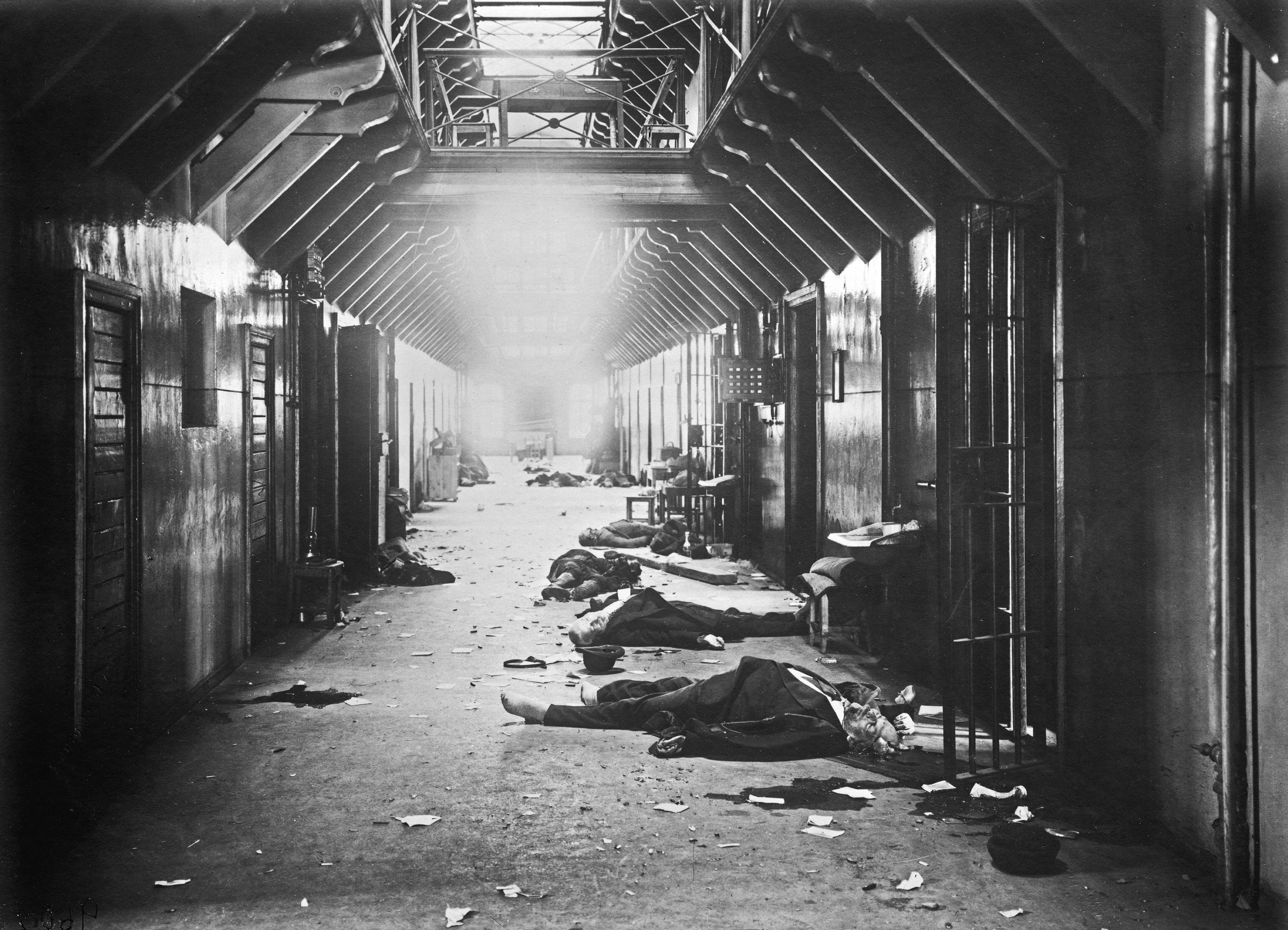
White victims of Red terror at Viipuri county jail.

The Whites launched their decisive attack on 27 April at 12 noon. It was preceded by hours of artillery fire, which destroyed the Patterinmäki Fort and the working-class neighbourhood of Kolikkoinmäki. The conscripts were now mostly replaced by White Guards who had been fighting at the Karelian Front and White Army soldiers from the Savo Front. On the night of 27–28 April, a group of Reds entered the Viipuri Prison, where leading Whites had been kept for several weeks. After hours of heavy drinking, they shot more than 30 prisoners. Among the victims were two members of the Finnish Parliament, Leander Ikonen and Matti Pietinen.

The Whites finally took the city after heavy street fighting on the morning of 29 April. 1,000 Reds managed to break through the siege and headed west but they were soon captured. 500 of them were found shot dead. Some of the Reds were also evacuated to Petrograd by sea.

== Aftermath ==
As the Whites took control of Viipuri, they conducted mass executions of Red Guard soldiers. Some 1,200 people were shot, including up to 400 Russians. The largest mass executions were carried out in the Annenkrone fort on the western side of the city. Red Guard soldiers remained in the city and hid among the civilian population. The Red Guards joined the ranks of those celebrating the liberation of the city. However, their speech, behavior, and clothing often betrayed them. Many of those arrested were shot immediately. The acts of revenge were further fueled by the discovery of dead bodies of White Guards and other bourgeois that had been killed prior to the fall of the city.

On the next few days after the battle, more than 10,000 Reds were captured. During the next five months, more than 800 Reds died in the Viipuri Prison Camp of executions, hunger and disease.

== See also ==
- Battle of Helsinki
- Battle of Lahti
- Battle of Tampere
