= Karl Söderman =

vuorineuvos Karl Wilhelm Söderman
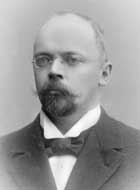
- Born: 7 May 1863; Oulu, Grand Duchy of Finland
- Died: 21 October 1911 (aged 48); Meran, Austria-Hungary
- Education: engineer (1886)
- Spouse: Ellen née Stenberg
- Children: Karl Helmer Åke (b. 1889); Saga Margareta (b. 1897)
- Parent(s): Karl Söderman and Margaretha née Lybeck
- Awards: vuorineuvos (1911)

Manager of John Stenberg's Engineering Works
- In office 1887–1892
- Preceded by: John Stenberg

Manager of Kone- ja Siltarakennus
- In office 1892–1911
- Succeeded by: Carl Enckell

Karl Wilhelm Söderman (7 May 1863 – 21 October 1911) was a Finnish engineer, businessman and vuorineuvos.

Before his studies Söderman worked for Helsinki Gas Works, where he got a staunch practical experience of shop floor work. After graduating in Polytechnic Institute as 22-year-old engineer in 1886 he started working for John Stenberg's Engineering Works. The owner died in the same year after which Söderman managed and developed the company during 1887–1892.

In 1892, Söderman started as manager of Kone ja Silta, which during his leadership grew the largest engineering company of Finland.

Söderman was twice member of Helsinki City Council and founding member of Finnish General Employers' Organisation.

He died to an unknown disease during health travel in Meran, South Tyrol.

== Early life and studies ==
Söderman was born in Oulu, Northern Ostrobothnia. His parents were sawmill operator Karl Söderman, whose roots were in Kronoby, and Margaretha née Lybeck. Soon after his birth the family moved to Pori and onward to Kaunissaari in Porvoo, where the father became property manager of August Eklöf's steam sawmill. Already at a young age Söderman became familiar with timber industry. Söderman had his primary education in Porvoo. After the primary school Söderman started working in Helsinki Gas Works' engineering shop; he became familiar with engineering workshop operations including model carpenter, plumber and coppersmith work. At the same time there worked many innovative engineers, such as Edvin Bergroth.

Söderman managed to get into Polytechnic Institute in 1882. He funded his studies by doing drawing work and giving private lessons, and participated in student organisational activities. Söderman graduated engineer in 1886.

== Career ==
=== John Stenberg's Engineering Works ===
After graduating, Söderman started working for John Stenberg's Engineering Works. The founder John Didrik Stenberg passed away in the same year. The widow Pauline Stenberg offered the company to Edvin Bergroth, who refused, as he had recently started as technical manager in Nobel Brothers in Baku. 22-year-old Söderman, without experience about company management, rented the engineering works for 1887–1888 and continued managing it until 1892. During his leadership the company made 12,000–15,000 marks' annual profit and product quality was improved substantially.

In 1888, Söderman married daughter of John Stenberg, 19-year-old Ellen Stenberg.

=== Kone- ja Siltarakennus ===
Söderman's capability was noted by Gunnar Lindqvist, manager of Brobyggnads Ab, who invited him in December 1891 to lead a new company Maskin- och Brobyggnads Ab (Finnish: Kone- ja Siltarakennus Oy, "Machine and Bridge Construction Limited"; shortened as Kone ja Silta), which was created in result of merger between Osbergska Verkstad and Brobyggnads Ab. The main products were railway bridges and steam boilers. Although the beginning was difficult, few months after the company started increasingly receiving orders from Russia. In 1894 orders to Russia reached 1.1 million marks, which formed 80% of the total sales; in the following year the Russian orders were already 1.6 million marks, which made Kone ja Silta the biggest Engineering company of Finland in terms of gross value added.

Dependency on the Russian market created problems when political tensions between the Russian Empire and Grand Duchy of Finland culminated in 1902: a political committee in Russia suggested that Finland shall be treated as foreign country in tariff policy which would mean high toll fees for Finnish products. Finnish engineering companies became concerned and wrote a common letter which Karl Söderman and John Eager, manager of W:m Crichton & C:o delivered together to Vladimir Kovalevsky in Ministry of Finance. Although the meeting was not successful, the Russian government cancelled the plans of extra tariffs at the end of the year.

The average annual GVA was under one million marks in period 1892–1894, but in period 1904–1908 it was quadrupled. The top year was in 1905, when the company benefited from increased orders due to the Russo-Japanese War; the GVA reached 6.2 million marks.

=== Political and organisational activities ===
Söderman was member of Helsinki City Council during 1896–1901 and 1904–1906.

As Söderman had worked on shop floor himself, he had good communication and understanding with the company workers. He founded a common pension fund for Kone ja Silta blue and white collar workers and strove for creating a national accident and health insurance system. In 1899 he attended in a committee that investigated possibilities to start vocational school for metal workers.

Striking became increasingly common at the beginning of the 20th century. Unrest experienced in 1902 in particular prompted the employers to create a counter-force to trade unions. This was initiated by Adolf Engström, manager of Hietalahti Shipyard and Engineering works. The organisation was founded in 1903 and Söderman became the first chairman of the new Confederation of Metal Industrialists. At the beginning many employers were not interested to unionise and the new union was too weak. The situation changed after the general strike of 1905; the Finnish General Employers' Organisation was founded in 1906 and Söderman was its board member until his death. According to contemporary documents of the organisation, Söderman had a major role at its establishment.

== Personal life ==
Söderman had three children with Ellen née Stenberg (1868–1923): son Karl Helmer was born in 1889 and became later engineer, and daughter Saga Margareta was born in 1897. Daughter Ellen Alfhild (b. 1891) was married to the anthropologist and communist Ivar Lassy.

Söderman's favourite hobby was yachting. He was vice commodore of Nyländska Jaktklubben and he won several sail racing prizes in Finland and Sweden.

For many years Söderman suffered of an unknown disease. He travelled to Meran, South Tyrol for health holiday in 1911 but deceased during the trip.
