= Smolna, Helsinki =

Building in Helsinki, Finland

Smolna
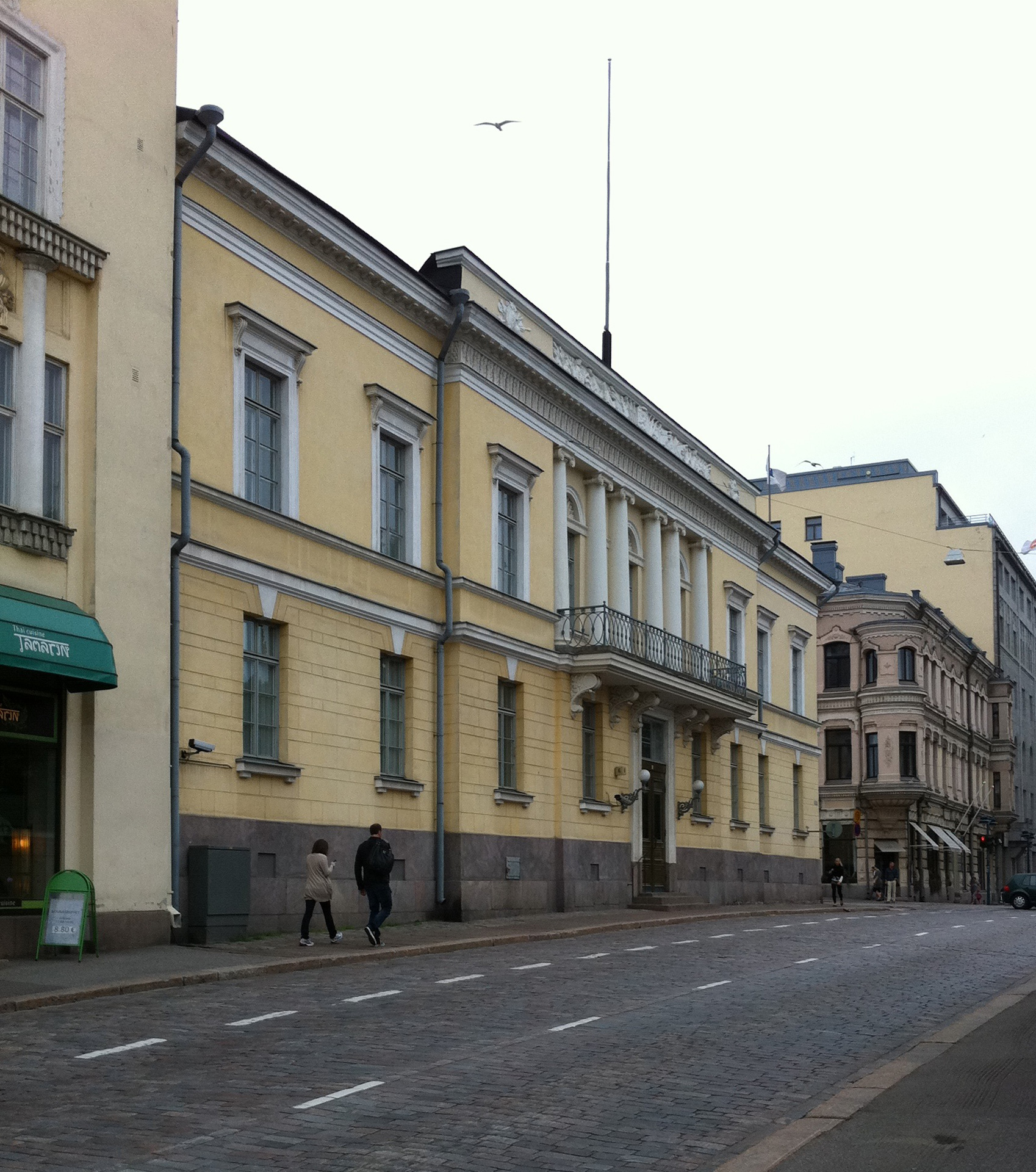
- Interactive map of the Smolna area

General information
- Location: Eteläesplanadi 6, Helsinki
- Coordinates: 60°10′1.5″N 24°56′59.5″E
- Current tenants: Finnish Government
- Completed: 1822

Design and construction
- Architect: Carl Ludwig Engel

The Smolna is an Empire style building in the Kaartinkaupunki district of Helsinki, Finland. It is usually used by the Finnish Government as a banquet hall as well as a space for hosting visiting dignitaries and government negotiations. However, currently it is serving as the government headquarters due to renovations of the Government Palace, though activities other than meetings will take place in an adjacent building on Eteläesplanadi 4

== History ==
The Smolna was completed in 1822 as the house of the inspector general of the Military of the Grand Duchy of Finland. In 1833 it was turned into the residence of the Governor-General of Finland. During the 1918 Finnish Civil War, the house served as the Red Guard headquarters and was nicknamed ″Smolna″, after the Bolshevik headquarters in the Smolny Institute of Saint Petersburg.

After the Civil War, the nickname remained. The building was first the residence of the German general Rüdiger von der Goltz and the regent of Finland C. G. E. Mannerheim until 1919. The building was then used by the government for various purposes, including as the residence of the foreign minister, before being renovated in 1964 to serve as a banquet hall for the Finnish Government.

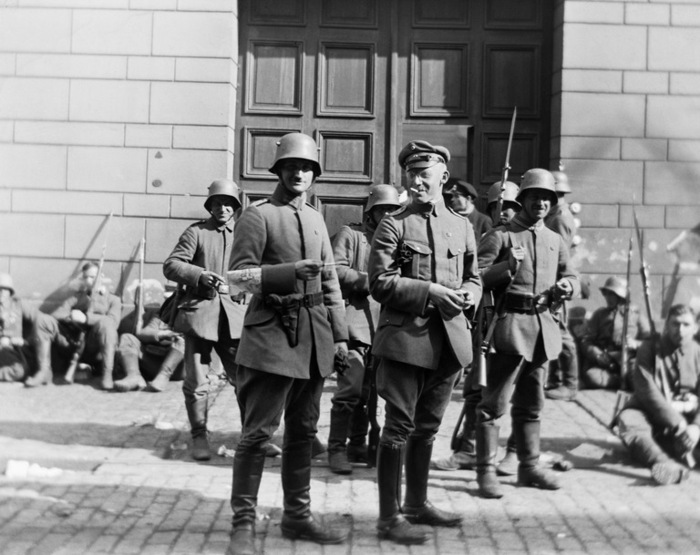
Officers of the German Baltic Sea Division in front of Smolna
