= Efraim Kronqvist =

Finnish politician

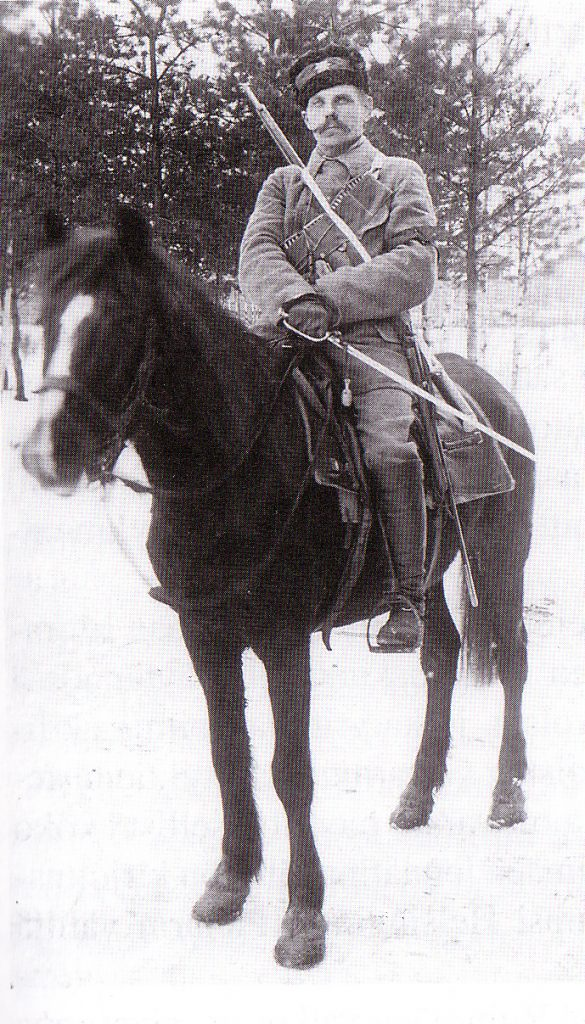
Efraim Kronqvist

Efraim Kronqvist (2 August 1874, Sortavala - 22 May 1918, Hausjärvi) was a Finnish house painter and politician. He was a member of the Parliament of Finland from 1909 to 1913, representing the Social Democratic Party of Finland (SDP). In 1918 he was imprisoned for having sided with the Reds during the Finnish Civil War. He died in detention.
