= Eduard Ausfeld (colonel) =

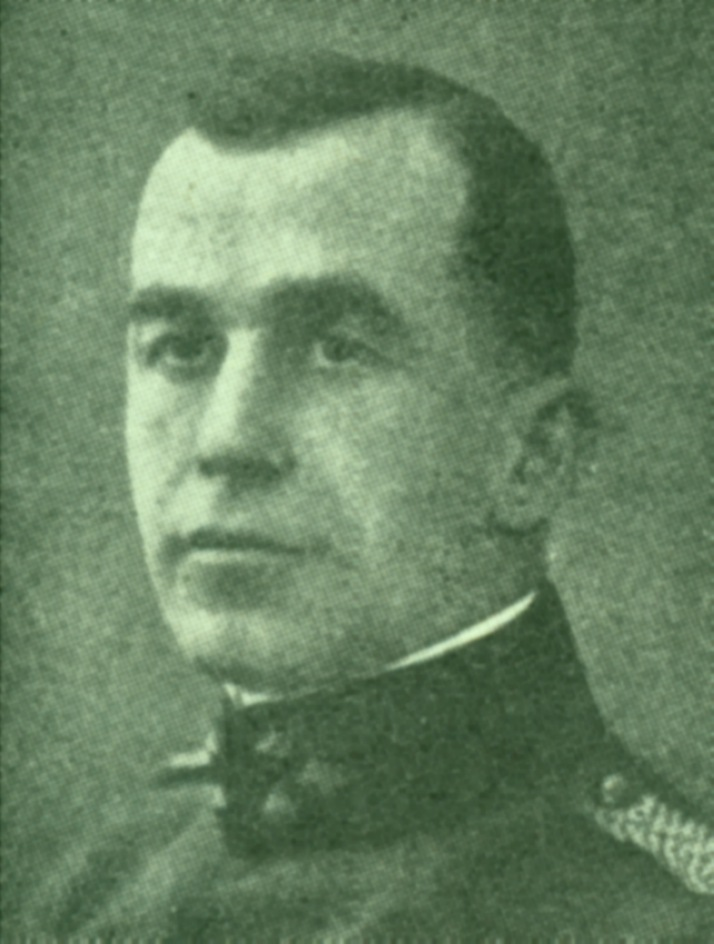
- Born: 1885
- Died: 1946 (aged 60–61)
- Occupation: Military officer

Ernst Wilhelm Eduard Ausfeld (1885–1946) was a German military officer who served as a trainer for Finnish volunteers in the Jäger Movement and participated as a commander in the Finnish Civil War on the side of the White Army. He took part in the Battle of Tampere and the Battle of Vyborg.

== Biography ==
Ausfeld served as an instructor for Finnish volunteers in Germany from 1915 to 1918. In 1917, he became the commander of the 27th Royal Prussian Jäger Battalion.

During the Finnish Civil War in 1918, he arrived in Finland and was appointed colonel of the 1st Jäger Regiment and later commander of the 1st Jäger Brigade. He participated in key battles, including the Battle of Tampere, where he initially led a retreat after a failed assault and subsequently commanded one of the attacking units during the capture of the city.

Following the capture of Tampere, Ausfeld took part in operations on the Karelian Isthmus, cutting the railway connection to Petrograd and later capturing Ino Fortress in May 1918.

After the war, Ausfeld remained in Finland as a trainer and briefly served in the White Guard, including as chief of staff in 1920.

== Awards ==
- Order of the Cross of Liberty

== Bibliography ==
- "Ausfeld, Eduard (1885-1946) : överste (kirj. Risto Marjomaa)". Biografiskt lexikon för Finland. 2, Ryska tiden (in Swedish). Helsinki: Svenska litteratursällskapet i Finland. 2009. pp. 72–73. ISBN 978-951-583-185-9.
