= Baltic Sea Division =

German armed forces unit in service during WWI

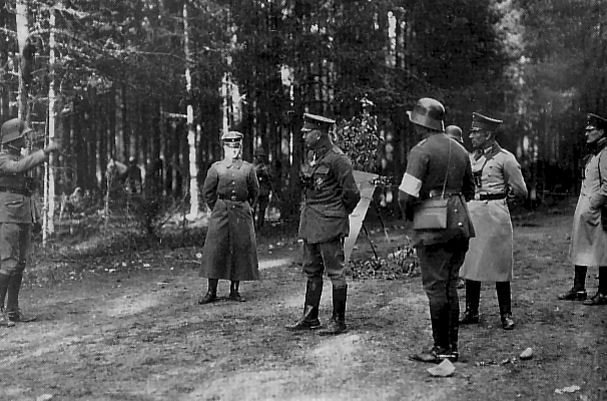
Rüdiger von der Goltz in Finland in 1918

The Baltic Sea Division (German: Ostsee-Division) was a 10,000 man German military unit commanded by Rüdiger von der Goltz. The core of the division comprised two army brigades from the German Eastern Front: 95. Reserve Infantry Brigade (led by Colonel K. Wolff) and 2. Guards Cavalry Brigade (led by Colonel H. von Tschirsky und von Bögendorff). They were supported by additional artillery and pioneer troops, and transported to Finland by a naval squadron led by Hugo Meurer.

The military activity of the division in Finland served part of the foreign policy of the German Empire after the Treaty of Brest-Litovsk with Soviet Russia, signed on 3 March 1918. Germany aimed to establish a chain of satellite states in eastern Europe in order to provide raw materials for German industry and food products for the German people.

The Finnish Senate of Vaasa had requested German military aid for the Whites. The Finnish Senate paid all the financial costs of the military intervention of the Baltic Sea Division and urged the Finnish people to provide food, shelter, and any other aid needed by the Baltic Sea Division.

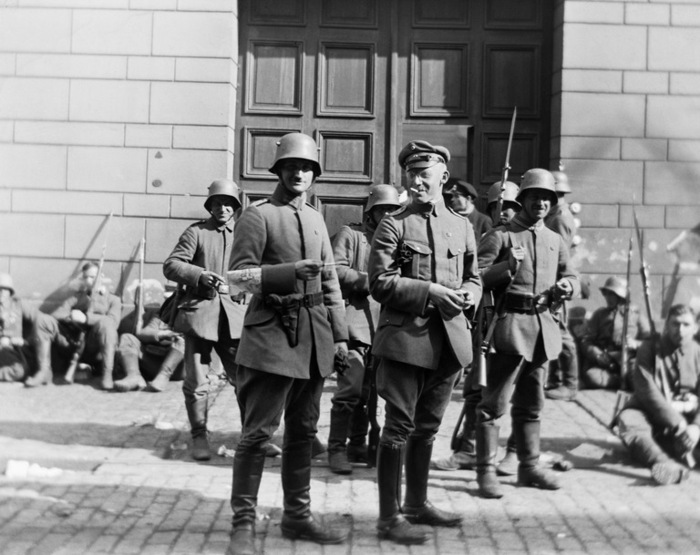
Officers of the Baltic Sea Division in front of Smolna after their troops had taken the Red Guard headquarters in Helsinki after the city battle.

During the Finnish Civil War, on 3 April 1918, it landed at Hanko and moved towards Helsinki and Lahti. The Baltic Sea Division quickly took Helsinki from the Red Guards, who had previously deposed the official government in Helsinki. This enabled the Senate to return to Helsinki.

On 11 November 1918, the armistice ended World War I. Von der Goltz and his division left Helsinki on 16 December 1918.

== See also ==
- Detachment Brandenstein
- Battle of Helsinki
