= Red Guards (Finland) =

Paramilitary organization in early 20th-century Finland

- Punakaarti (Finnish); Röda gardet (Swedish)
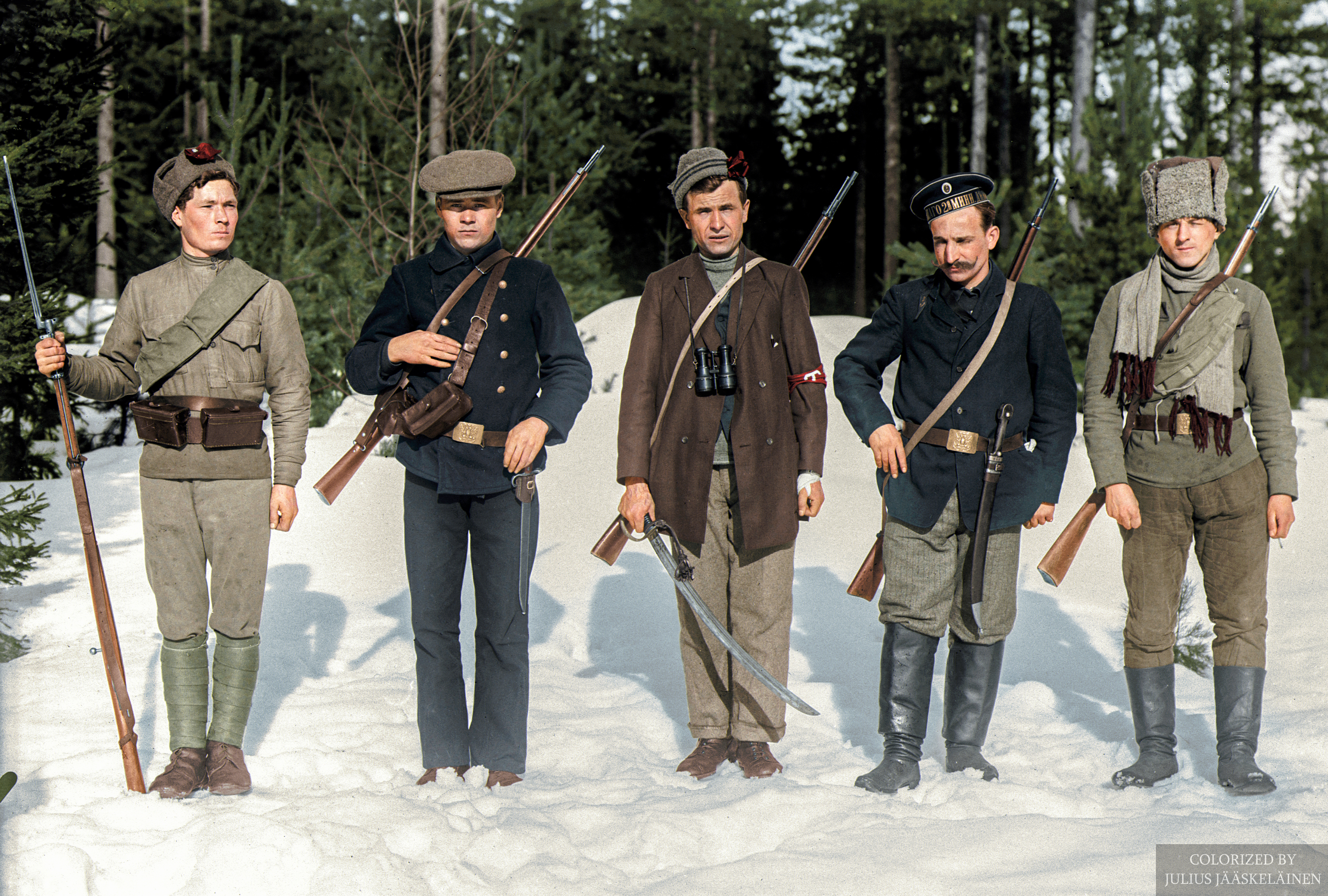
- Red Guards and Russians fighting on the red side in Ruovesi, Pirkanmaa, Finland in 1918
- Leaders: Johan Kock; Ali Aaltonen; Eero Haapalainen; Eino Rahja; Kullervo Manner; Otto Wille Kuusinen
- Dates active: 1905–1907; 1917–1920
- Allegiance: Finnish Socialist Workers' Republic (Jan-May 1918); Social Democratic Party of Finland
- Active regions: Finland (FSWR), East Karelia
- Ideology: Socialism; Communism; Left-wing nationalism
- Wars: the Russian Revolution of 1905 and Finnish Civil War

The Red Guards (Finnish: Punakaarti, IPA: [ˈpunɑˌkɑːrti]; Swedish: Röda gardet) were the paramilitary units of the labour movement in Finland during the early 1900s. The Red Guards formed the army of Red Finland and were one of the main belligerents of the Finnish Civil War in 1918.

The Red Guards were first established during the 1905 general strike but disbanded a year later until they were re-established after the February Revolution in 1917. The combined strength of the Red Guard was about 30,000 at the beginning of the Civil War, peaking at between 90,000 and 120,000 during the course of the conflict, including more than 2,000 members of the Women's Guards. The Red Guards were defeated in Finland by the Whites in May 1918 and around 80,000 were captured as prisoners of war, where 12,000 to 14,000 of them died in the post-war prison camps due to disease, malnutrition, and execution. Most Red Guards were pardoned by the Government of Finland in late 1918.

Approximately 10,000 to 13,000 Red Guards fled to Soviet Russia where some fought against the Finnish Whites in the Russian Civil War, including the North Russia intervention and the Estonian War of Independence. The Red Guards ceased to exist as an organized force by 1920.

== 1905 general strike and Sveaborg rebellion ==
=== Establishment ===
The Red Guards came about during a general strike in November 1905. The strike began in reaction to the Russification of Finland and was a joint effort between the Social Democratic labour movement and the political right. The strike lasted only a week, but in the final days differing views created a deep gap between the two parties. The National Guard, which was established for law enforcement as the police began to participate, was likewise split into the working-class Red Guards and the bourgeoisie-aligned Protection Corps. Some minor incidents followed, especially in the capital Helsinki, but violent clashes were avoided. Although the general strike was over, both guards remained active. In 1906, the number of Red Guard members was estimated at 25,000.

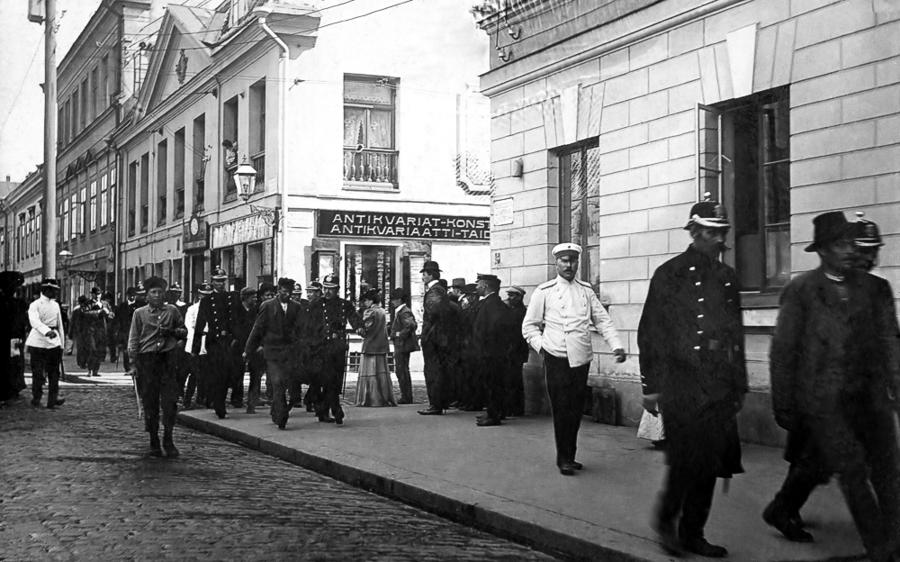
Arrested Reds are taken in custody after the 1906 Sveaborg rebellion.

=== Hakaniemi riot ===
The Hakaniemi riot was violence between the two sides that finally burst out on 2 August 1906 during the Sveaborg rebellion, a revolt of the Russian Bolshevik sailors in the Sveaborg Fortress in Helsinki. As the mutiny started, the Helsinki Red Guard, led by Johan Kock, joined the rebellion by conducting sabotage in the mainland. In the final day of the revolt, Johan Kock declared a general strike on his own, without permission from the Social Democratic Party, which was leading the Finnish labour movement in the absence of any central trade union. The strike was joined by thousands of Helsinki workers.

The bourgeoisie opposed the strike and sent the Protection Corps to the Hakaniemi working-class district in order to keep the city's tram traffic rolling. At Hakaniemi Square the Protection Corps was surrounded by an angry mob of local people throwing stones. The incident escalated into a gunfight between the Protection Corps and the Red Guards, supported by a squad of Russian sailors. The riot was finally disrupted by the Russian cossacks, ending with two Reds and seven Protection Corps members dead.

200 people were arrested, but only one Red Guard platoon leader was convicted, as there was not enough evidence against the others. The funeral of the slain Reds became a mass demonstration against the violence of the bourgeoisie. The Protection Corps, in turn, arranged a large funeral as a protest against Red violence.

Once the Sveaborg rebellion was suppressed, 900 Russian mutineers and about 100 Red Guard members were arrested. 77 Reds were convicted.

=== Dissolution ===
As a result of the Hakaniemi riot, the Senate of Finland banned both guards. The Social Democratic Party had already decided to disband the Red Guards in the party congress held in Oulu in late August. Some delegates opposed the decision and had a secret meeting where an underground organization was established to preserve the Red Guards. The organization was soon revealed to the party leaders but the underground Red Guards were active until the 1907 general election. Their task was to be prepared for the possible revolution in Russia.

== 1917 re-establishment ==
=== February Revolution ===
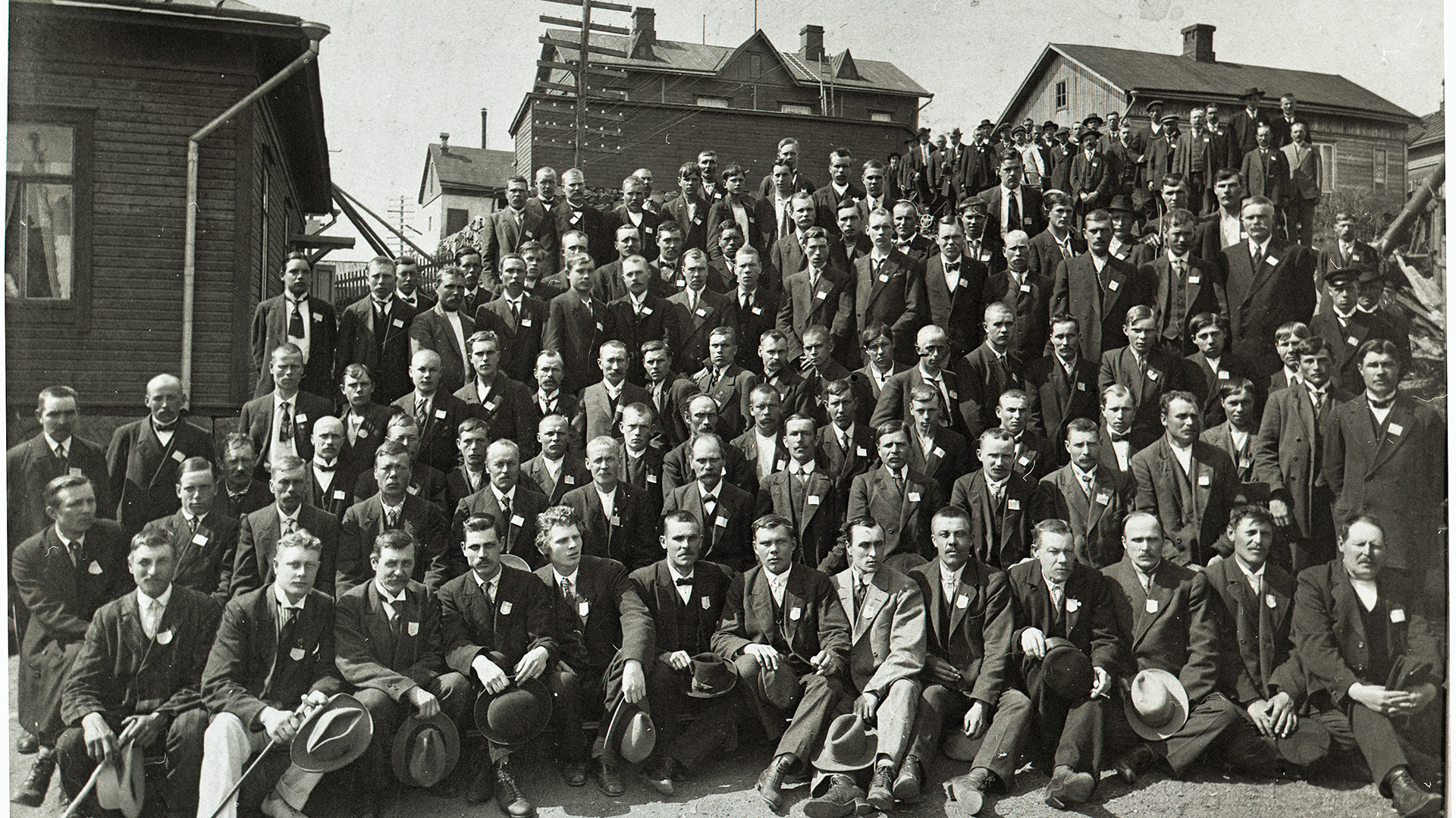
Worker's Militia in the Turku suburb of Maaria during the general strike of May 1917.

The Red Guards were re-established during the 1917 Russian Revolution as a result of disputes over law enforcement and the general turmoil in the Grand Duchy of Finland. After the February Revolution, the Russian-controlled police force lost its status in Finland. The role of law enforcement was first transferred to the Russian military, which turned it over to local labour organizations. The established unarmed units were temporary and had no further revolutionary goals.

Finally, a new People's Militia was organized in late March in the seventeen largest Finnish towns. The political right did not accept the new arrangement and the Senate formed a committee to solve the dispute.

On 18 July, the so-called "power law" was passed in the Social Democratic majority parliament. The power to enact laws was to be transferred from Saint Petersburg to Helsinki and from the Senate to the parliament. This law would have enabled a purely Social Democratic government to be formed in consequence of the position the party gained in the 1916 election. The Russian Provisional Government refused to approve the law and, with the co-operation of the Finnish bourgeois parties, dissolved the parliament.

In the October 1917 election, the Social Democratic Party lost its majority, although it remained the largest party with 92 seats. The Senate now disbanded the People's Militia and established a police force which left-wing and labour activists were not allowed to join.

=== Workers' Order Guards ===
The food shortage launched a large number of agricultural strikes during the summer of 1917. On 13 July, a violent clash between the striking farm workers and their employers occurred in the Western Finnish municipality of Huittinen. The incident is often seen as the beginning of the events which finally led to the Civil War in January 1918. After the Huittinen riot, the right-wing farmers in the Satakunta province started forming Protection Guards and were soon followed in other parts of the country.

The labour movement responded by establishing Workers' Order Guards. By the early October, guards were formed in seventeen towns and twenty rural municipalities, mostly in the industrialized areas of the Turku and Pori, Uusimaa and Viipuri provinces. These units had up to 7,000–8,000 men. On 20 October, the Finnish Trade Union Federation urged the party and trade union locals to establishing Workers' Order Guards throughout the country.

In the next three weeks, the number of guards increase to 237 with more than 30,000 members. The rules of the Guards were published in the party newspapers. The formation was very similar to a common military organization, though the commander was replaced with a five-men committee.

Finland was now split into two camps; the middle and upper classes, including the wealthy farmers, against the working class, poor peasants and the landless people. The first violent incidents between the Protective Guards and the Workers' Order Guards occurred during the general strike in November 1917. More workers were still joining the Order Guards, as the strike ended on 20 November, the number of members was 40,000–50,000. The newspaperman Ali Aaltonen, who had served as a lieutenant in the Imperial Russian Army, was named the first commander-in-chief of the Workers' Order Guards.

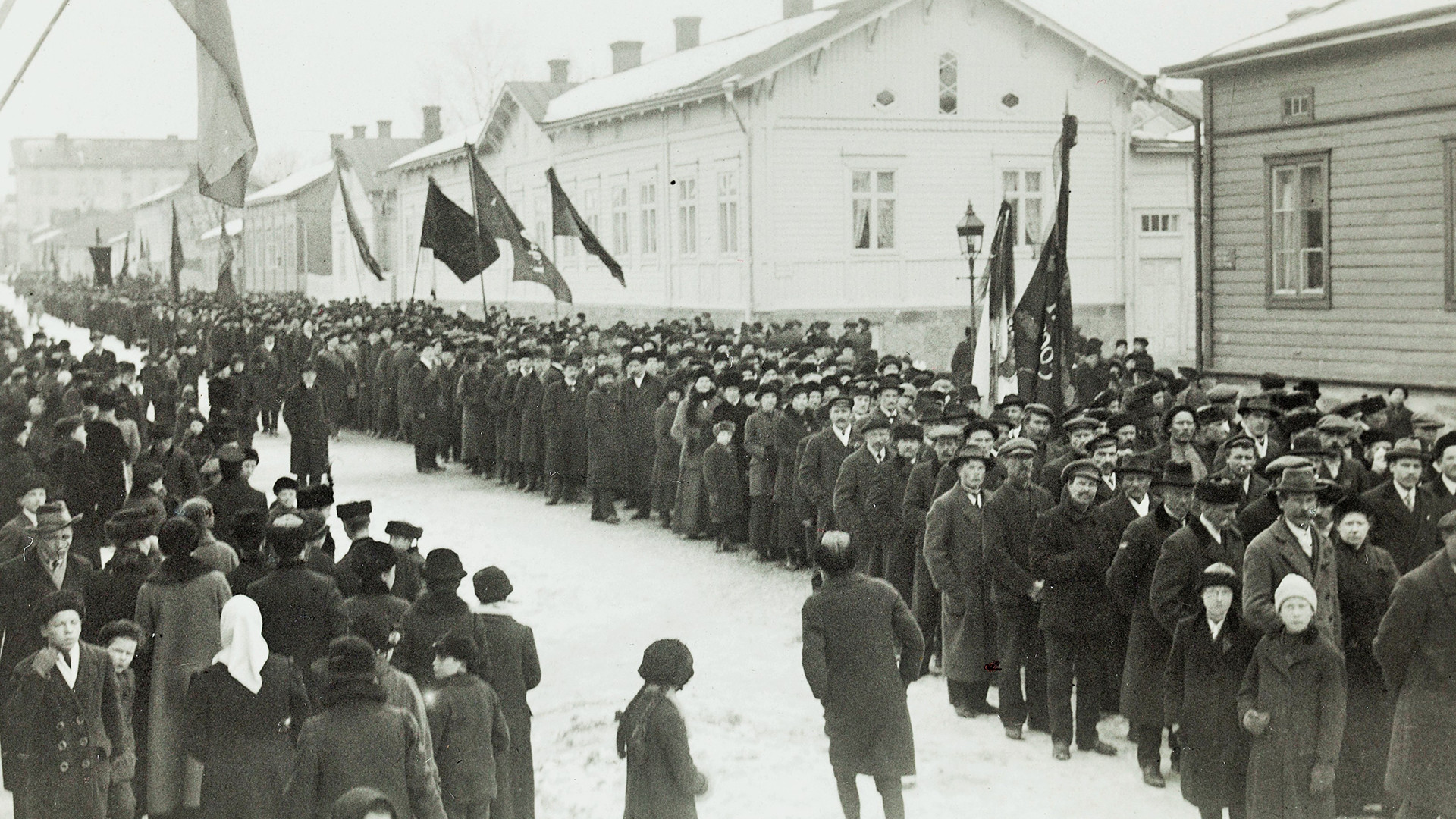
A demonstration in Turku in March 1917.

The general strike was the first time the Workers' Order Guards were used as a nationwide organization. In many places, they were actually leading the strike, instead of the strike committees. The guards were acting on their own, searching for food supplies and weapons from wealthy houses. As the right-wing Protection Corps were rather weak, the Workers' Order Guards could usually act without any resistance, although, in some places, the Protection Corps took up arms, which resulted in violent clashes, prefiguring the oncoming Civil War.

The Workers' Order Guards were most powerful in Helsinki as they were armed by the Russian troops. The Helsinki Guard captured a couple hundred people and invaded the House of the Estates, which prevented the Senate from working. The leaders of the Social Democratic Party strictly condemned this kind of action, insisting the militant guards must be taken under the party control. Soon after the general strike, the first congress of the Worker's Order Guards was held in the Tampere Workers' Hall on 16–18 December 1917. By the new rules adopted in the meeting, the guards were now under an unconditional authority of the Social Democratic Party and the Trade Union Federation.

=== Drift toward war ===
After Finland gained its independence from Soviet Russia on 6 December 1917, disagreement and discontent were still growing. Incidents occurred across the country as the striking workers and the Workers' Order Guards clashed with the Protection Corps and right-wing bourgeoisie. Unemployed demonstrators surrounded the town hall for two days in Viipuri and in Tampere the city council was captured by the local Workers' Order Guard. In Turku, the Order Guard occupied town offices and captured the chief of police. The Protection Corps attacked the labour activists in some places too.

On 6 January, the Helsinki Workers' Order Guard declared itself independent from the Social Democratic Party. The unit was renamed the Helsinki Red Guard. Three days later, the guard occupied the residence of the Governor-General of Finland. It was now called as the Smolna, like the Bolshevik headquarters in Saint Petersburg. On the same day, the Helsinki Guard sent 200 men to Sipoo to search for guns hidden by the local Protection Corps. The operation escalated into a gunfight in which two Reds were killed.

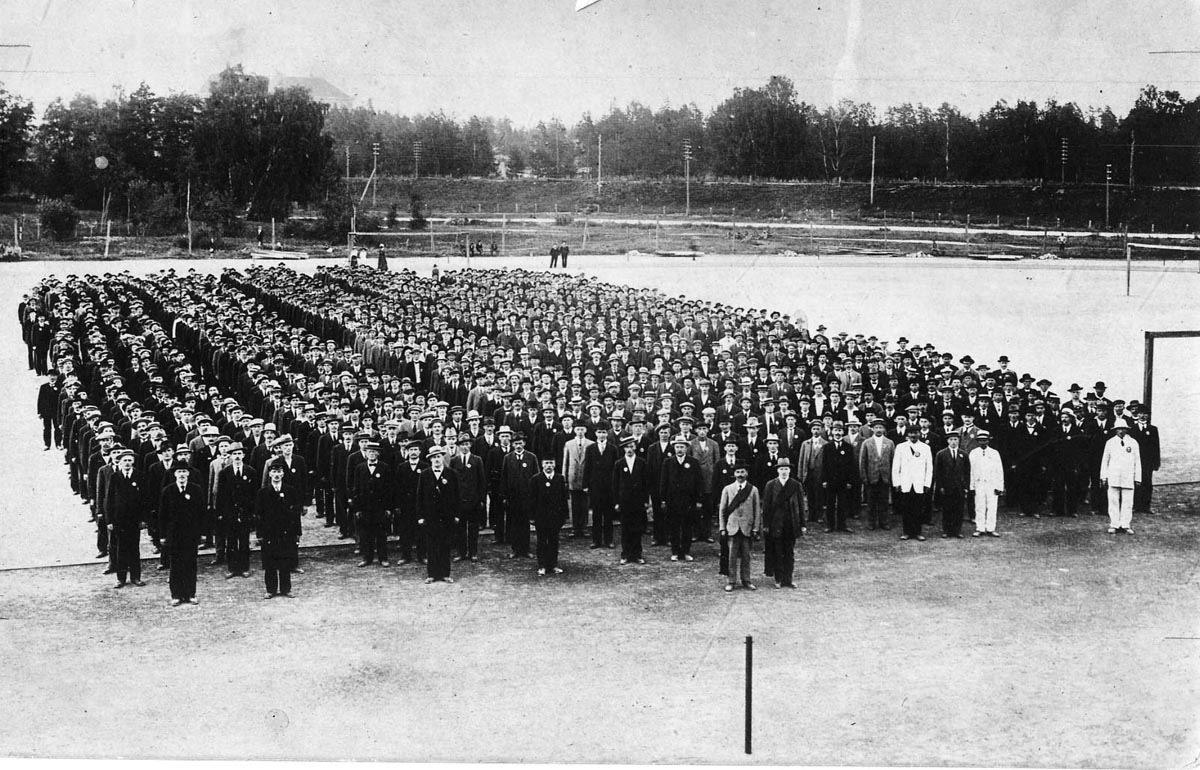
Helsinki Worker's Order Guard in the fall of 1917.

At the beginning of 1918, the Workers' Order Guards still had very few guns. For example, the largest guard in Helsinki was armed with only 20–30 military rifles. In early January, the commander-in-chief Ali Aaltonen went to Saint Petersburg to acquire weaponry from the Bolsheviks. On 13 January, Aaltonen informed the general staff of the cargo of 10,000 rifles and 10 artillery pieces which would be brought to Finland within a couple of weeks. At the same time, the Protection Corps was preparing to receive 60,000 rifles from Germany.

Up to this point, many of the largest Workers' Order Guards were occupied by radicals who were pushing the Finnish labour movement towards an armed conflict. They were no longer under the authority of the Social Democratic Party or the Trade Union Federation. In order to keep the labour movement united, the party leadership was forced to negotiate with the revolutionary guards. Many of the leading Social Democrats, such as Väinö Tanner, Taavi Tainio and Evert Huttunen, were moderate and opposed armed revolution and the acts of the Order Guards.

In 19–23 January, violent clashes between the Workers' Order Guards and the Protection Corps occurred in eastern Finland in Viipuri and Luumäki and in the western part of the country in Kiikka. In Viipuri, the second largest city in Finland, the Protection Corps was trying to seize control but was expelled from the town. Another serious incident was in Luumäki, as the Protection Corps seized 200 rifles at the Taavetti railway station. Two days later, the Workers' Guards attacked the Protection Corps in order to take the guns back.

Finally, on 25 January, the Senate declared the Protection Corps to be government troops. The Social Democrats and the labour movement interpreted this as a declaration of war against the working class. As a result, the Workers' Order Guards and the Helsinki Red Guard were merged into the paramilitary Red Guard of Finland (Suomen Punainen Kaarti) and the revolution was proclaimed in the late evening of 26 January by lighting a red lantern as a sign on the tower of the Helsinki Workers' Hall. The order for the mobilization came on the next morning from the executive committee of the Trade Union Federation, coinciding with the spontaneous clashing of Red Guards and the Protection Corps.

== 1918 Civil War ==
=== Commanders ===
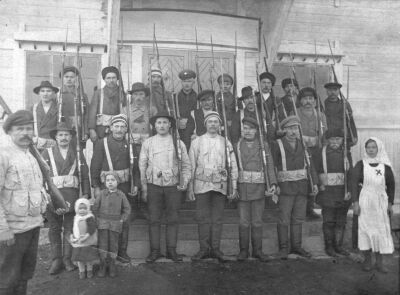
A Red Guard unit from Pertteli.

The first commander-in-chief of the Red Guards was the former Russian Army lieutenant Ali Aaltonen, who was elected during the general strike in November 1917. As the Civil War started, the task was given to Eero Haapalainen, with the Russian colonel Mikhail Svechnikov as his military advisor from the end of February. Haapalainen was expelled on 20 March and replaced by Eino Rahja, Adolf Taimi and Evert Eloranta. The troika stayed at the office until 10 April, when Kullervo Manner was given the dictator's rights as head of the Red Government and the Red Guards. August Wesley served as the chief of the Red Guards general staff from 16 February to 6 April. On 25 April, Manner fled to Soviet Russia, and for the last ten days of the war, there was no commander-in-chief. The final major battle was fought in Viipuri under the command of Edvard Gylling and Oskar Rantala.

=== Size ===
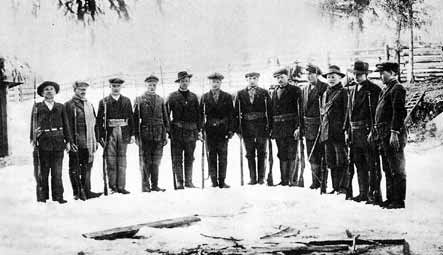
A Red Guard unit from Pukkila.

Due to incomplete and destroyed records, the exact number of men who served in the Red Guards is unknown. Historians provide estimates between 80,000 and 100,000 men. As the war started, the number was about 40,000, but by the end of the war, the total strength rose to 80,000–100,000 men and women, including 2,600 female fighters and thousands of women in the unarmed maintenance units. Approximately 40,000 were at the front at any one time. The largest single unit was the Helsinki Red Guard with a strength of 8,000–10,000 men and women. Other major units were the Red Guards of Tampere and Viipuri and the Saint Petersburg Finnish Red Guard. The Female Guards had about 2,000–2,600 members. Russian participation remained low, although 40,000 soldiers of the Imperial Russian Army and the Baltic Fleet were still in Finland. Only a few hundred joined the Red Guards, including a few dozen officers. Most of the Russian troops simply wanted to leave the country and return home. In addition to the Finland-based troops, the Saint Petersburg Bolsheviks supported the Reds in some battles on the Karelian Front.

=== Organization ===
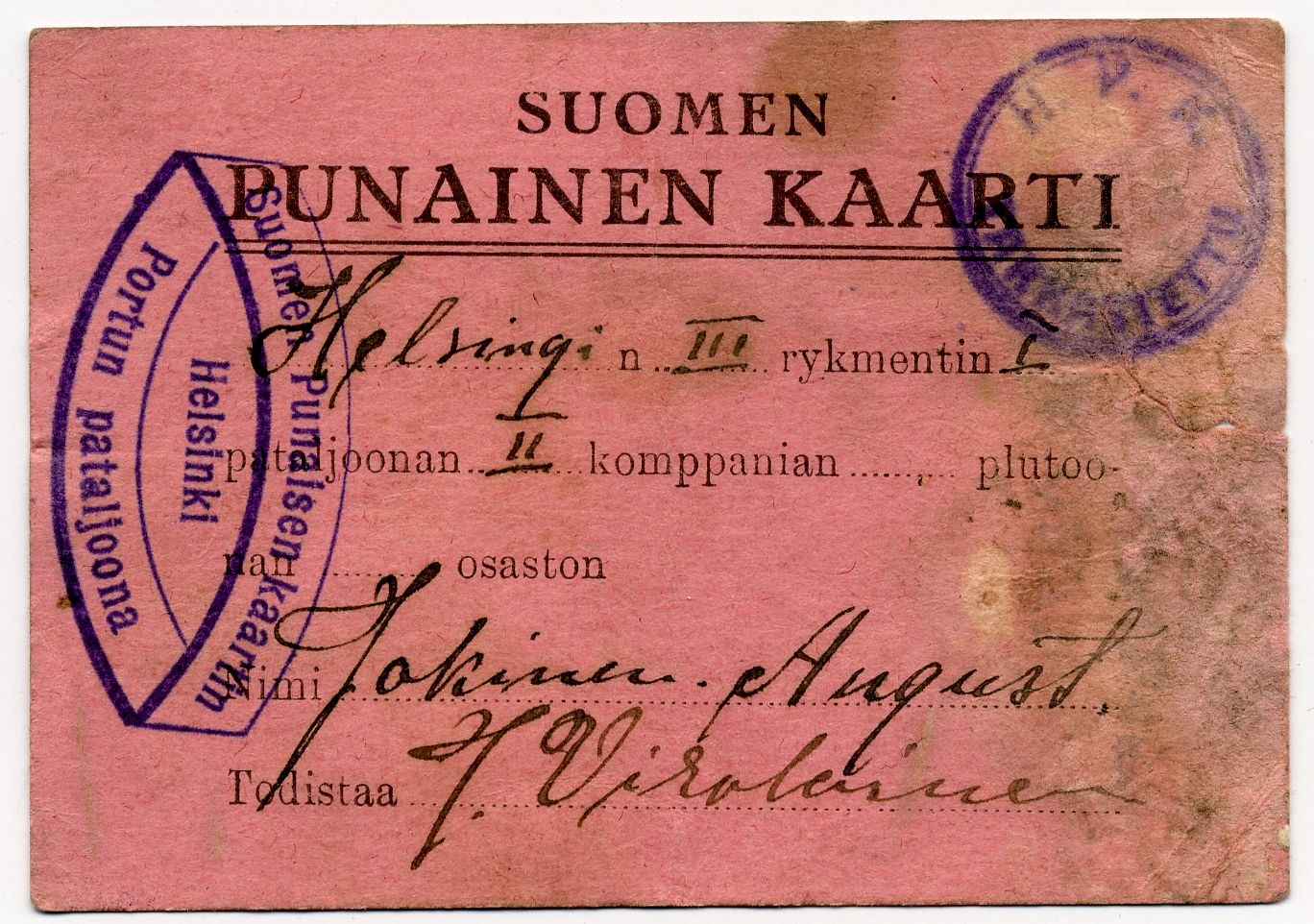
ID card of August Jokinen, 3rd regiment 1st battalion 2nd company of the Helsinki Red Guard.

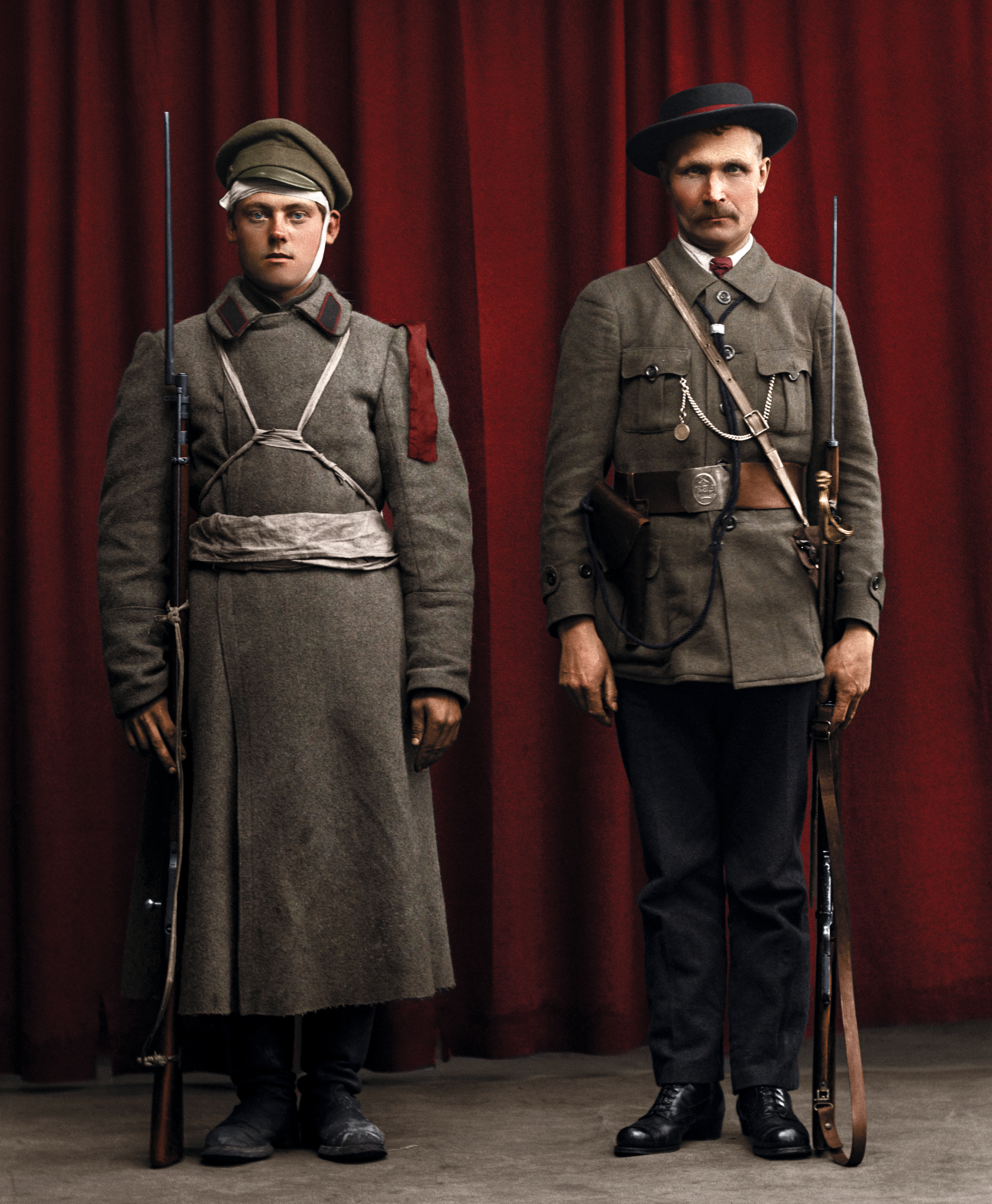
Two Finnish Red Guards in a Helsinki photography studio

The Red Guards were composed of industrial workers, landless rural workers and crofters. Most of them were members of the Finnish Trade Union Federation. The number of middle-class people was very small. The average age was between 20 and 30, the youngest fighters were only 15 to 16-years-old. The Red military units consisted of infantry, artillery and a small unit of cavalry. Weapons and other equipment were mostly received from the Russian troops. In the beginning of February, a train commanded by Jukka Rahja arrived from Saint Petersburg, carrying a cargo of 15,000 rifles, machine-guns, artillery pieces and 2 million cartridges, which the commander-in-chief Ali Aaltonen had purchased from the Bolsheviks. The Reds also had six armoured trains and a couple of aeroplanes which were flown by Russian pilots.

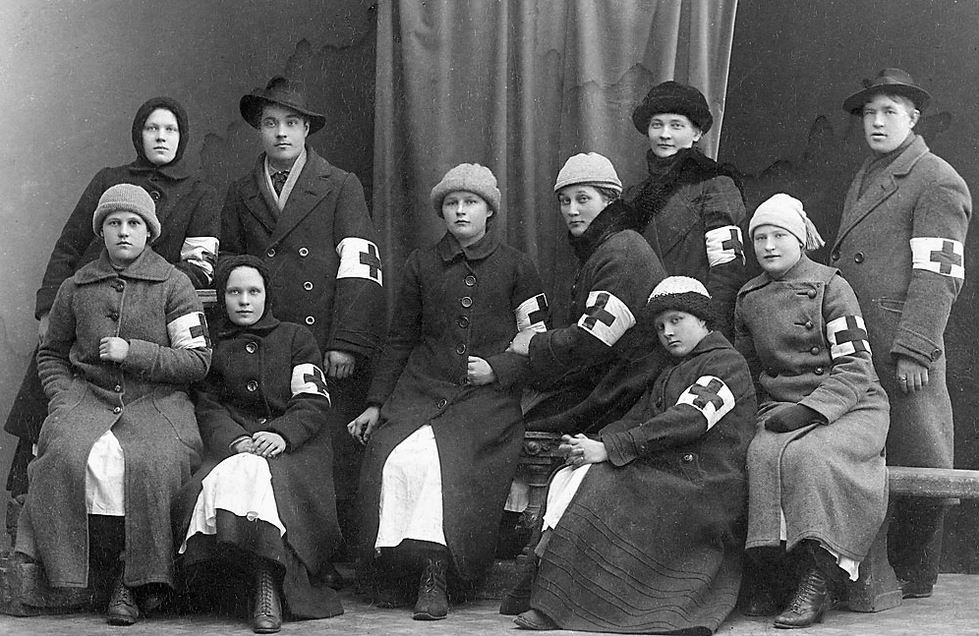
Medical unit of the Pispala Red Guard.

The general staff was located in Helsinki, with major subordinate staffs in Tampere and Viipuri. The infantry was divided into regiments and battalions but in practice, the largest commanded units were companies. A Red Guard company usually consisted of the men of some trade union local. For example, the Helsinki Red Guard had units composed of shoemakers, tailors, blacksmiths, sheet metal workers, plumbers, stonemasons and so on. Also some working-class sporting clubs formed their own squads. In the rural areas, the units were assembled by the men of the same locality. The Red Guard fighters received a salary that was sometimes even bigger than what they were paid for their usual work. As there was high unemployment, money was one of the reasons for joining the guards. Very few Reds had any kind of military background. The ones who had served in the Russian Imperial Army were usually voted as company leaders. The Red Guard fighters had a short military training before they were sent to the front line. The battles were usually fought like an ordinary working day. The fighting begun at the dawn and as the Sun set, the men returned to the base. On the Tavastia Front, some troops even spent the nights in Tampere, returning to the front by train in the morning.

The Red Guards' major problems were a lack of equipment, poor leadership and training, and food shortages at the front. The practice of electing officers democratically made discipline lax. Sometimes this led to a general unwillingness to go on offensive operations or to operate outside their local areas. The Red Guards did not have a clear command structure. Local commanders developed plans of their own, which did not always coincide with the ones composed by general staff in Helsinki. As there were very few trained officers, battlefield tactics had to be kept basic.

=== War ===
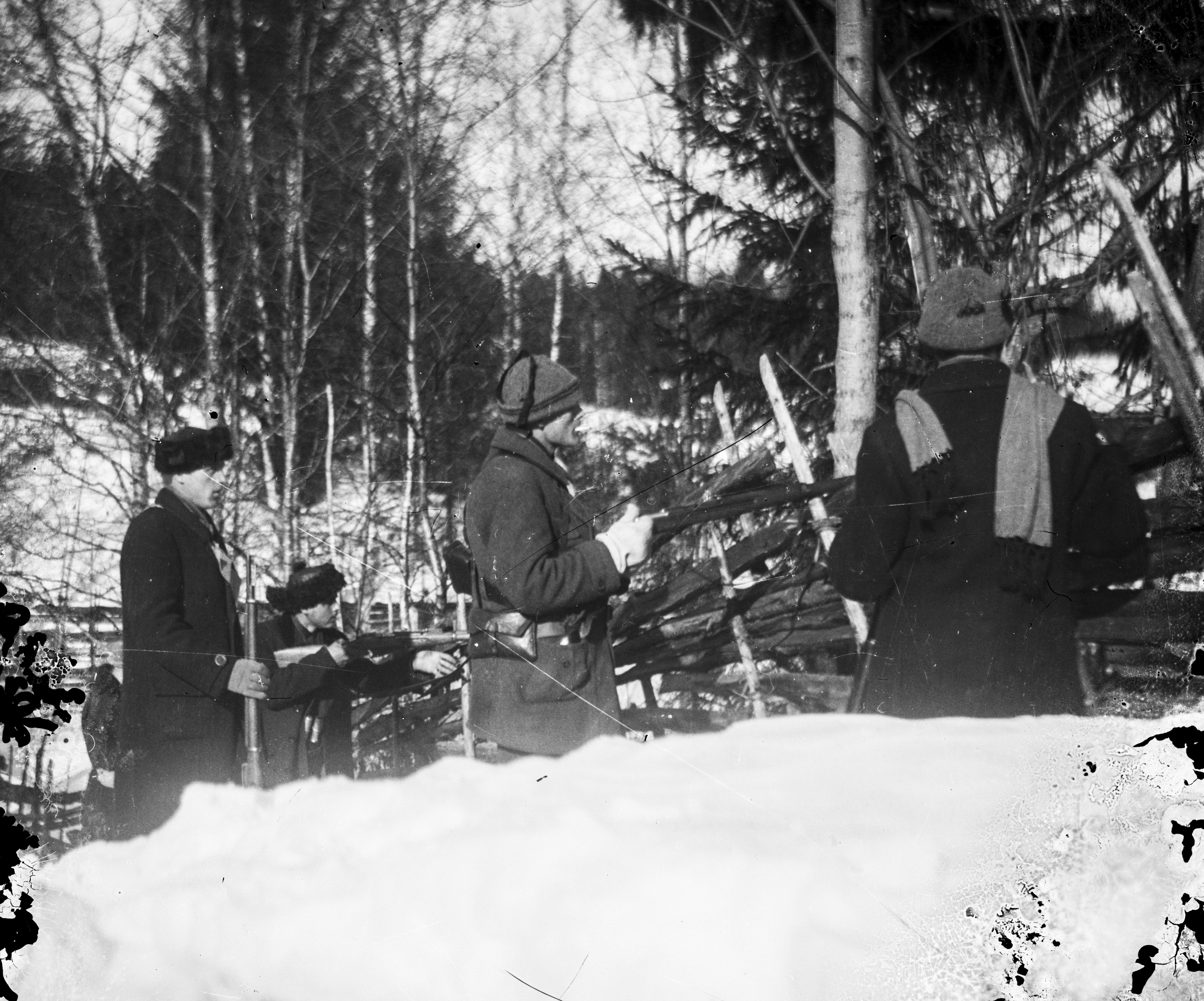
Red Guard fighters in Ruovesi.

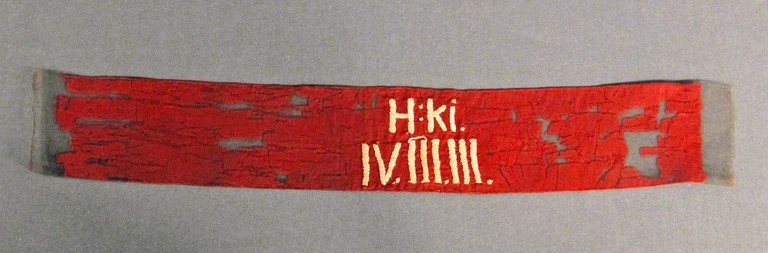
Armband of the 4th regiment 3rd battalion 3rd company of the Helsinki Red Guard.

As the war started on 27 January, the Red Guards occupied the capital, Helsinki, and the largest towns of industrialized southern Finland. The front line was soon established, stretching from the Gulf of Bothnia to the Karelian Isthmus, 30–50 kilometres north of Pori, Tampere, Lahti, Lappeenranta and Viipuri. The Whites occupied rural northern Finland, where the few Red strongholds fell in less than two weeks without any strong resistance. The last Red occupied town in the north was Varkaus, which the Whites seized on 21 February. In the Ostrobothnia, Central Finland, Savonia and North Karelia regions most Reds were captured, but in Lapland many were able to flee to Sweden, Norway or Soviet Russia.

The Red military operations were divided into three major theaters: the Western Front (Satakunta and Häme provinces), the Middle Front (Savo province) and the Eastern Front (the Viipuri province). The northernmost area of the Western Front, located north of Tampere, was often known as the Northern Front. The Red Guard general staff worked in Helsinki, with major subordinate staffs in Tampere and Viipuri. As a major railway junction, Lahti was also an important town for the Red military. A large number of units were organized and trained there before they were sent to the eastern fronts in Savo and Karelia.

The Reds launched three major offensives; in the beginning of February, 21 February and 10 March. The goal was to take the east–west railways connecting Ostrobothnia, Savonia and Karelia. From there the Reds could strike at the strongest White strongholds as well as the White capital of Vaasa. However, the offensives failed and the front line remained in the same position from early February to mid-March.

On 15 March, the Whites launched their major offensive against the Reds in the northern Häme where the Red front collapsed in a couple of days. The Whites were now able to besiege Tampere, militarily the most important Red town. The Battle of Tampere was fought from 23 March to 6 April. It was the fiercest battle of the Finnish Civil War, and at the time, also the largest urban battle in the world. The Battle of Tampere ended with mass executions of surrendering Reds, of whom 10,000–11,000 were captured, and thousands fled the surrounding areas.

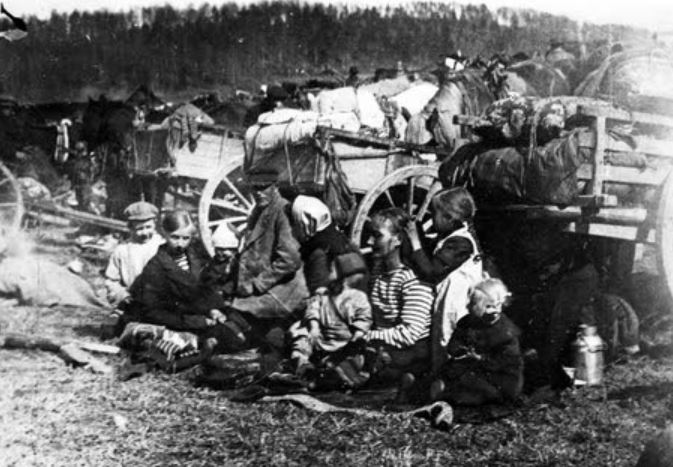
A refugee family captured in Lahti.

At the same time, German troops landed on the south coast of Finland and launched their campaign to support the Whites. On 6 April, the Red Government and the Red Guard general staff left Helsinki for Viipuri. The Red units in the western provinces of Satakunta and Finland Proper were given the order to retreat to eastern Finland. The intention was to re-organize the troops behind the river Kymijoki, but the plan was never realized. Instead, the order caused a mass exodus of refugees as tens of thousands of Red Guard fighters, their family members and other Red supporters fled towards the east.

As the Germans seized Helsinki on 13 April, up to 8,000 local Reds surrendered. Thousands of others from the Uusimaa province joined the refugee column that was coming from the west. In two weeks, more than 100,000 Red refugees headed east, in order to flee to Soviet Russia. About 12,000 managed to cross the border, while most of the remaining were captured. In late April, up to 30,000 civilians and Red fighters fell into the hands of the German and White troops in Lahti. The captured were first placed at the Fellman camp, and then transferred to various prison camps across southern Finland. Although most of the women and children were released, 200–600 Red women were executed and hundreds of others moved into other prison camps. The last major battle took place in Viipuri, which the Whites occupied on 29 April. The last remaining Red stronghold was in the Kymenlaakso province where the Reds finally surrendered to the Germans on 6 May.

Between 23 March and 18 April, some clashes also occurred in the remote eastern Lapland. The Karelian nationalist Iivo Ahava was fighting against the Whites who launched the Viena expedition in order to annex the Russian White Karelia into the newly independent Finland. Ahava formed a Red Guard unit in the Russian town of Kandalaksha of the Reds who had fled from Lapland. Two other Finnish Red Guards were formed in Knyazhaya Guba and Kem. In mid-March, these units comprised up to 2,500 men. Ahava managed to stop the Whites and he was also eager to attack their rear in the northern Finland. However, the Red leaders were not interested in supporting him as they considered that the war would be determined in the populated areas of south.

== After the war ==
A substantial number of Finnish Red Guards managed to retreat into Russian-held territories after the Whites' victory in Finland. Many of those who fled to Russia were reorganized into new fighting units and participated in the Russian Civil War and, by extension, World War I. The United Kingdom organized the Murmansk Legion from Red Guard refugees as part of the North Russia Intervention of the Allies. The British hoped to use the Murmansk Legion to fight off the Viena expedition of the Germany-aligned White Finns into East Karelia. Red Guard units served in the 7th Red Army when it fought in the Estonian War of Independence. There, the Finnish Reds clashed with Finnish White volunteers fighting for the Republic of Estonia.

In 1922, some Red Guards crossed into northern Finland from the Soviet Union and launched the Pork Mutiny. The Red Guards disarmed and robbed border guards and workplaces and recruited new members, and crossed back into the Soviet Union five days later, before further Finnish forces arrived.

== See also ==
- Female Red Guards of the Finnish Civil War
- Finnish Socialist Workers' Republic
- Red Guard's March
- Political terror in Finland and Baltic States after World War I
