= JRL =

JRL may refer to:

- Japan national rugby league team
- Java Research License, a software distribution license
- Johnson's Russia List, an email newsletter
- Juan Ramón Loubriel Stadium, in Bayamón, Puerto Rico
- Jurong Region Line, a future subway line in Singapore
