= Timothy Colton =

American political scientist and historian

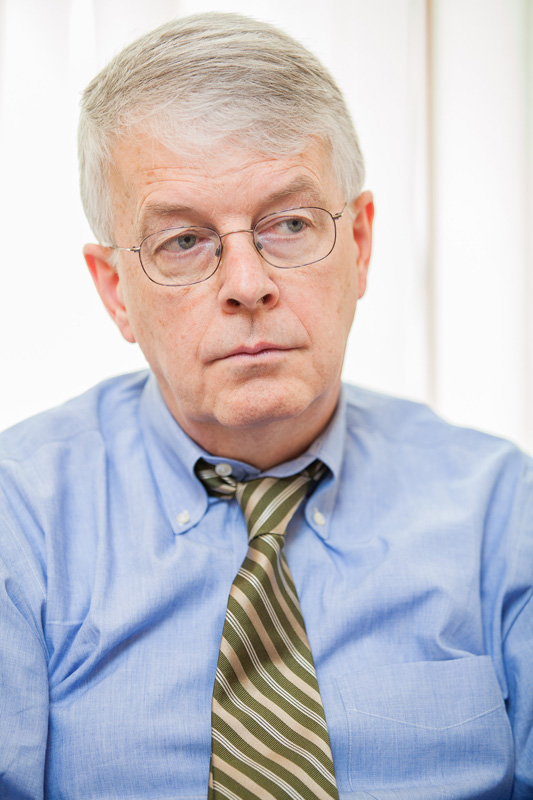
- Born: July 14, 1947 (age 79); Timmins, Ontario
- Occupations: Professor, historian, political scientist

Academic background
- Education: Harvard University, PhD, 1974

Academic work
- Institutions: Harvard University
- Doctoral students: Daniel Treisman

Timothy James Colton (born July 14, 1947) is a Canadian-American political scientist and historian currently serving as the chair of The Harvard Academy for International and Area Studies, housed at the Weatherhead Center for International Affairs at Harvard University. Dr. Colton is the Morris and Anna Feldberg Professor of Government and Russian Studies. His academic work and interests are in Russian and post-Soviet politics. He is currently an editorial board member for World Politics and Post-Soviet Affairs. He has been a fellow of the American Academy of Arts and Sciences since 2011. He is the brother of former CBC Radio Washington, D.C. correspondent, Michael Colton.

== Career ==
Colton was previously the director of the Davis Center for Russian and Eurasian Studies and chair of the Department of Government at Harvard. He was previously a fellow at the Woodrow Wilson International Center for Scholars and vice chairman of the National Council for East European, Russian, and Eurasian Research.

Colton published The Dilemma of Reform in the Soviet Union in 1984, which dealt with the political and economic situation in Russia after the death of Konstantin Chernenko and rise of Mikhail Gorbachev. The book predicted that the tenure of Gorbachev would result in either moderate reform or increasingly conservative policy. A revised and expanded version was published in 1987. In 1995, he published Moscow: Governing the Socialist Metropolis, which was awarded the best scholarly book in government and political science by the Association of American Publishers.

In 2000, he published Transitional Citizens: Voters and What Influences Them in the New Russia, which presented a model for Russian voting patterns based on previously conducted studies. The book was noted for its systematic approach to Russian politics.

In 2008, he published Yeltsin: A life, which re-examined the reputation and legacy of Russian president Boris Yeltsin. The book received mostly positive reviews, which praised its writing and insight into the life and political career of Yeltsin. Luke March, in a review for Europe-Asia Studies, compared the book to Leon Aron's Yeltsin: A Revolutionary Life, finding Colton's arguments to be more "balanced and concise." Political scientist Peter Reddaway, writing for Johnson's Russia List, felt the book had "outstanding merits on the psychological side" but that the book showed Yeltsin in a good light. Jonathan Steele of The Guardian gave a similar review, saying that he felt Colton sided with Yeltsin on most events and backed the book "by a tremendous amount of research."

In 2016, he published Russia: What Everyone Needs to Know, which is an overview of the political history of the Russian Federation. Rose Deller, writing for the London School of Economics blog, praised the book for its readability, in-depth analysis and "refreshing" approach to Russian politics. This book was followed by the 2017 book Everyone Loses: The Ukraine Crisis and the Ruinous Contest for Post-Soviet Eurasia, which is an overview of the Russo-Ukrainian war. In East/West: Journal of Ukrainian Studies, Wolfgang Mueller called its claims regarding the origins of the war "quite simplistic", and wrote that "the authors pay tribute to the official Russian reading" by describing Euromaidan as a "violent overthrow". On the contrary, Andrei Tsygankov of Slavic Review stated that it was a balanced overview of the events.

== Bibliography ==
- Everyone Loses: The Ukraine Crisis and the Ruinous Contest for Post-Soviet Eurasia. Routledge, International Institute for Strategic Studies. (with Samuel Charap, 2017)
- Russia: What Everyone Needs to Know. Oxford University Press. (2016)
- Yeltsin: A life. Basic Books. (2008)
- Popular Choice and Managed Democracy: The Russian Elections of 1999 and 2000. Brookings Institution Press. (with Michael McFaul, 2003)
- Transitional Citizens: Voters and What Influences Them in the New Russia. Harvard University Press. (2000)
- Moscow: Governing the Socialist Metropolis. Harvard University Press. (1995)
- The Dilemma of Reform in the Soviet Union. New York Council on Foreign Relations. (1984)
