= Annenkrone =

Fortress in Vyborg

Coordinates: 60.718559°N 28.724248°E

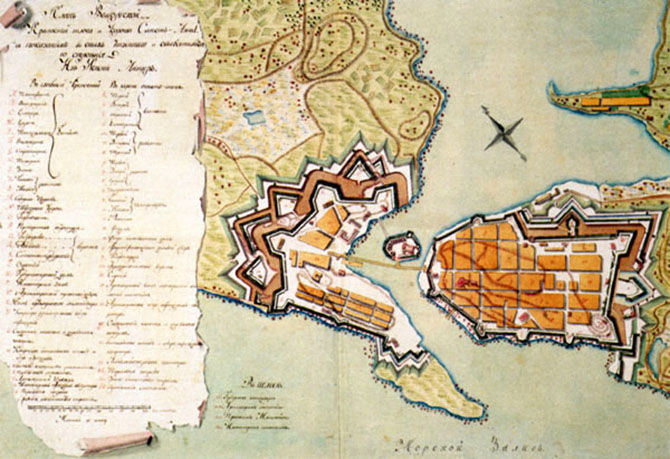
Annenkrone (left), Vyborg Castle (middle) and the town of Vyborg (right)

Annenkrone (St Anne's Crown, Russian: Анненские укрепления, tr. Annenskiye ukrepleniya, Finnish: Pyhän Annan kruunu) is an early 18th century fortification in Vyborg, Russia. It is located outside the town in the island of Tverdysh.

== History ==
The construction was started by Peter the Great in 1720, after Russia had successfully finished the Siege of Vyborg and captured the town from Sweden in the Great Northern War. The fortification was completed by Anna of Russia in 1741. The project was under the direction of the German-born soldier-engineer Burkhard Christoph von Münnich.

Annenkrone is composed of four bastions and three ravelins facing west and one moat on the north side. The fortification was never used in war. After the Finnish War of 1808–1809 Annenkrone lost its significance as Finland became a part of the Russian Empire and the border against Sweden was transferred hundreds of kilometres west. The last barracks and other buildings were completed in the mid-19th century.

Today the fortification is a part of the Petrovsky District. During the Finnish era 1917–1944 it was a part of the Siikaniemi district.

After the 1918 Finnish Civil War Battle of Vyborg, a mass execution was conducted in Annenkrone as the Whites shot up to 400 Russian civilians in the so-called Vyborg massacre.

== Gallery ==
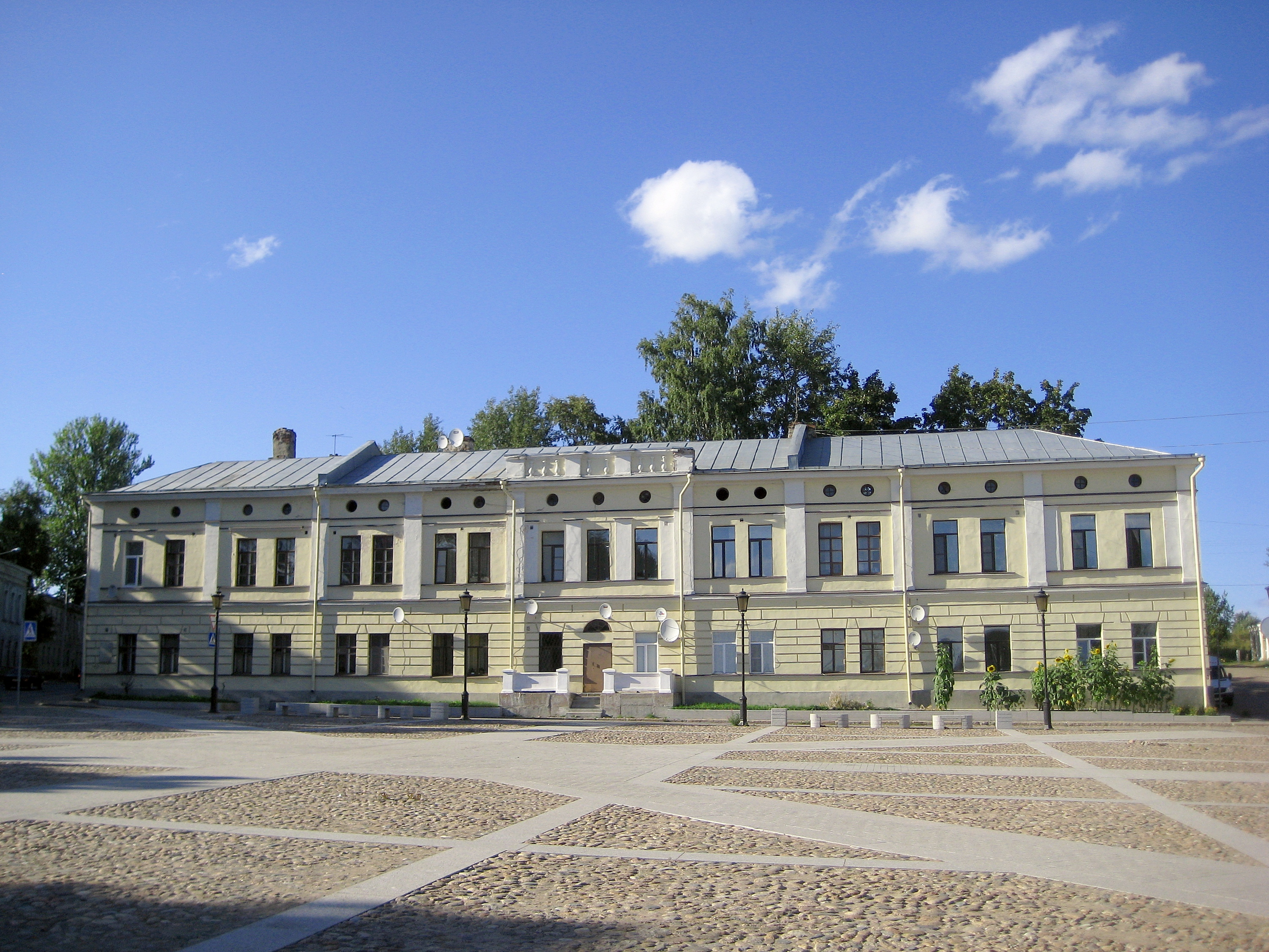
The Mendt House (1847) at the Petrovskaya Square

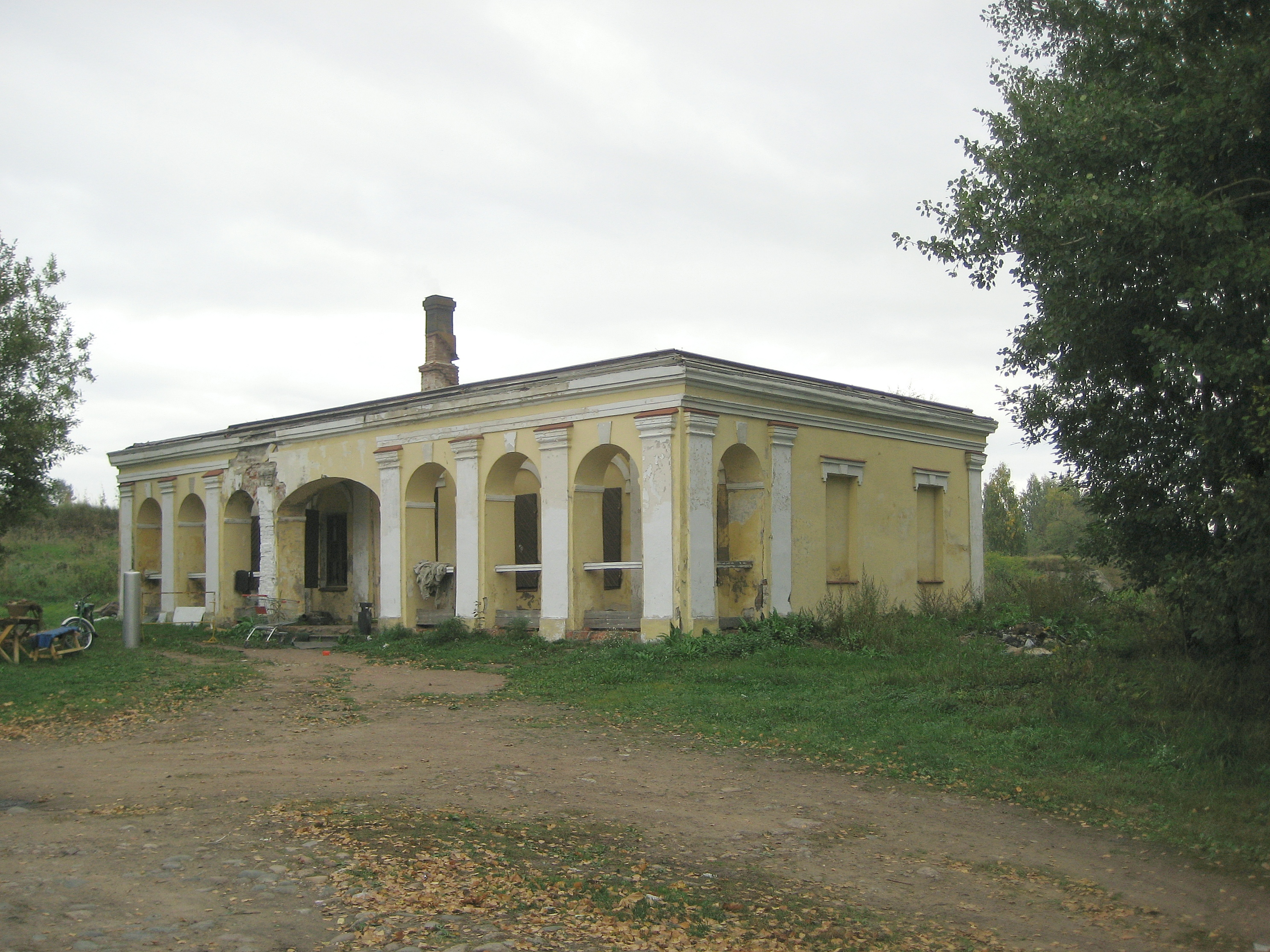
Guardhouse (1776)

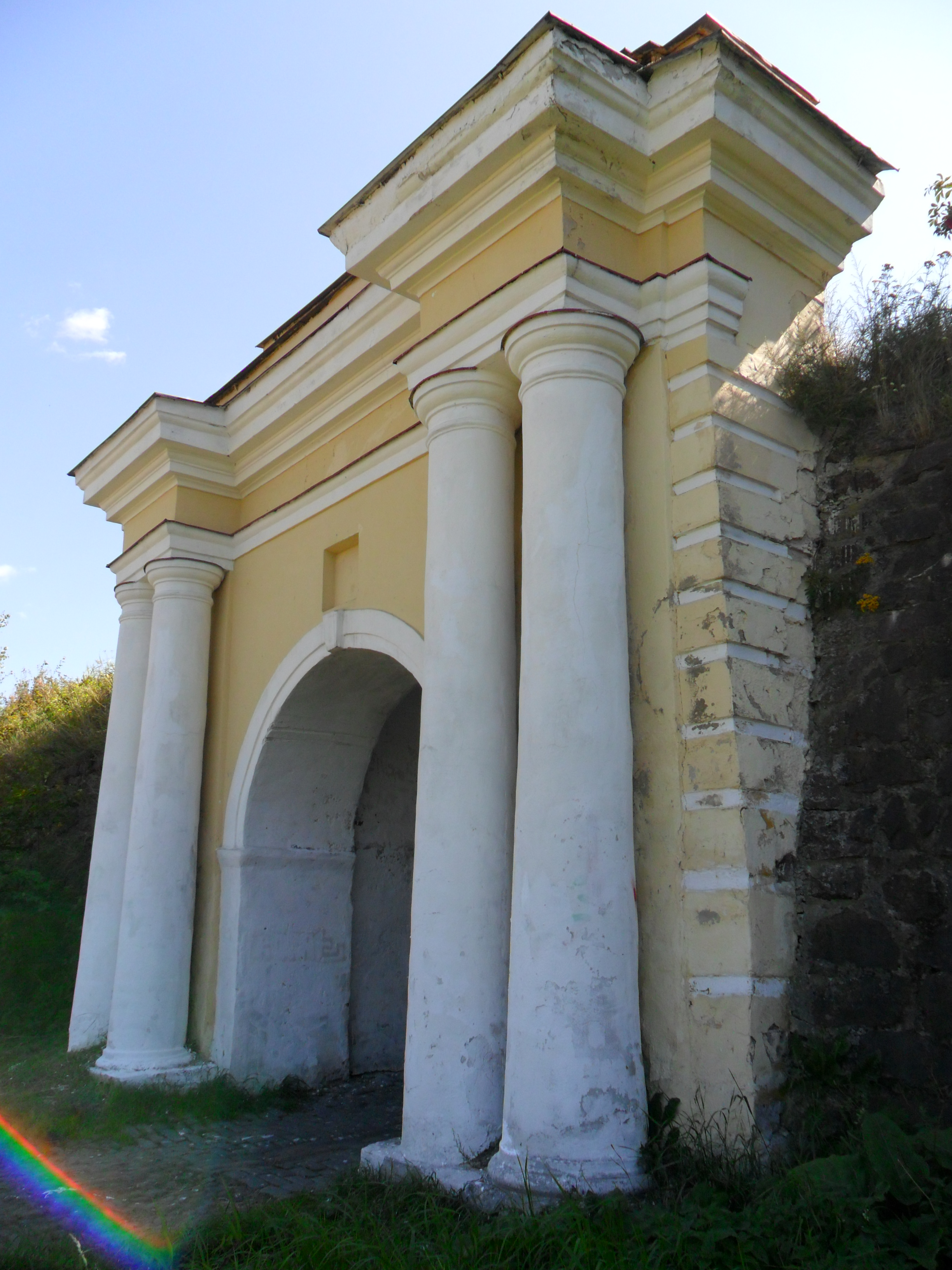
Fredrikshamn Gate

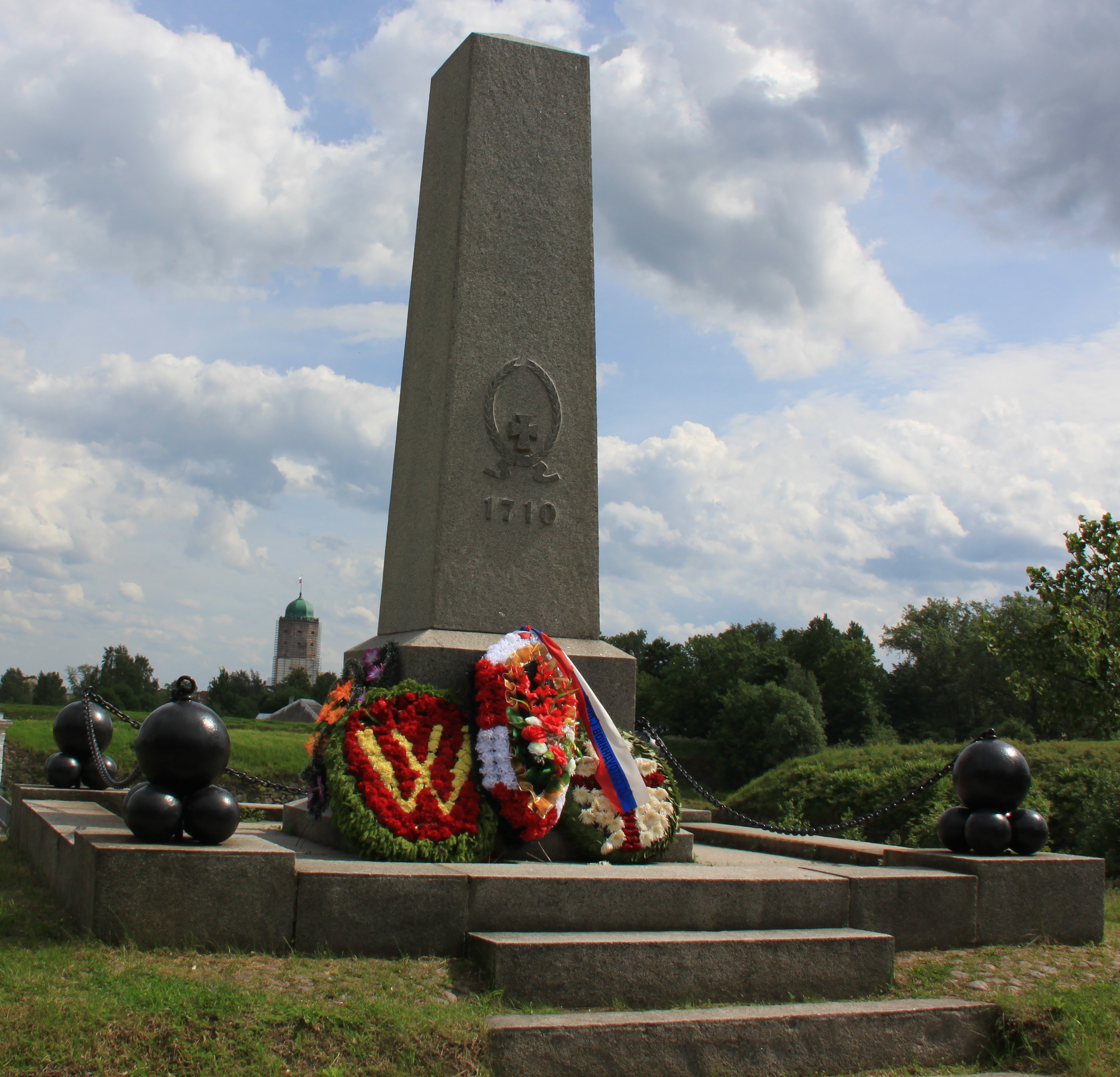
Memorial of the Siege of Vyborg

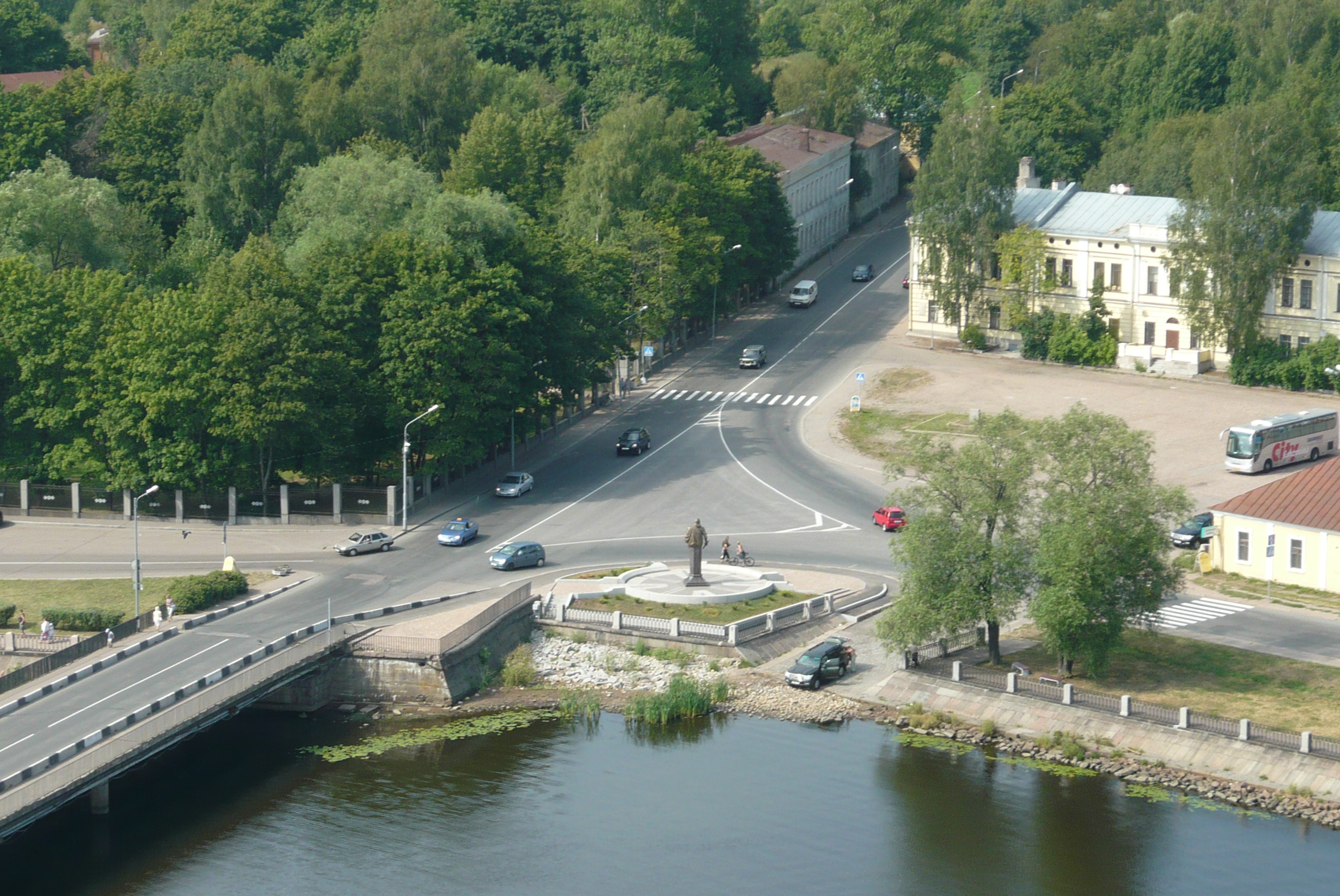
Petrovskaya Square and the statue of admiral Fyodor Apraksin
