= Krystyna Kurczab-Redlich =

Polish journalist and author (born 1954)

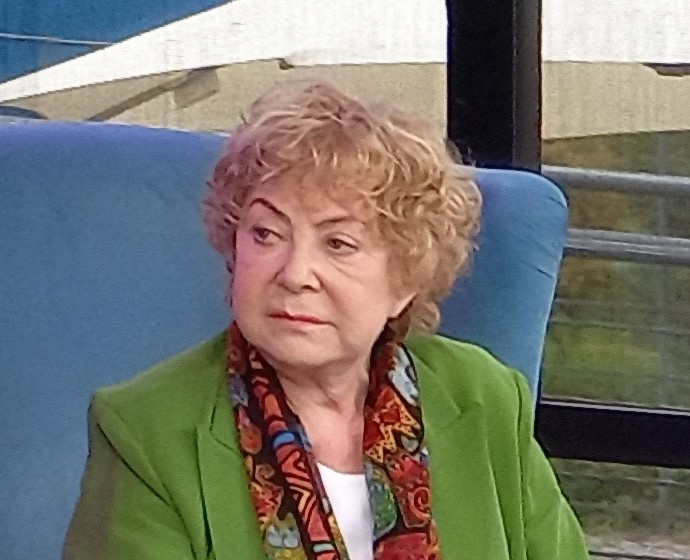
- Krystyna Kurczab-Redlich in Opole (2022)
- Born: December 6, 1954; Zabrze
- Citizenship: Polish
- Education: Jagiellonian University
- Occupation: journalist

Krystyna Kurczab-Redlich (born 6 December 1954 in Zabrze) is a Polish journalist and author.

As a correspondent in Russia for the Polish media, she has written documentary films on Chechnya investigating alleged human rights abuses by the Russian army. In 2000 she published Pandrioszka, an account of life in contemporary Russia. Her 2007 book Głową o mur Kremla ("Banging one's head against the wall of the Kremlin"), a history of Russia from the 1980s to the present, earned her the nickname the Polish Politkovskaya (Polska Politkowska).

Kurczab-Redlich received the Kazimierz Dziewanowski Award for her work as a foreign correspondent and the Melchior Wańkowicz Award for her reports from Chechnya. In 2005 the Chechen organization Echo of War, along with Amnesty International and the Helsinki Foundation for Human Rights, nominated her for the Nobel Peace Prize.

== Publications ==
- 2000 – Pandrioshka, Rebis Publishing House
- 2007 – Head against the Kremlin wall, W.A.B. Publishing House
- 2012 – Head against the Kremlin wall. New Facts, W.A.B. Publishing House, Terra Incognita series
- 2016 – Vova, Volodya, Vladimir. Secrets of Putin's Russia, W.A.B. Publishing House
