= Blood red =

Color which represents human blood

Blood
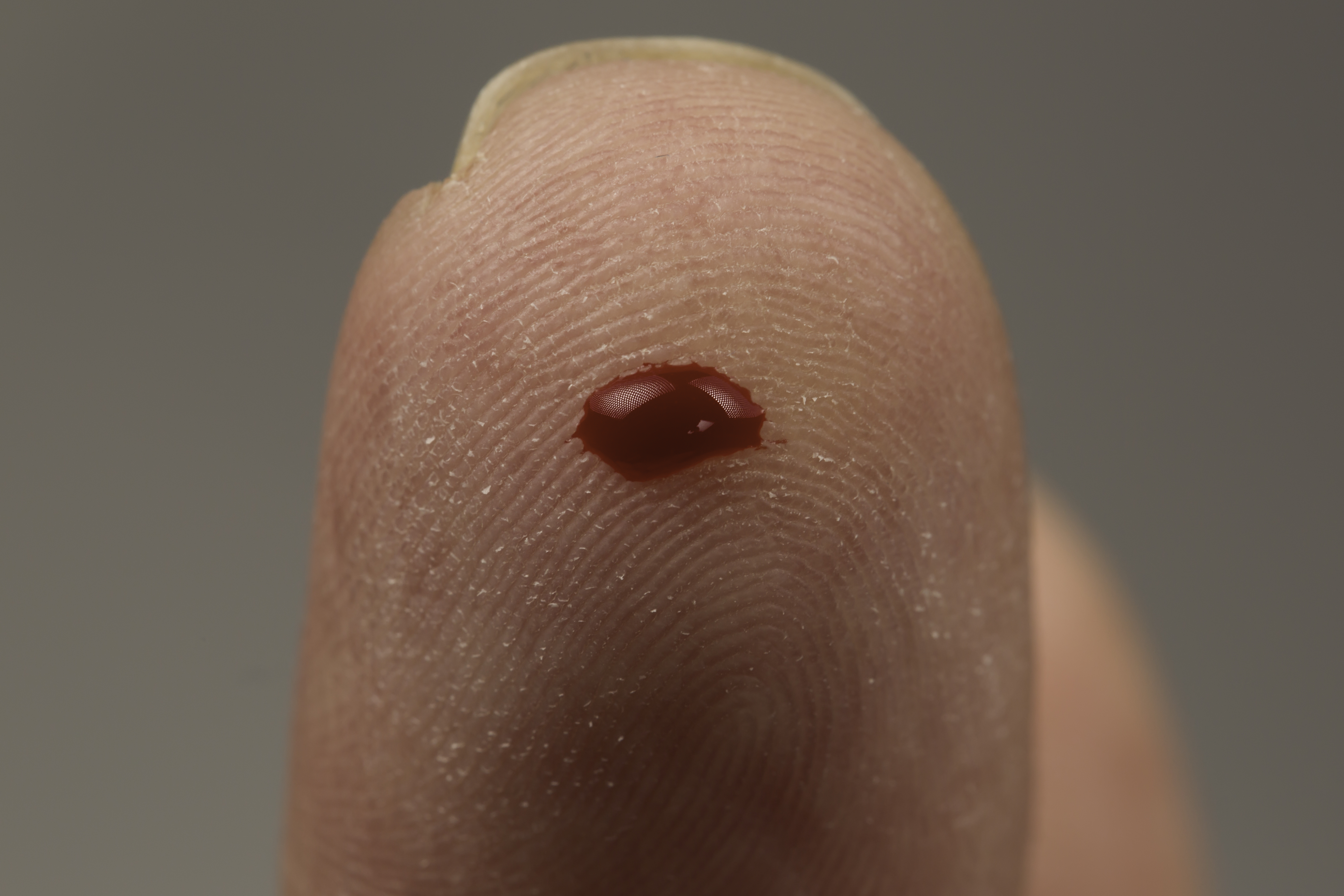

Color coordinates
- Hex triplet: #660000
- sRGB^{B} (r, g, b): (102, 0, 0)
- HSV (h, s, v): (0°, 100%, 40%)
- CIELCh_{uv} (L, C, h): (19, 65, 12°)
- Source: Thom Poole's 2017 book Life of Colour
- ISCC–NBS descriptor: Deep reddish brown
- B: Normalized to [0–255] (byte)

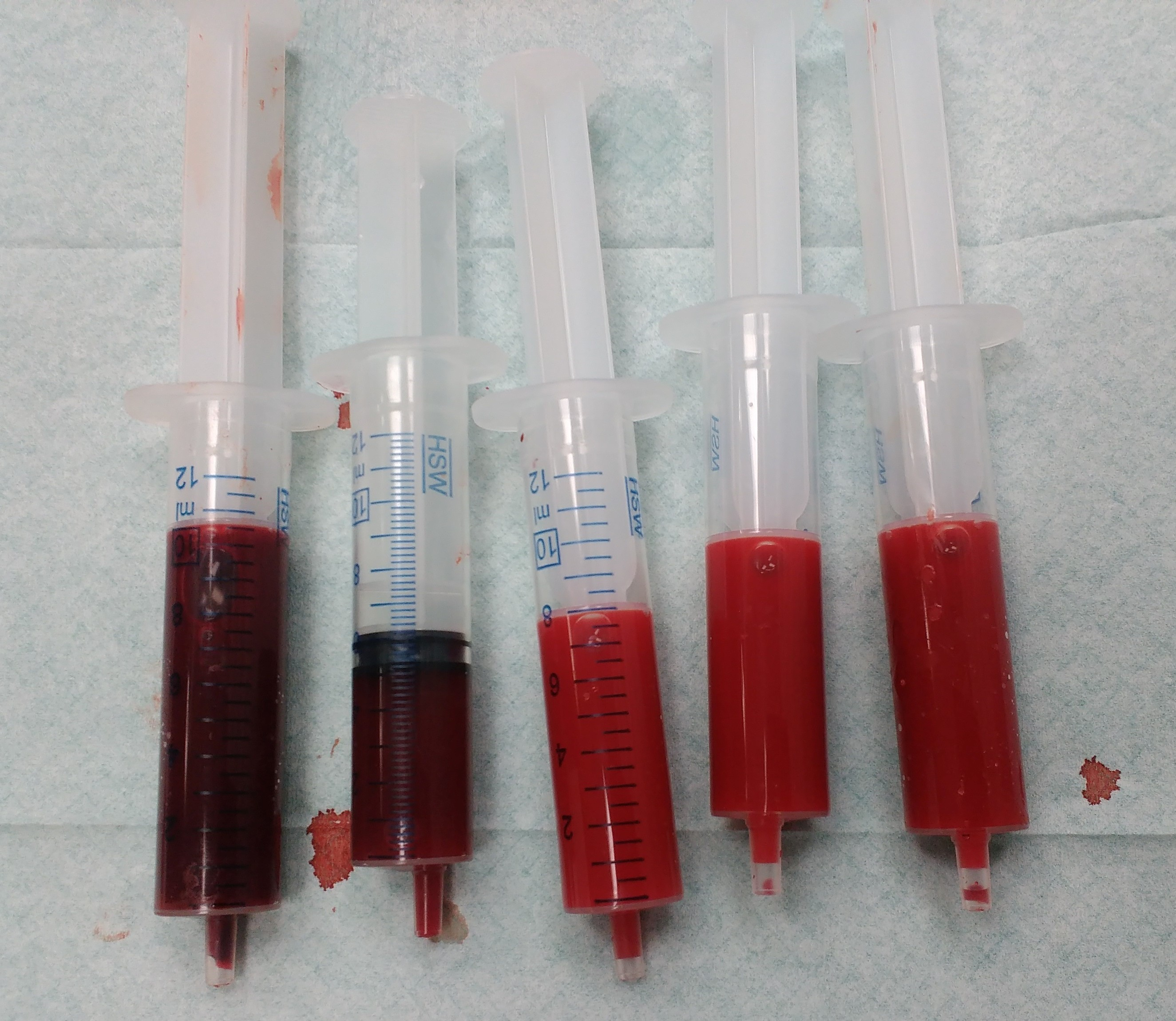
Difference in hue between venous (darker/blackish red) blood and arterial (brighter/carmine red) blood

The colour blood red is a dark shade of the colour red meant to resemble the colour of human blood (which is composed of oxygenated red erythrocytes, white leukocytes, and yellow blood plasma). It is the iron in hemoglobin specifically that gives blood its red colour. The actual colour ranges from crimson to a dark brown-blood depending on how oxygenated the blood is, and may have a slightly orange hue.

Deoxygenated blood, which circulates closer to the body's surface and which is therefore generally more likely to be seen than oxygenated blood, issues from bodily veins in a dark red state, but quickly oxygenates upon exposure to air, turning a brighter shade of red. This happens more quickly with smaller volumes of blood such as a pinprick and less quickly from cuts or punctures that cause greater blood flows such as a puncture in the basilic vein: all blood collected during a phlebotomy procedure is deoxygenated blood (ie, blackish red in color), and it does not usually have a chance to become oxygenated upon leaving the body. Deoxygenated blood is sometimes misconstrued as being blue.

Arterial blood, which is already oxygenated, is also already a brighter shade of red— this is the blood seen from a pulsating neck, arm, or leg wound, and it does not change colour upon exposure to air. The colour "blood red", therefore, covers both these states: the darker deoxygenated colour and the brighter oxygenated one. Also, dried blood often has a darker, rust-coloured quality: all dried blood has been oxygenated and then desiccated, causing the cells within it to die. This blood is often darker than either shade of red that can be seen in fresh blood.

In the RGB colour spectrum blood red often consists only of the colour red, with no green or blue component; in the CYMK colour model blood red has no cyan, and consists only of magenta and yellow with a small amount of black. It is frequently darker than either maroon or dark red.

== Variants ==
Different sources have proposed different color schemes for the color blood red. Below are some of these.

Blood red

Color coordinates
- Hex triplet: #880808
- sRGB^{B} (r, g, b): (136, 8, 8)
- HSV (h, s, v): (0°, 94%, 53%)
- CIELCh_{uv} (L, C, h): (28, 89, 12°)
- Source: HTML Color Codes
- B: Normalized to [0–255] (byte)

Blood red

Color coordinates
- Hex triplet: #AA0000
- sRGB^{B} (r, g, b): (170, 0, 0)
- HSV (h, s, v): (0°, 100%, 67%)
- CIELCh_{uv} (L, C, h): (35, 118, 12°)
- ISCC–NBS descriptor: Vivid red
- B: Normalized to [0–255] (byte)

Blood red

Color coordinates
- Hex triplet: #AF111C
- sRGB^{B} (r, g, b): (175, 17, 28)
- HSV (h, s, v): (356°, 90%, 69%)
- CIELCh_{uv} (L, C, h): (37, 114, 11°)
- ISCC–NBS descriptor: Vivid red
- B: Normalized to [0–255] (byte)

Blood red

Color coordinates
- Hex triplet: #830303
- sRGB^{B} (r, g, b): (131, 3, 3)
- HSV (h, s, v): (0°, 98%, 51%)
- CIELCh_{uv} (L, C, h): (26, 87, 12°)
- ISCC–NBS descriptor: Deep reddish brown
- B: Normalized to [0–255] (byte)

Blood red

Color coordinates
- Hex triplet: #7E3517
- sRGB^{B} (r, g, b): (126, 53, 23)
- HSV (h, s, v): (17°, 82%, 49%)
- CIELCh_{uv} (L, C, h): (32, 61, 23°)
- ISCC–NBS descriptor: Strong reddish brown
- B: Normalized to [0–255] (byte)

== See also ==
- Oxblood
- Theatrical blood, which can come in a variety of colours (including shades not found in real blood)
