= Viipuri massacre =

Finnish Civil War mass killing of Russians

- Part of the Finnish Civil War
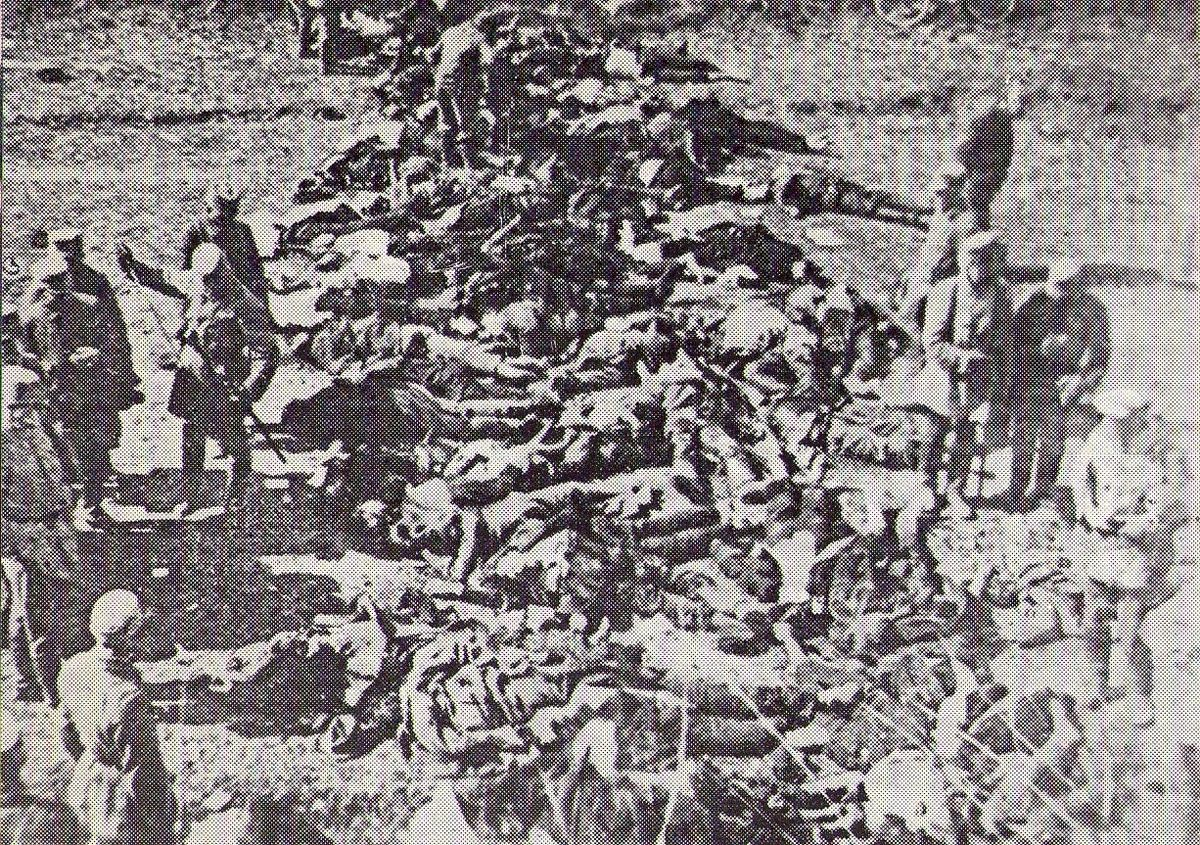
- Executed Russians at the Annenkrone Fortress
- Location: 60°43′N 28°46′E; Viipuri, Finland
- Date: 28 April 1918 – 3 May 1918
- Target: Red Guards, ethnic Russians
- Attack type: Military assault, mass murder
- Deaths: 360–420 Russians and other non-Finns
- Perpetrator: White Guards

The Viipuri massacre was the killing of approximately 360 to 420 Russians in the city of Viipuri (Swedish Viborg, now Vyborg, Russia) during the Finnish Civil War in April–May 1918. The massacre took place during and after the Battle of Viipuri as the White Guards captured the city from the Red Guards. At least half of the victims were Russian soldiers and military personnel. The slain were mainly men and young boys, as young as 12-13 years old: nine out of ten were men fit for military service, according to Finnish propaganda. The White Guards were "cleansing" the city of Red Guards of whom 800 were slain; however, only a small minority of the killed Russians were affiliated with the Finnish labour movement.

== Background ==
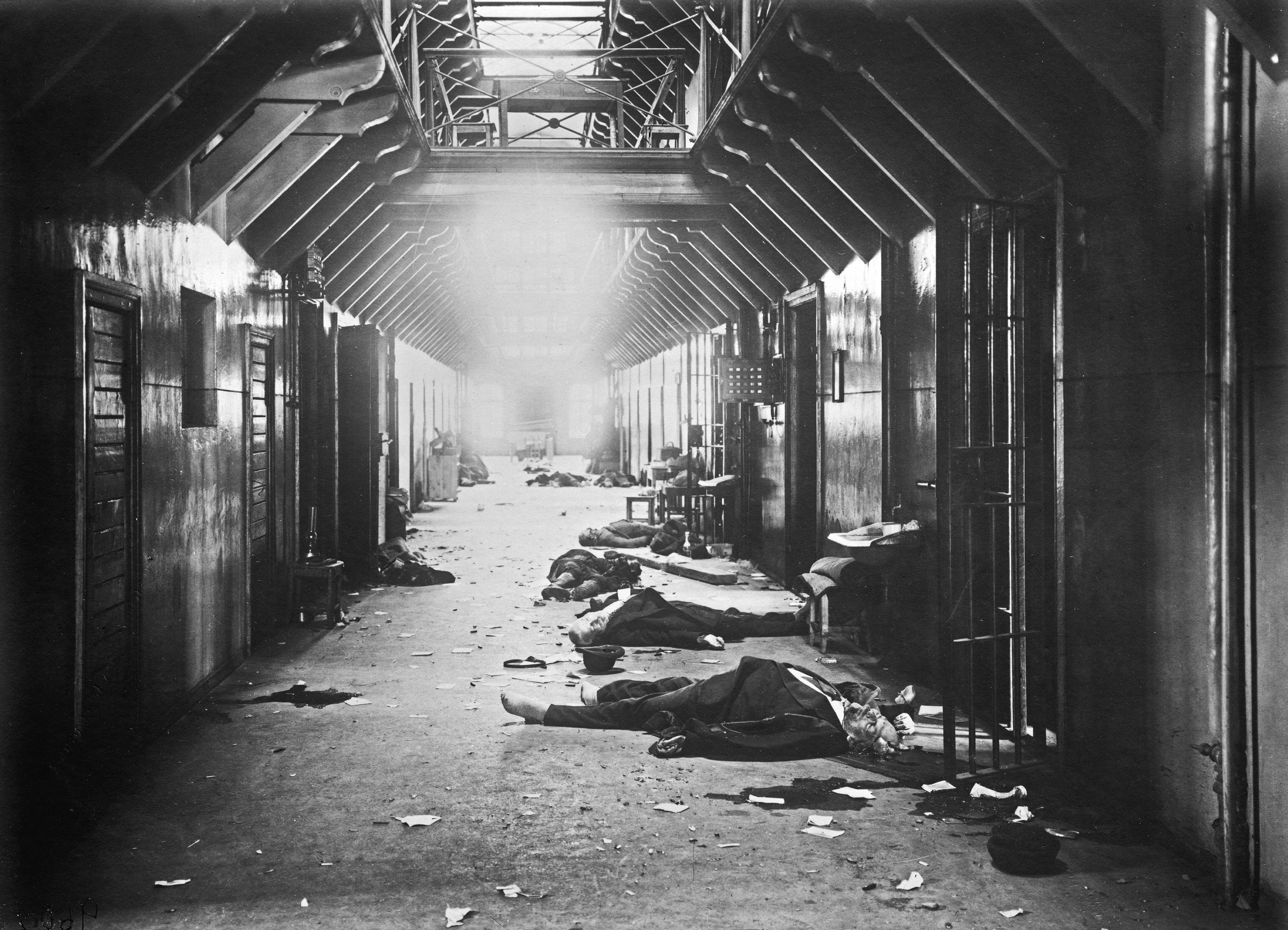
Red Terror in April 1918: the Viipuri county jail massacre, where 30 White prisoners were killed

Viipuri, Swedish Viborg, was both the second largest city in Finland with 49,000 inhabitants and one of the most diverse. In 1910, Viipuri had minorities of Finland Swedes (5,000) and Russians (3,200–4,000), as well as smaller ethnic groups of Germans, Jews and Islamic Tatars.

During the Finnish Civil War, the identification of Finnish Reds as ethnic Russians among the Whites became widespread, and anti-Russian sentiment may have been the most prevalent in western Finland, especially in the White stronghold of Ostrobothnia, leading to the manifestation of ethnic hatred that escalated into violence.

Historian Teemu Keskisarja considers a spark that set off the killings was the news that a gang of drunk Red Guards led by Hjalmar Kaipiainen (Kaipiainen was himself captured and executed on 23 May 1918) had entered Viborg County Gaol during the Battle of Viipuri and murdered 30 White Guard prisoners. Those of other ethnic origins were only killed because they were simply assumed to be Russians.

White Guard-associated newspapers spread the claim of Judeo-Bolshevism and a rumor spread among the White Guard that the Jews of Viipuri had aided the Red Guard, and a group of Jägers planned to round up and execute all the Jews living in the city. The plan was never executed in its planned extent, though a number of Jews were executed in the massacre.

== Killings ==
The massacre started on April 28 during the Battle of Viipuri, escalating on the next, final day of the battle. Westerlund notes descriptions by jaegers Nurmio and Grandell of difficulty of identifying the Reds, as they hid amongst the population. Street combat and sniper skirmishes colored the final day of the battle. The largest mass executions were committed at the Annenkrone fortification on the western side of the city and in the yard of Viipuri Castle, but mainly the killings took place randomly in the streets and yards. Some managed to survive as the Finnish or Swedish residents were hiding them.

Executions were committed by the Vaasa and Kajaani regiments, which were parts of the Eastern Army of the White Guards, led by the General Major Ernst Löfström. Vaasa Regiment was led by the Swedish military adventurer Martin Ekström, who later became a leader of the Swedish Nazi organization National Socialist Bloc. Both regiments were filled with men from other parts of Finland who were not from the Viipuri area. The local White Guards did not directly take part in the killings.

After Mannerheim heard about the massacres on May 2, he ordered an investigation and the punishments of the culprits. The next day on May 3 Rudolf Walden sent the following telegram from Mikkeli to G. A. Finne, the new city commandant: "Take the strongest actions to prevent violence towards innocent Polish, Ukrainians and Russians. Investigate each case."

Orders for conducting the executions were mainly given by the officers of the Jäger Movement. For example, the Jäger Major Harald Öhquist admitted that his company had shot some 150 "Red Ruskies", but did not mention who had given the order. After the war, General Karl Fredrik Wilkama was considered to be responsible for the massacre, but neither he nor anyone else was ever convicted or even charged in a court of law. Wilkama himself described the massacre as a "little accident".

On May 10 Löfström sent a telegram to headquarters requesting permission to distribute aid, especially monetary, to Russians who had suffered and had been robbed of personal property. Later on, more aid was given. Westerlund says that it is not possible to calculate the full amount from the surviving records, but states that the final sum was considerable.

== Victims ==
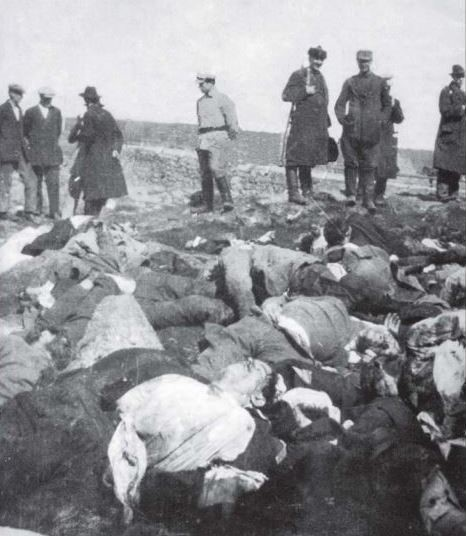
Victims of the massacre in the Annenkrone Fortress

Different estimations of the total number slain have taken place over the years. Soikkanen approximated the number at about 200, Tanskanen at 100, Upton at 50+, Russian newspapers noted by Vihavainen at 500-600, Rustanius and Jouni Eerola at 200, and lastly Jaru and Jouni Eerola at 350-550. Westerlund estimates the number at 360-420. Teemu Keskisarja estimates it at about 400.

37 of the slain were members of other ethnic groups living in Viipuri, including 23 Polish soldiers of the Imperial Russian Army, several Ukrainians, Estonians, Jews and Tatars, two Italians and one Baltic German. At least half of the murdered Russians were affiliated with the army. It is notable that they did not fight with the Reds, but were mostly unarmed. Only few of the victims had any connections with the Red Guards, most of them even supported the Whites and greeted them as liberators. The victims were of all social classes. Most of the killed Russian civilians were workers as well as administrators working for the City of Viipuri, merchants, businessmen or handicraftsmen, also several noblemen were executed. The youngest victims were only 12–13-year-old schoolboys. Two of the murdered teenagers were the 13 and 15-year-old sons of Lieutenant Colonel Georgi Bulatsel who was one of the highest ranked Russian officers fighting for the Reds. He had been executed after the Battle of Tampere on 28 April. There had been at least three women amongst the slain Russians. Not all caught Russian were slain, as there are numerous mentions of spared Russians in the committee records.

== Citations ==
Bibliography

- Westerlund, Lars (2004). "Me odotimme teitä vapauttajina ja te toitte kuolemaa – Viipurin valloituksen yhteydessä teloitetut venäläiset". Venäläissurmat Suomessa 1914–22: Osa 2.2. Sotatapahtumat 1918–22. Prime Minister's Office of Finland. ISBN 952-5354-45-8.
