= Johnson's Russia List =

Email newsletter

Johnson's Russia List (JRL) is an email newsletter containing Russia-related news and analysis in English. David Johnson is the list's editor. Johnson's Russia List generally comes out one time per day. Johnson's Russia List's content includes articles syndicated from other media outlets, as well as comments contributed by its readers. The JRL is a nonprofit project currently sponsored through the Institute for European, Russian, and Eurasian Studies (IERES) at The George Washington University's Elliott School of International Affairs. It was previously a project at the Center for Defense Information and World Security Institute.
