= Finnish Civil War =

1918 civil war in Finland

- Part of World War I
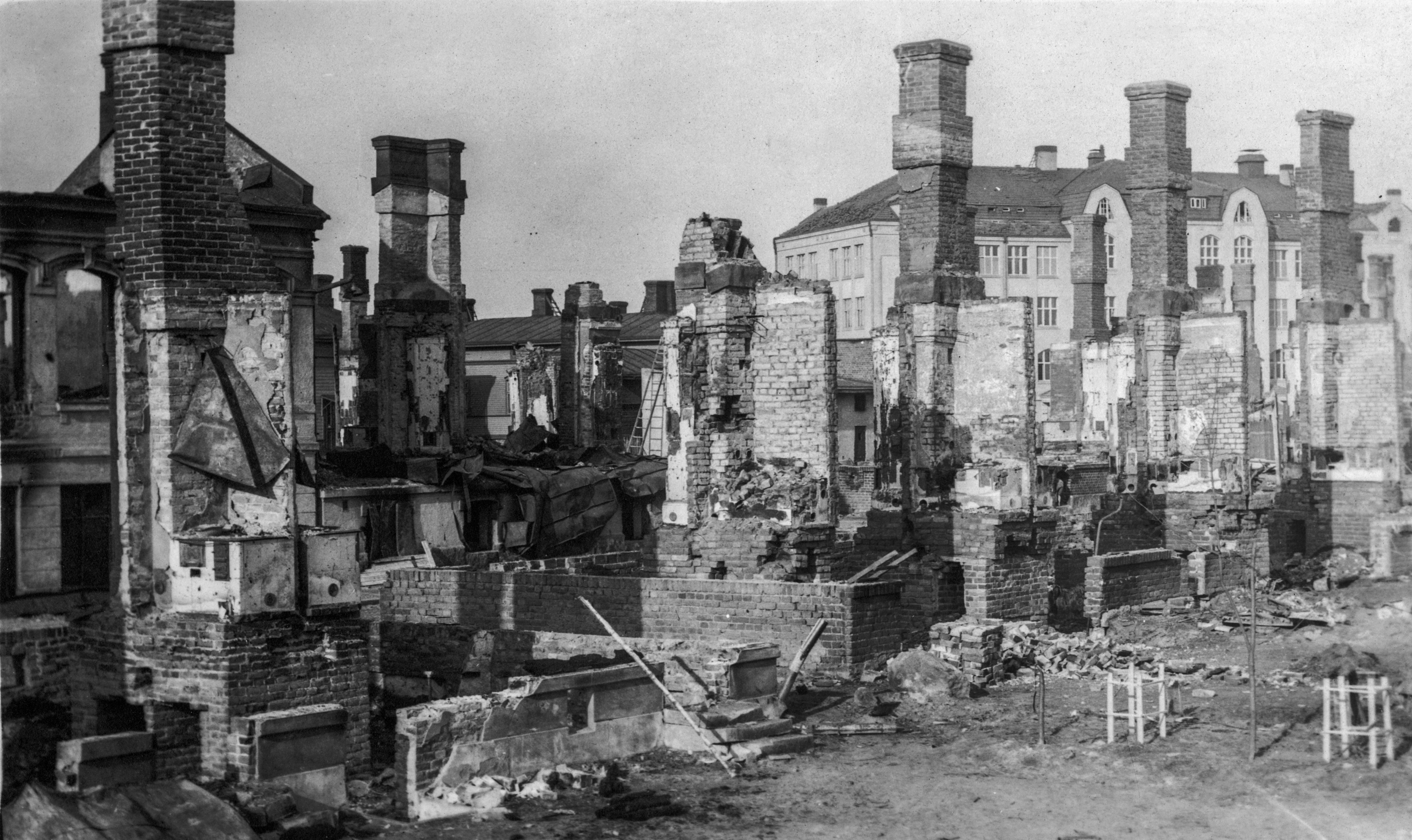
- Tampere's civilian buildings destroyed during the Battle of Tampere
Date	27 January – 15 May 1918; (3 months, 2 weeks and 4 days)
Location	Finland
Result	Finnish Whites victory
Territorial changes	Dissolution of the Finnish Socialist Workers' Republic

Belligerents
Finnish Whites; German Empire; Foreign volunteers: Swedish Brigade; Estonian volunteers; (Second Polish Republic) Polish Legion; (Russian Empire) White Army	Finnish Reds; Soviet Russia; United Kingdom

Commanders and leaders
C. G. E. Mannerheim; Pehr E. Svinhufvud; Hannes Ignatius; Ernst Linder; Ernst Löfström; Martin Wetzer; Karl Wilkman; Hans Kalm; (Second Polish Republic) Stanislaw Boguslawski; (German Empire) Rüdiger von der Goltz; (German Empire) Konrad Wolf; (German Empire) Hans von Tschirsky; (German Empire) Otto von Brandenstein; (German Empire) Hugo Meurer; Harald Hjalmarson; Hjalmar Frisell; (Russian Empire) Nikolai Podgursky	Kullervo Manner; Ali Aaltonen (executed); Eero Haapalainen; Eino Rahja; Adolf Taimi; Evert Eloranta; August Wesley; Hugo Salmela †; Heikki Kaljunen; Fredrik Johansson (executed); Matti Autio (executed); Verner Lehtimäki; (Russian Socialist Federative Soviet Republic) Konstantin Eremeev; (Russian Socialist Federative Soviet Republic) Mikhail Svechnikov; (Russian Socialist Federative Soviet Republic) Georgy Bulatsel (executed)

Units involved
Order of battle	Order of battle

Strength
White Guards 80,000–90,000; Jägers 1,450; Imperial German Army 14,000; Swedish Brigade 1,000; Estonian volunteers; Polish Legion 1,737	Red Guards 80,000–90,000 (2,600 women); Former Russian Imperial Army 4,000–5,000

Casualties and losses
Whites; 3,300 killed; 1,500 executed; 26 missing; 4 prisoner deaths; 30 accidental deaths; Swedish volunteers; 55 killed; Germans; 450–500 killed; Total; 5,500 casualties (100–150 neutral/White civilians)	Reds; 6,200 killed; 9,000 executed; 1,600 missing; 12,500 prisoners deceased, 600 acute deaths after release; 150–200 accidental deaths; Russians; 800–900 killed; 1,500 executed; Total; 32,000–33,000 casualties (100–150 neutral/Red civilians)

The Finnish Civil War (Note: Finnish: Suomen sisällissota; Swedish: Finska inbördeskriget; Russian: Гражданская война в Финляндии, romanized: Grazhdanskaya voyna v Finlyandii; German: Finnischer Bürgerkrieg) (Note: The term "civil war" has come to be commonly used for the conflict in English. For other names, see #Names) was fought in 1918 for the leadership and control of recently independent Finland (formerly part of Russia) between White Finland and the Finnish Socialist Workers' Republic (Red Finland). The clashes took place in the context of the national, political, and social turmoil caused by World War I (Eastern Front) in Europe. The belligerents were the paramilitary Red Guards, led by a section of the Social Democratic Party with backup of the Russian bolsheviks, and the paramilitary White Guards of the senate. General C. G. E. Mannerheim led the White Guards with major assistance by both the Finnish Jäger Battalion trained in Germany and from March-April 1918 by the German Imperial Army, along the German goal to control Fennoscandia and Petrograd of Russia. The Reds, composed of industrial and agrarian working class people, controlled the cities and industrial centres of southern Finland. The Whites, composed of land owners and the middle and upper class, controlled the rural central and northern Finland.

In the years before the civil war, Finland had experienced rapid population growth, industrialisation, gradually increasing urbanisation and the rise of a comprehensive labour movement. The country's political and governmental systems were in an unstable phase of democratisation and modernisation. The socio-economic condition and education of the population had gradually improved, and national awareness and culture had progressed. World War I led to the collapse of the Russian Empire, causing a power vacuum in Finland, and the subsequent struggle for dominance led to militarisation and an escalating crisis between the left-leaning labour movement and the conservatives.

The Reds carried out an unsuccessful general offensive in February 1918, supplied with weapons by Soviet Russia. A counteroffensive by the Whites began in March, reinforced by the German Empire's military detachments in April. The decisive engagements were the Battles of Tampere and Viipuri, won by the Whites, and the Battles of Helsinki and Lahti, won by German troops, leading to overall victory for the Whites and the German forces. Political violence became a part of this warfare with around 12,000 casualties - most of them were Reds. Moreover, about 12,500 Red prisoners died of malnutrition and disease in camps. In total around 38,000 people died in the conflict, where around one million Finns of the total population of three million had been more or less involved with.

In the immediate aftermath, Finland passed from the sphere of influence of Soviet Russia to the German power sphere with a plan to establish a German-led Finnish monarchy. The scheme ended with Germany's defeat in World War I, and Finland instead emerged as a sovereign, democratic, constitutional state with proper civil society. The civil war divided the nation for decades. The Finnish society was gradually reunited through social compromises based on a long-term culture of moderate politics, religion and a post-war economic recovery.

== Names ==
The war has been assigned several designations according to different political and ideological viewpoints. War of Independence (Finnish: vapaussota) was used during the war by both sides to express the fight for liberation from capitalism for the Reds and freedom from Soviet Russian influence by the Whites; Civil War is the term increasingly employed by the reconstituted social democrats after their defeat in the war. The general terms for the conflict, Civil War (Finnish: sisällissota) and Citizen War (Finnish: kansalaissota), are synonymous and appeared mostly after the war. More ideologic names were also used including Class War (Finnish: luokkasota) and Revolution (Finnish: vallankumous) by the Reds and their supporters while Red Rebellion (Finnish: punakapina) was used by the Whites and their supporters. Another designation, Brethren War (Finnish: veljessota), is applied in some poetic settings. According to a 2008 interview of 1,005 people done by the newspaper Aamulehti, the most popular names were as follows: Civil War: 29%, Citizen War: 25%, Class War: 13%, War of Independence: 11%, Red Rebellion: 5%, Revolution: 1%, other name: 2% and no answer: 14%.

== Background ==
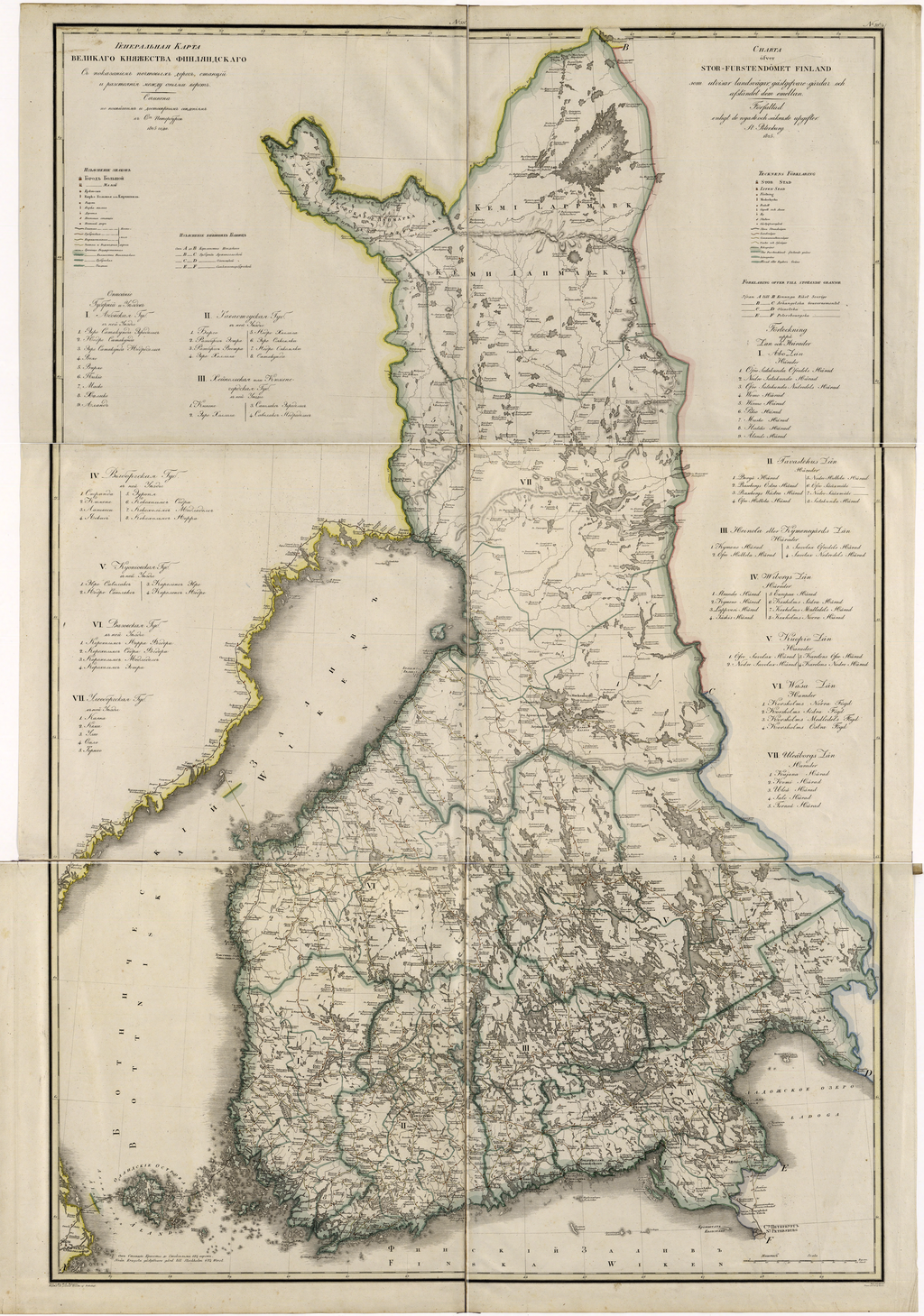
A map of Russia's Grand Duchy of Finland from 1825. The map texts are in Russian and Swedish.

=== Finland as grand duchy: 1809–1917 ===
From 1809 to 1898, a period called the Pax Russica, the peripheral authority of the Finns gradually increased, and relations between the Russian Empire and the Grand Duchy of Finland were largely peaceful. Russia's defeat in the Crimean War in the 1850s led to attempts to speed up the modernisation of the country. This caused more than 50 years of economic, industrial, cultural and educational progress in the Grand Duchy of Finland, including an improvement in the status of the Finnish language. These developments encouraged Finnish nationalism and cultural unity through the birth of the Fennoman movement, which bound the Finns to the domestic administration and led to the idea that the Grand Duchy was an increasingly autonomous state ruled by the Russian Empire.

In contrast, in 1899, the Russian Empire had begun to initiate a policy of integration through the Russification of Finland. The strengthened, pan-slavist central power tried to unite the "Russian Multinational Dynastic Union" as the military and strategic situation of Russia became more perilous due to the rise of Germany and Japan. Finns called the increased military and administrative control, the "First Period of Oppression", and for the first time Finnish politicians drew up plans for disengagement from Russia or full sovereignty for Finland. In the struggle against integration, activists drawn from sections of the working class and the Swedish-speaking intelligentsia carried out terrorist acts. During World War I and the rise of Germanism, the pro-Swedish Svecomans began their covert collaboration with Imperial Germany and, from 1915 to 1917, a Jäger (Finnish: jääkäri; Swedish: jägare) battalion consisting of 1,900 Finnish volunteers was trained in Germany.

=== Domestic politics ===
The major reasons for rising political tensions among Finns were the autocratic rule of the Russian tsar and the undemocratic class system of the estates of the realm. The latter system originated in the regime of the Swedish Empire that preceded Russian governance and divided the Finnish people economically, socially and politically. Finland's population grew rapidly in the nineteenth century (from 860,000 in 1810 to 3,130,000 in 1917), and a class of agrarian and industrial workers, as well as crofters, emerged over the period. The Industrial Revolution was rapid in Finland, though it started later than in the rest of Western Europe. Industrialisation was financed by the state and some of the social problems associated with the industrial process were diminished by the administration's actions. Among urban workers, socio-economic problems steepened during periods of industrial depression. The position of rural workers worsened after the end of the nineteenth century, as farming became more efficient and market-oriented, and the development of industry was insufficiently vigorous to fully utilise the rapid population growth of the countryside.

The difference between Scandinavian-Finnish and Russian-Slavic culture affected the nature of Finnish national integration. The upper social strata took the lead and gained domestic authority from the Russian tsar in 1809. The estates planned to build an increasingly autonomous Finnish state, led by the elite and the intelligentsia. The Fennoman movement aimed to include the common people in a non-political role; the labour movement, youth associations and the temperance movement were initially led "from above".

Between 1870 and 1916 industrialisation gradually improved social conditions and the self-confidence of workers, but while the standard of living of the common people rose in absolute terms, the rift between rich and poor deepened markedly. The commoners' rising awareness of socio-economic and political questions interacted with the ideas of socialism, social liberalism and nationalism. The workers' initiatives and the corresponding responses of the dominant authorities intensified social conflict in Finland.

The Finnish labour movement, which emerged at the end of the nineteenth century from temperance, religious movements and Fennomania, had a Finnish nationalist, working-class character. From 1899 to 1906, the movement became conclusively independent, shedding the paternalistic thinking of the Fennoman estates, and it was represented by the Finnish Social Democratic Party, established in 1899. Workers' activism was directed both toward opposing Russification and in developing a domestic policy that tackled social problems and responded to the demand for democracy. This was a reaction to the domestic dispute, ongoing since the 1880s, between the Finnish nobility-bourgeoisie and the labour movement concerning voting rights for the common people. Despite their obligations as obedient, peaceful subservients and non-political inhabitants of the Grand Duchy (who had, only a few decades earlier, accepted the class system as the natural order of their life), the commoners began to demand their civil rights and citizenship in Finnish society. The power struggle between the Finnish estates and the Russian administration gave a concrete role model and free space for the labour movement. On the other side, due to an at-least century-long tradition and experience of administrative authority, the Finnish elite saw itself as the inherent natural leader of the nation. The political struggle for democracy was solved outside Finland, in international politics: the Russian Empire's failed 1904–1905 war against Japan led to the 1905 Revolution in Russia and to a general strike in Finland. In an attempt to quell the general unrest, the system of estates was abolished in the Parliamentary Reform of 1906. The general strike increased support for the social democrats substantially. The party encompassed a higher proportion of the population than any other socialist movement in the world.

The Reform of 1906 was a major leap towards the political and social liberalisation of the common Finnish people because the Russian House of Romanov had been the most autocratic and conservative ruler in Europe. The Finns adopted a unicameral parliamentary system, the Parliament of Finland (Finnish: eduskunta; Swedish: riksdag) with universal suffrage. The number of voters increased from 126,000 to 1,273,000. The reform included female citizens with both voting rights and eligibility for candidacy in political elections. The reform led to the social democrats obtaining about fifty per cent of the popular vote. Yet, the Reform of 1906 was a halfway milestone on the Finns' trail to the mountain of political liberty. The Russian emperor did not change the year 1772 monarchist constitution, originating from the Swedish Regime and accepted by Russia in 1809. Tsar Nicholas II regained his power after the crisis of 1905-1906, and during the more severe programme of Russification, called the "Second Period of Oppression" by the Finns, he lay a major control over the Finnish Parliament between 1908 and 1917. The emperor did not accept the political decisions and proposals of the Finns, he dissolved the assembly and ordered parliamentary elections almost annually and determined the composition of the Finnish Senate, which did not correlate with the Parliament.

In the domestic politics the capacity of the new Parliament to solve socio-economic problems was stymied by confrontations between the largely uneducated commoners and the former estates. Another conflict festered as employers denied collective bargaining and the right of the labour unions to represent workers. The parliamentary process disappointed the labour movement, but as dominance in the Parliament and legislation was the workers' most likely way to obtain a more balanced society, they identified themselves with the state. Overall the domestic politics led to a contest for leadership of the Finnish state during the ten years before the collapse of the Russian Empire.

=== International politics ===
The main factor behind the Finnish Civil War was a political crisis arising out of World War I. Under the pressures of the Great War, the Russian Empire collapsed, leading to the February and October Revolutions in 1917. This breakdown caused a power vacuum and a subsequent struggle for power in Eastern Europe. The Grand Duchy of Finland became embroiled in the turmoil. Geopolitically less important than the continental Moscow–Warsaw gateway, Finland, isolated by the Baltic Sea, was relatively peaceful until early 1918. The war between the German Empire and Russia had only indirect effects on the Finns. Since the end of the 19th century, the Grand Duchy had become a vital source of raw materials, industrial products, food and labour for the growing Imperial Russian capital Petrograd (modern Saint Petersburg), and World War I emphasised that role. Strategically, the Finnish territory was the less important northern section of the Estonian–Finnish gateway and a buffer zone to and from Petrograd through the Narva area, the Gulf of Finland and the Karelian Isthmus.

The German Empire saw Eastern Europe – particularly Russia – as a major source of vital products and raw materials, both during World War I and for the future. Germany's resources overstretched by the two-front war, the Germans attempted to breakdown Russia by providing financial support to revolutionary groups, such as the Bolsheviks and the Socialist Revolutionary Party, and to radical, separatist factions, such as the Finnish national activist movement leaning toward Germanism. Between 30 and 40 million Reichsmark were spent on this endeavour. Controlling the Finnish area would allow the Imperial German Army to penetrate Petrograd and the Kola Peninsula, an area rich in raw materials for the mining industry. Finland possessed large ore reserves and a well-developed forest industry.

=== February Revolution ===
==== Build-up ====
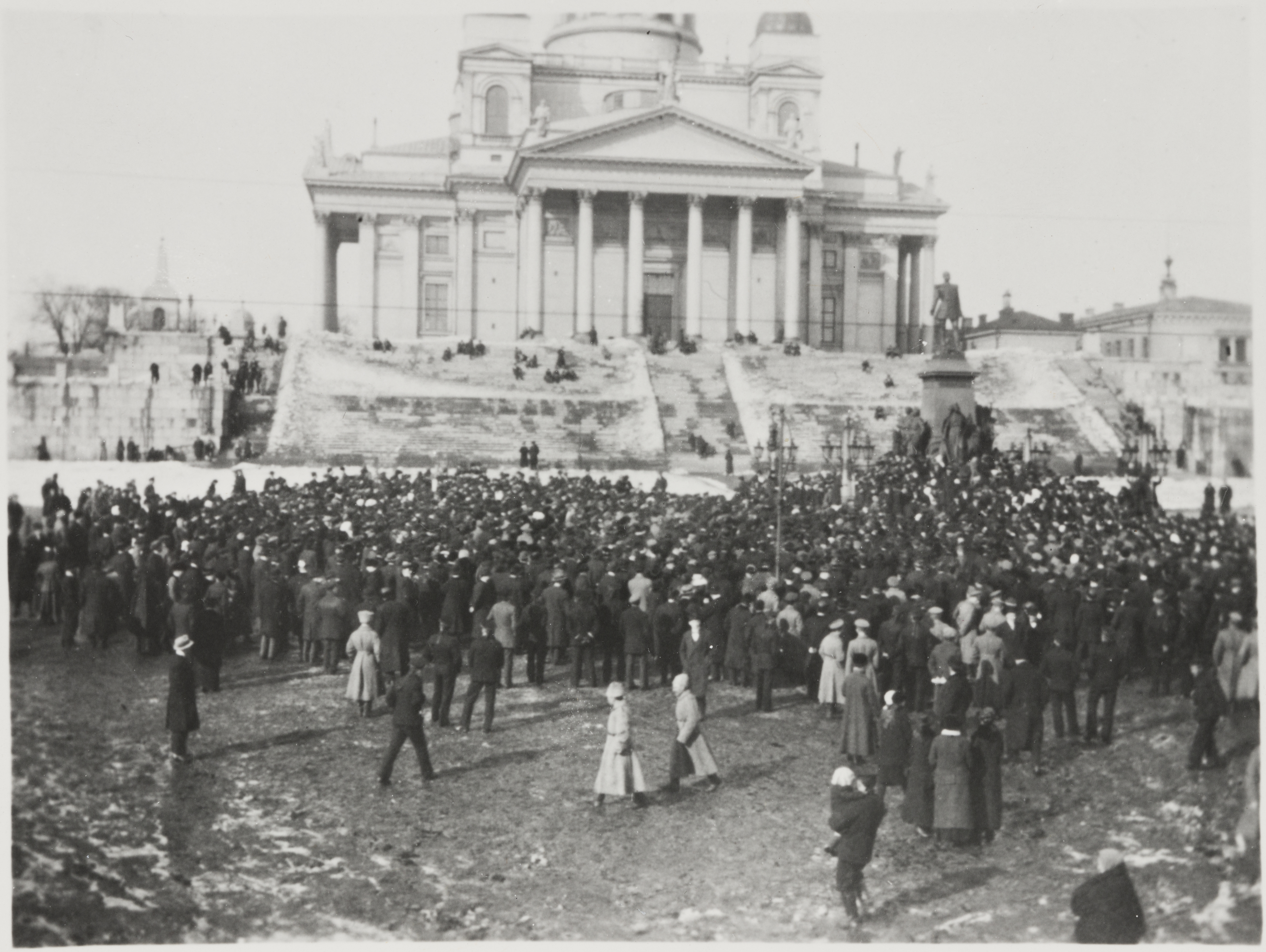
A demonstration at Helsinki Senate Square.

The February Revolution removed Tsar Nicholas II. The collapse of the Russian Empire was caused by military defeats, war-weariness against the duration and hardships of the Great War, and the collision between the most conservative regime in Europe and a Russian people desiring modernisation. The Tsar's power was transferred to the State Duma (Russian Parliament) and the left-leaning Provisional Government, but this new authority was challenged by the Petrograd Soviet (city council), leading to dual power in the country.

In Finland the Second Period of Russification ended and the autonomous status of 1809–1899 was returned to the Finns by the 15th March 1917 manifesto of the Russian Provisional Government. For the first time in history, de facto political power existed in the Parliament of Finland. The political left, consisting mainly of social democrats, covered a wide spectrum from moderate to revolutionary socialists. The political right was even more diverse, ranging from social liberals and moderate conservatives to rightist conservative elements. The four main parties were:

- The conservative Finnish Party;
- the Young Finnish Party, which included both liberals and conservatives, with the liberals divided between social liberals and economic liberals;
- the social reformist, centrist Agrarian League, which drew its support mainly from peasants with small or mid-sized farms; and
- the conservative Swedish People's Party, which sought to retain the rights of the former nobility and the Swedish-speaking minority of Finland.

During 1917, a power struggle and social disintegration interacted. The collapse of Russia induced a chain reaction of disintegration, starting from the government, military and economy, and spreading to all fields of society, such as local administration, workplaces and to individual citizens. The social democrats wanted to retain the civil rights already achieved and to increase the socialists' power over society. The conservatives feared the loss of their long-held socio-economic dominance. Both factions collaborated with their equivalents in Russia, deepening the split in the nation.

The Social Democratic Party gained an absolute majority in the parliamentary elections of 1916. A new Senate was formed in March 1917 by Oskari Tokoi, but it did not reflect the socialists' large parliamentary majority: it comprised six social democrats and six non-socialists. In theory, the Senate consisted of a broad national coalition, but in practice (with the main political groups unwilling to compromise and top politicians remaining outside of it), it proved unable to solve any major Finnish problem. After the February Revolution, political authority descended to the street level: mass meetings, strike organisations and worker-soldier councils on the left and to active organisations of employers on the right, all serving to undermine the authority of the state.

The February Revolution halted the Finnish economic boom caused by the Russian war-economy. The collapse in business led to unemployment and high inflation, but the employed workers gained an opportunity to resolve workplace problems. The commoners' call for the eight-hour working day, better working conditions and higher wages led to mass meetings, demonstrations and large-scale strikes in industry and agriculture.

While the Finns had specialised in milk and butter production, the bulk of the food supply for the country depended on cereals produced in southern Russia. The cessation of cereal imports from disintegrating Russia led to food shortages in Finland. The Senate responded by introducing rationing and price controls. The farmers resisted the state control and thus a black market, accompanied by sharply rising food prices, formed. As a consequence, export to the free market of the Petrograd area increased. Food supply, prices and, in the end, the fear of starvation became emotional political issues between farmers and urban workers, especially those who were unemployed. Common people, their fears exploited by politicians and an incendiary, polarised political media, took to the streets. Despite the food shortages, no actual large-scale starvation hit southern Finland before the civil war and the food market remained a secondary stimulator in the power struggle of the Finnish state.

==== Contest for leadership ====
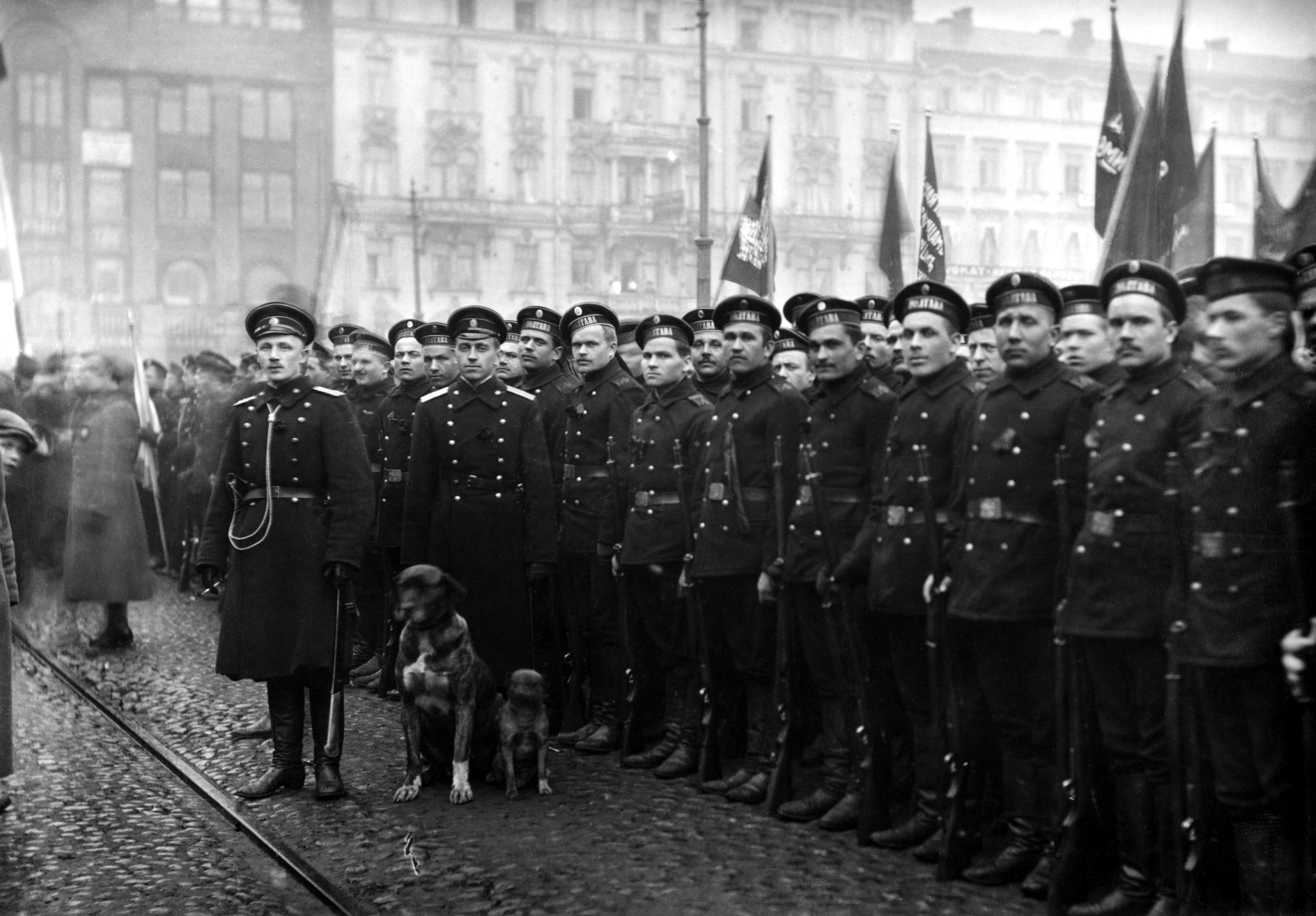
Russian soldiers in Helsinki. Prior to 1917, they sustained Finland's stability, after the February Revolution, the Russian troops became a source of social unrest.

The passing of the Tokoi Senate bill called the "Law of Supreme Power" (Finnish: laki Suomen korkeimman valtiovallan käyttämisestä, more commonly known as valtalaki; Swedish: maktlagen) in July 1917, triggered one of the key crises in the power struggle between the social democrats and the conservatives. The fall of the Russian Empire opened the question of who would hold sovereign political authority in the former Grand Duchy. After decades of political disappointment, the February Revolution offered the Finnish social democrats an opportunity to govern; they held the absolute majority in Parliament. The conservatives were alarmed by the continuous increase of the socialists' influence since 1899, which reached a climax in 1917.

The "Law of Supreme Power" incorporated a plan by the socialists to substantially increase the authority of Parliament, as a reaction to the non-parliamentary and conservative leadership of the Finnish Senate between 1906 and 1916. The bill furthered Finnish autonomy in domestic affairs: the Russian Provisional Government was only allowed the right to control Finnish foreign and military policies. The Act was adopted with the support of the Social Democratic Party, the Agrarian League, part of the Young Finnish Party and the Finnish activists eager for Finnish sovereignty. The conservatives opposed the bill and some of the most right-wing representatives resigned from Parliament.

In Petrograd, the social democrats' plan had the backing of the Bolsheviks. They had been plotting a revolt against the Provisional Government since April 1917, and pro-Soviet demonstrations during the July Days brought matters to a head. The Helsinki Soviet and the Regional Committee of the Finnish Soviets, led by the Bolshevik Ivar Smilga, both pledged to defend the Finnish Parliament, were it threatened with attack. However, the Provisional Government still had sufficient support in the Russian army to survive and as the street movement waned, Vladimir Lenin fled to Karelia. In the aftermath of these events, the "Law of Supreme Power" was overruled and the social democrats eventually backed down; more Russian troops were sent to Finland and, with the co-operation and insistence of the Finnish conservatives, Parliament was dissolved and new elections announced.

In the October 1917 elections, the social democrats lost their absolute majority, which radicalised the labour movement and decreased support for moderate politics. The crisis of July 1917 did not bring about the Red Revolution of January 1918 on its own, but together with political developments based on the commoners' interpretation of the ideas of Fennomania and socialism, the events favoured a Finnish revolution. In order to win power, the socialists had to overcome Parliament.

The February Revolution resulted in a loss of institutional authority in Finland and the dissolution of the police force, creating fear and uncertainty. In response, both the right and left assembled their own security groups, which were initially local and largely unarmed. By late 1917, following the dissolution of Parliament, in the absence of a strong government and national armed forces, the security groups began assuming a broader and more paramilitary character. The Civil Guards (Finnish: suojeluskunnat; Swedish: skyddskåren; lit. 'protection corps') and the later White Guards (Finnish: valkokaartit; Swedish: vita gardet) were organised by local men of influence: conservative academics, industrialists, major landowners, and activists. The Workers' Order Guards (Finnish: työväen järjestyskaartit; Swedish: arbetarnas ordningsgardet) and the Red Guards (Finnish: punakaartit; Swedish: röda gardet) were recruited through the local social democratic party sections and from the labour unions.

=== October Revolution ===
The Bolsheviks' and Vladimir Lenin's October Revolution of 7 November 1917 transferred political power in Petrograd to the radical, left-wing socialists. The German government's decision to arrange safe-conduct for Lenin and his comrades from exile in Switzerland to Petrograd in April 1917, and to financially support the Bolsheviks was a success. An armistice between Germany and the Bolshevik regime came into force on 6 December and peace negotiations began on 22 December 1917 at Brest-Litovsk.

November 1917 became another watershed in the 1917–1918 rivalry for the leadership of Finland. After the dissolution of the Finnish Parliament, polarisation between the social democrats and the conservatives increased markedly and the period witnessed the appearance of political violence. An agricultural worker was shot during a local strike on 9 August 1917 at Ypäjä and a Civil Guard member was killed in a local political crisis at Malmi on 24 September. The October Revolution disrupted the informal truce between the Finnish non-socialists and the Russian Provisional Government. After political wrangling over how to react to the revolt, the majority of the politicians accepted a compromise proposal by Santeri Alkio, the leader of the Agrarian League. Parliament seized the sovereign power in Finland on 15 November 1917 based on the socialists' "Law of Supreme Power" and ratified their proposals of an eight-hour working day and universal suffrage in local elections, from July 1917.

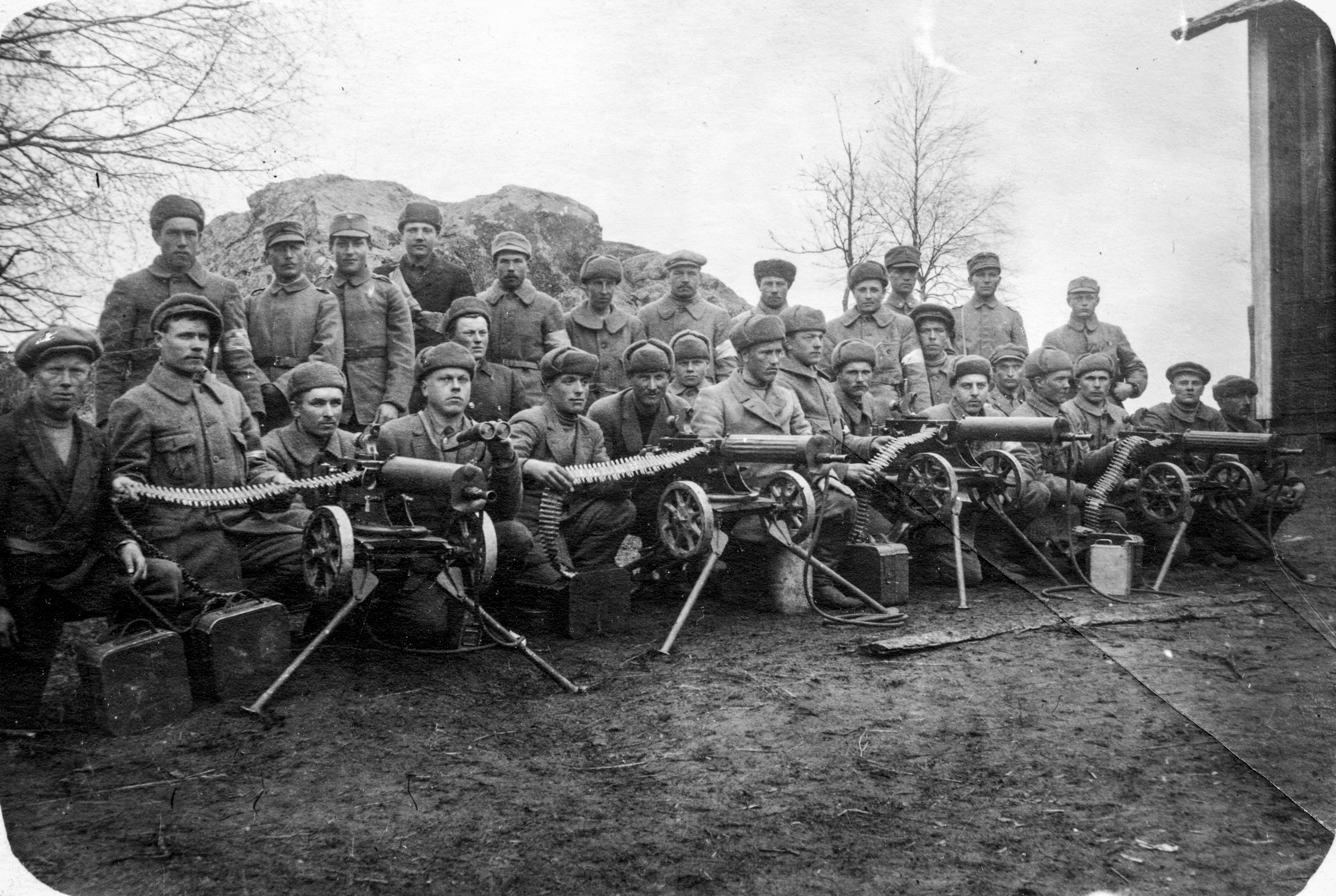
Soldiers of the paramilitary White Guard in Leinola, a suburb of Tampere

The purely non-socialist, conservative-led government of Pehr Evind Svinhufvud was appointed on 27 November. This nomination was both a long-term aim of the conservatives and a response to the challenges of the labour movement during November 1917. Svinhufvud's main aspirations were to separate Finland from Russian rule, to strengthen the Civil Guards, and to return a part of Parliament's new authority to the Senate. There were 149 Civil Guards on 31 August 1917 in Finland, counting local units and subsidiary White Guards in towns and rural communes; 251 on 30 September; 315 on 31 October; 380 on 30 November and 408 on 26 January 1918. The first attempt at serious military training among the Guards was the establishment of a 200-strong cavalry school at the Saksanniemi estate in the vicinity of the town of Porvoo, in September 1917. The vanguard of the Finnish Jägers and German weaponry arrived in Finland during October–November 1917 on the Equity freighter and the German U-boat UC-57; around 50 Jägers had returned by the end of 1917.

After political defeats in July and October 1917, the social democrats put forward an uncompromising program called "We Demand" (Finnish: Me vaadimme; Swedish: Vi kräver) on 1 November, in order to push for political concessions. They insisted upon a return to the political status before the dissolution of Parliament in July 1917, disbandment of the Civil Guards and elections to establish a Finnish Constituent Assembly. The demands of the program were not accepted and the socialists initiated a general strike during 14–19 November to increase political pressure on the conservatives, who had opposed the "Law of Supreme Power" and the parliamentary proclamation of sovereign power on 15 November.

Revolution became the goal of the radicalised socialists after the loss of political control, and events in November 1917 offered momentum for a socialist uprising. In this phase, Lenin and Joseph Stalin, under threat in Petrograd, urged the social democrats to take power in Finland. The majority of Finnish socialists were moderate and preferred parliamentary methods, prompting the Bolsheviks to label them "reluctant revolutionaries". The reluctance diminished as the general strike appeared to offer a major channel of influence for the workers in southern Finland. The strike leadership voted by a narrow majority to start a revolution on 16 November, but the uprising had to be called off the same day due to the lack of active revolutionaries to execute it.

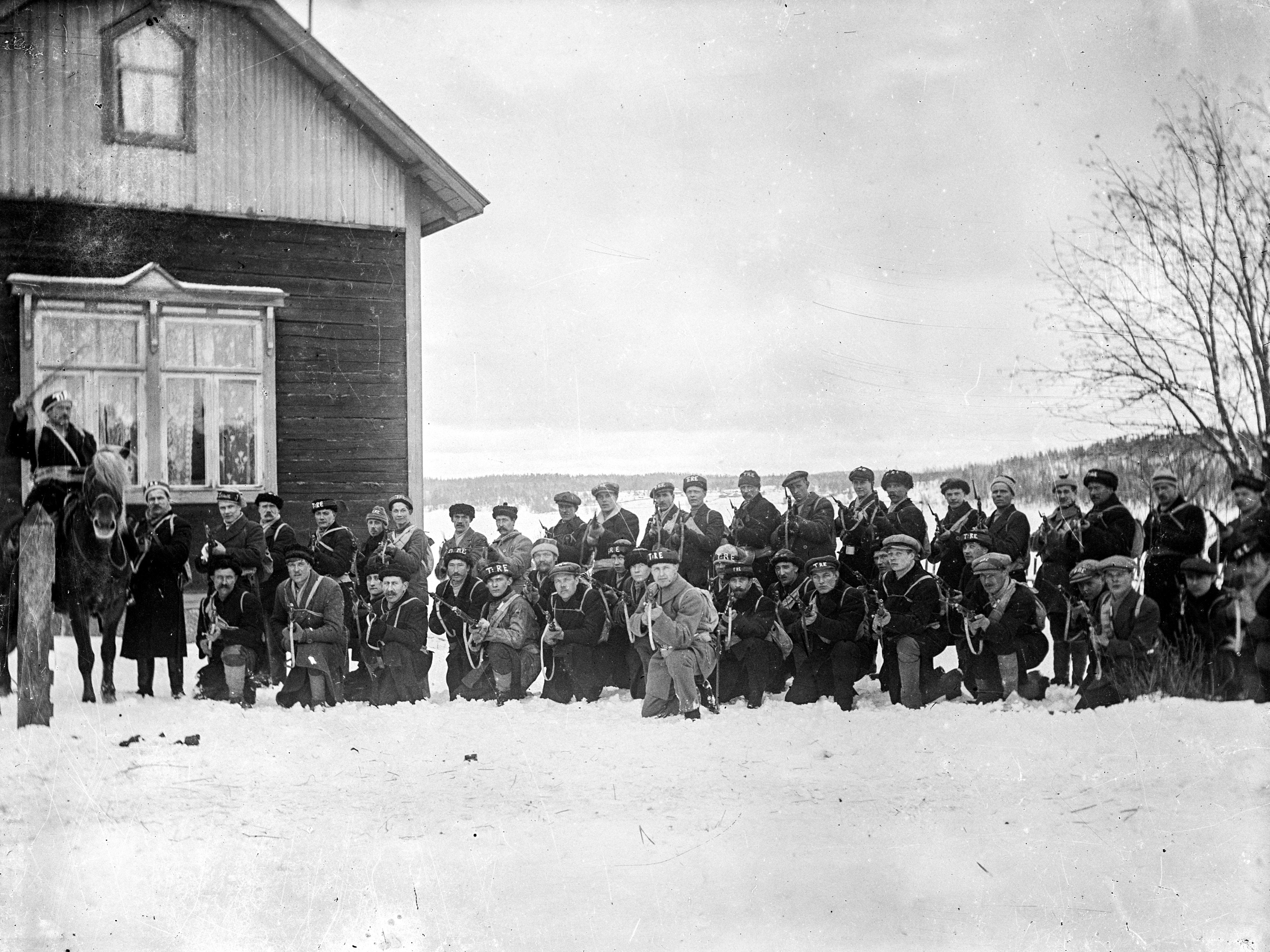
Troops of the paramilitary Red Guard's Tampere company pictured in 1918

At the end of November 1917, the moderate socialists among the social democrats won a second vote over the radicals in a debate over revolutionary versus parliamentary means, but when they tried to pass a resolution to completely abandon the idea of a socialist revolution, the party representatives and several influential leaders voted it down. The Finnish labour movement wanted to sustain a military force of its own and to keep the revolutionary road open, too. The wavering Finnish socialists disappointed V. I. Lenin and in turn, he began to encourage the Finnish Bolsheviks in Petrograd.

Among the labour movement, a more marked consequence of the events of 1917 was the rise of the Workers' Order Guards. There were 20–60 separate guards between 31 August and 30 September 1917, but on 20 October, after defeat in parliamentary elections, the Finnish labour movement proclaimed the need to establish more worker units. The announcement led to a rush of recruits: on 31 October the number of guards was 100–150; 342 on 30 November 1917 and 375 on 26 January 1918. Since May 1917, the paramilitary organisations of the left had grown in two phases, the majority of them as Workers' Order Guards. The minority were Red Guards, these were partly underground groups formed in industrialised towns and industrial centres, such as Helsinki, Kotka and Tampere, based on the original Red Guards that had been formed during 1905–1906 in Finland.

The presence of the two opposing armed forces created a state of dual power and divided sovereignty on Finnish society. The decisive rift between the guards broke out during the general strike: the Reds executed several political opponents in southern Finland and the first armed clashes between the Whites and Reds took place. In total, 34 casualties were reported. Eventually, the political rivalries of 1917 led to an arms race and an escalation towards civil war.

=== Independence of Finland ===
The disintegration of Russia offered Finns a historic opportunity to gain national independence. After the October Revolution, the conservatives were eager for secession from Russia in order to control the left and minimise the influence of the Bolsheviks. The socialists were skeptical about sovereignty under conservative rule, but they feared a loss of support among nationalistic workers, particularly after having promised increased national liberty through the "Law of Supreme Power". Eventually, both political factions supported an independent Finland, despite strong disagreement over the composition of the nation's leadership.

Nationalism had become a "civic religion" in Finland by the end of nineteenth century, but the goal during the general strike of 1905 had been a return to the autonomy of 1809–1898, not full independence. In contrast to their status under the unitary Swedish regime, the domestic power of Finns had increased under the less uniform Russian rule. Economically, the Grand Duchy of Finland benefited from having an independent domestic state budget, a central bank with national currency, the markka (deployed 1860), and customs organisation and the industrial progress of 1860–1916. The economy was dependent on the huge Russian market and separation would disrupt the profitable Finnish financial zone. The economic collapse of Russia and the power struggle of the Finnish state in 1917 were among the key factors that brought sovereignty to the fore in Finland.

Svinhufvud's Senate introduced Finland's Declaration of Independence on 4 December 1917 and Parliament adopted it on 6 December. The social democrats voted against the Senate's proposal, while presenting an alternative declaration of sovereignty. The establishment of an independent state was not a guaranteed conclusion for the small Finnish nation. Recognition by Russia and other great powers was essential; Svinhufvud accepted that he had to negotiate with Lenin for the acknowledgement. The socialists, having been reluctant to enter talks with the Russian leadership in July 1917, sent two delegations to Petrograd to request that Lenin approve Finnish sovereignty.

In December 1917, Lenin was under intense pressure from the Germans to conclude peace negotiations at Brest-Litovsk, and the Bolsheviks' rule was in crisis, with an inexperienced administration and the demoralised army facing powerful political and military opponents. Lenin calculated that the Bolsheviks could fight for central parts of Russia but had to give up some peripheral territories, including Finland in the geopolitically less important north-western corner. As a result, Svinhufvud's delegation won Lenin's concession of sovereignty on 31 December 1917.

By the beginning of the Civil War, Austria-Hungary, Denmark, France, Germany, Greece, Norway, Sweden and Switzerland had recognised Finnish independence. The United Kingdom and United States did not approve it; they waited and monitored the relations between Finland and Germany (the main enemy of the Allies), hoping to override Lenin's regime and to get Russia back into the war against the German Empire. In turn, the Germans hastened Finland's separation from Russian rule so as to move the country to within their sphere of influence.

== Warfare ==
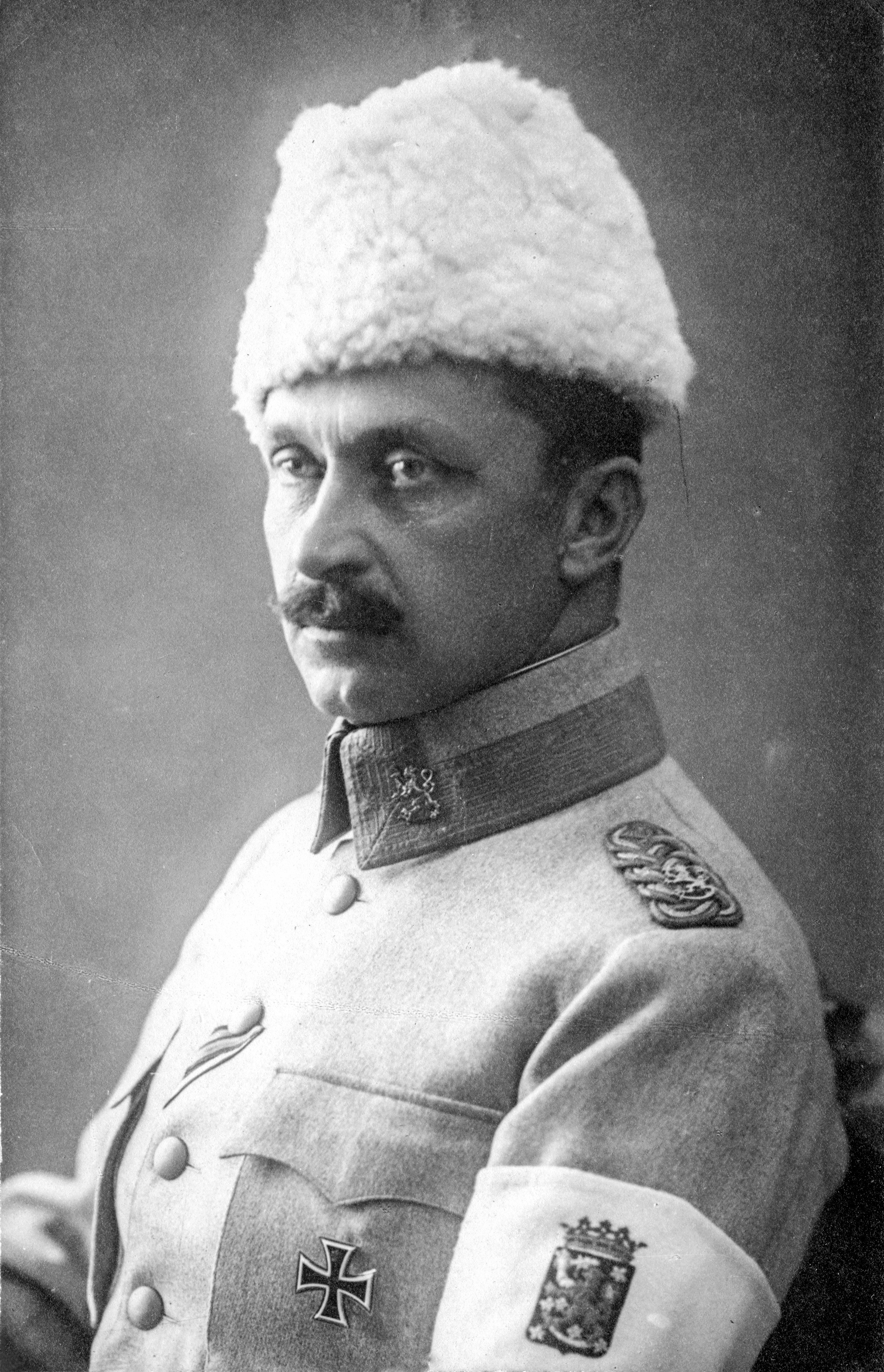
General C. G. E. Mannerheim in 1918, with a white armband showing the coat of arms of Finland

=== Escalation ===
The final escalation towards war began in early January 1918, as each military or political action of the Reds or the Whites resulted in a corresponding counteraction by the other. Both sides justified their activities as defensive measures, particularly to their own supporters. On the left, the vanguard of the movement was the urban Red Guards from Helsinki, Kotka and Turku; they led the rural Reds and convinced the socialist leaders who wavered between peace and war to support the revolution. On the right, the vanguard was the Jägers, who had transferred to Finland, and the volunteer Civil Guards of southwestern Finland, southern Ostrobothnia and Viipuri province in the southeastern corner of Finland. The first local battles were fought during 9–21 January 1918 in southern and southeastern Finland, mainly to win the arms race and to control Viipuri.

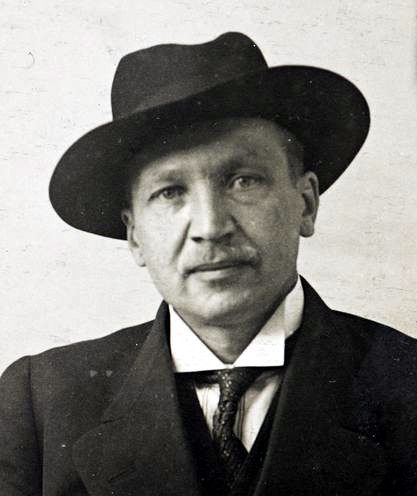
Kullervo Manner, chairman of the Finnish People's Delegation, and last commander-in-chief and also only prime minister of the Finnish Reds, pictured c. 1913–1915

On 12 January 1918, Parliament authorised the Svinhufvud Senate to establish internal order and discipline on behalf of the state. On 15 January, Carl Gustaf Emil Mannerheim, a former Finnish general of the Imperial Russian Army, was appointed the commander-in-chief of the Civil Guards. The Senate appointed the Guards, henceforth called the White Guards, as the White Army of Finland. Mannerheim placed his Headquarters of the White Army in the Vaasa–Seinäjoki area. The White Order to engage was issued on 25 January. The Whites gained weaponry by disarming Russian garrisons during 21–28 January, in particular in southern Ostrobothnia.

The Red Guards, led by Ali Aaltonen, refused to recognise the Whites' hegemony and established a military authority of their own. Aaltonen installed his headquarters in Helsinki and nicknamed it Smolna echoing the Smolny Institute, the Bolsheviks' headquarters in Petrograd. The Red Order for the Finnish 1918 Socialist Revolution was issued on 26 January, and a red lantern, a symbolic indicator of the uprising, was lit in the tower of the Helsinki Workers' House. A large-scale mobilisation of the Reds began late in the evening of 27 January, with the Helsinki Red Guard and some of the Guards located along the Viipuri-Tampere railway having been activated between 23 and 26 January, in order to safeguard vital positions and escort a heavy railroad shipment of Bolshevik weapons from Petrograd to Finland. White troops tried to capture the shipment: 20–30 Finns, Red and White, died in the Battle of Kämärä at the Karelian Isthmus on 27 January 1918. The Finnish rivalry for power had culminated.

=== Opposing parties ===
==== Red Finland and White Finland ====
The frontlines and initial offensives at the beginning of the war. Areas controlled by the Whites and their offensive Areas controlled by the Reds and their offensive Railroad network

At the beginning of the war, a discontinuous front line ran through southern Finland from west to east, dividing the country into White Finland and Red Finland. The Red Guards controlled the area to the south, including nearly all the major towns and industrial centres, along with the largest estates and farms with the highest numbers of crofters and tenant farmers. The White Army controlled the area to the north, which was predominantly agrarian and contained small or medium-sized farms and tenant farmers. The number of crofters was lower and they held a better social status than those in the south. Enclaves of the opposing forces existed on both sides of the front line: within the White area lay the industrial towns of Varkaus, Kuopio, Oulu, Raahe, Kemi and Tornio; within the Red area lay Porvoo, Kirkkonummi and Uusikaupunki. The elimination of these strongholds was a priority for both armies in February 1918.

Red Finland was led by the Finnish People's Delegation (Finnish: kansanvaltuuskunta; Swedish: folkdelegationen), established on 28 January 1918 in Helsinki, which was supervised by the Central Workers' Council. The delegation sought democratic socialism based on the Finnish Social Democratic Party's ethos; their visions differed from Lenin's dictatorship of the proletariat. Otto Ville Kuusinen formulated a proposal for a new constitution, influenced by those of Switzerland and the United States. With it, political power was to be concentrated to Parliament, with a lesser role for a government. The proposal included a multi-party system; freedom of assembly, speech and press; and the use of referendums in political decision-making. In order to ensure the authority of the labour movement, the common people would have a right to permanent revolution. The socialists planned to transfer a substantial part of property rights to the state and local administrations.

In foreign policy, Red Finland leaned on Bolshevist Russia. A Red-initiated Finno–Russian treaty and peace agreement was signed on 1 March 1918, where Red Finland was called the Finnish Socialist Workers' Republic (Finnish: Suomen sosialistinen työväentasavalta; Swedish: Finlands socialistiska arbetarrepublik). The negotiations for the treaty implied that – as in World War I in general – nationalism was more important for both sides than the principles of international socialism. The Red Finns did not simply accept an alliance with the Bolsheviks and major disputes appeared, for example, over the demarcation of the border between Red Finland and Soviet Russia. The significance of the Russo–Finnish Treaty evaporated quickly due to the signing of the Treaty of Brest-Litovsk between the Bolsheviks and the German Empire on 3 March 1918.

Lenin's policy on the right of nations to self-determination aimed at preventing the disintegration of Russia during the period of military weakness. He assumed that in war-torn, splintering Europe, the proletariat of free nations would carry out socialist revolutions and unite with Soviet Russia later. The majority of the Finnish labour movement supported Finland's independence. The Finnish Bolsheviks, influential, though few in number, favoured annexation of Finland by Russia.

The government of White Finland, Pehr Evind Svinhufvud's first senate, was called the Vaasa Senate after its relocation to the safer west-coast city of Vaasa, which acted as the capital of the Whites from 29 January to 3 May 1918. In domestic policy, the White Senate's main goal was to return the political right to power in Finland. The conservatives planned a monarchist political system, with a lesser role for Parliament. A section of the conservatives had always supported monarchy and opposed democracy; others had approved of parliamentarianism since the revolutionary reform of 1906, but after the crisis of 1917–1918, concluded that empowering the common people would not work. Social liberals and reformist non-socialists opposed any restriction of parliamentarianism. They initially resisted German military help, but the prolonged warfare changed their stance.

In foreign policy, the Vaasa Senate relied on the German Empire for military and political aid. Their objective was to defeat the Finnish Reds; end the influence of Bolshevist Russia in Finland and expand Finnish territory to East Karelia, a geopolitically significant home to people speaking Finnic languages. The weakness of Russia inspired an idea of Greater Finland among the expansionist factions of both the right and left: the Reds had claims concerning the same areas. General Mannerheim agreed on the need to take over East Karelia and to request German weapons, but opposed actual German intervention in Finland. Mannerheim recognised the Red Guards' lack of combat skill and trusted in the abilities of the German-trained Finnish Jägers. As a former Russian army officer, Mannerheim was well aware of the demoralisation of the Russian army. He co-operated with White-aligned Russian officers in Finland and Russia.

The main offensives until 6 April 1918. The Whites take Tampere and defeat the Finnish-Russian Reds at the Battle of Rautu, the Karelian Isthmus. Areas controlled by the Whites and their offensive Areas controlled by the Reds and their offensive Railroad network

==== Aviation ====
During the war, the Red Guard utilized aircraft, however, little information regarding their activities and the organisation of detachments was preserved. Its various operations included bombings, reconnaissance, spreading of propaganda literature, and connection flights. Since the Reds had no Finnish pilots, they solely relied on foreign pilots, most of whom were Russian. The Reds had four main operational flight detachments located in Helsinki, Tampere, Kouvola and Viipuri. They divided their detachments into three fronts. The northern front, which was overseen by the detachment in Tampere, consisted of the red troops between the Gulf of Bothnia and Lake Päijänne. The central front was between the Lake Päijänne and Lake Saimaa that was operated by the Kouvola detachment. The base in Viipuri acted as the base for the eastern front, which was located between Lake Saimaa and the national border. Due to poor central command, inadequate fuel quality, low training experience, and poor maintenance, the aerial activity of the Reds was scattered and ineffective.

The insignia of the Finnish Air Force, 1918–1945

The White Guard also had aircraft during the course of the war, which would later evolve into the Finnish Air Force. In February 1918, the Whites would have received an aircraft donation of a reconnaissance and training plane from Sweden, the NAB Type 9 Albatros, however its transport to Vaasa was stopped when the ferry's engine failed at Jakobstad. Therefore, the first plane to officially arrive to the Whites was the license manufactured Morane-Saulnier MS Parasol/Thulin D donated on 6 March 1918 by Swedish Count Eric von Rosen. The aircraft carried Rosen's personal symbol of luck, a right-facing, blue swastika. The symbol was further adopted as the official insignia of the Finnish Air Force till the end of World War II. During the war, the Whites obtained seven additional aircraft which included four Friedrichshafens, two DFWs, and one Rumpler, all of which were bought from Germany. Like the Reds, the Whites also had no domestic pilots and relied on Swedish, Danish, and Russian pilots. The White Guard had two flight detachments during the war; one based at Kolho in northern Pirkanmaa and the other at Antrea in the Viipuri Province. They carried out rather small operations of reconnaissance, leaflet drops, and bombings.

==== Soldiers and weapons ====
The number of Finnish troops on each side varied from 70,000 to 90,000 and both had around 100,000 rifles, 300–400 machine guns and a few hundred cannons. While the Red Guards consisted mostly of volunteers, with wages paid at the beginning of the war, the White Army consisted predominantly of conscripts with 11,000–15,000 volunteers. The main motives for volunteering were socio-economic factors, such as salary and food, as well as idealism and peer pressure. The Red Guards included 2,600 women, mostly recruited from the industrial centres and cities of southern Finland. Urban and agricultural workers constituted the majority of the Red Guards, whereas land-owning farmers and well-educated people formed the backbone of the White Army. Both armies used child soldiers, mainly between 14 and 17 years of age. The use of juvenile soldiers was not rare in World War I; children of the time were under the absolute authority of adults and were not shielded against exploitation.

Rifles and machine guns from Imperial Russia were the main armaments of the Reds and the Whites. The most commonly used rifle was the Russian 7.62mm (.30 cal) Mosin–Nagant Model 1891. In total, around ten different rifle models were in service, causing problems for ammunition supply. The Maxim gun was the most-used machine gun, along with the less-used M1895 Colt–Browning, Lewis and Madsen guns. The machine guns caused a substantial part of the casualties in combat. Russian field guns were mostly used with direct fire.

The Civil War was fought primarily along railways; vital means for transporting troops and supplies, as well for using armoured trains, equipped with light cannons and heavy machine guns. The strategically most important railway junction was Haapamäki, approximately 100 kilometres (62 mi) northeast of Tampere, connecting eastern and western Finland and as well as southern and northern Finland. Other critical junctions included Kouvola, Riihimäki, Tampere, Toijala and Viipuri. The Whites captured Haapamäki at the end of January 1918, leading to the Battle of Vilppula.

The German Army's landings on the south coast and their operations. The Whites' decisive offensives in Karelia. Areas controlled by the Whites and their offensive German offensive Areas controlled by the Reds Railroad network

==== Red Guards and Soviet troops ====
The Finnish Red Guards seized the early initiative in the war by taking control of Helsinki on 28 January 1918 and by undertaking a general offensive lasting from February till early March 1918. The Reds were relatively well-armed, but a chronic shortage of skilled leaders, both at the command level and in the field, left them unable to capitalise on this momentum, and most of the offensives came to nothing. The military chain of command functioned relatively well at company and platoon level, but leadership and authority remained weak as most of the field commanders were chosen by the vote of the troops. The common troops were more or less armed civilians, whose military training, discipline and combat morale were both inadequate and low.

Ali Aaltonen was replaced on 28 January 1918 by Eero Haapalainen as commander-in-chief. He, in turn, was displaced by the Bolshevik triumvirate of Eino Rahja, Adolf Taimi and Evert Eloranta on 20 March. The last commander-in-chief of the Red Guard was Kullervo Manner, from 10 April until the last period of the war when the Reds no longer had a named leader. Some talented local commanders, such as Hugo Salmela in the Battle of Tampere, provided successful leadership, but could not change the course of the war. The Reds achieved some local victories as they retreated from southern Finland toward Russia, such as against German troops in the Battle of Syrjäntaka on 28–29 April in Tuulos.

Around 50,000 of the former tsar's army troops were stationed in Finland in January 1918. The soldiers were demoralised and war-weary, and the former serfs were thirsty for farmland set free by the revolutions. The majority of the troops returned to Russia by the end of March 1918. In total, 4,000 to 5,000 Red Russian soldiers supported the Finnish Reds, but only around 3,000, in separate, smaller units of 100–1,000 soldiers, could be persuaded to fight in the front line.

The revolutions in Russia divided the Soviet army officers politically and their attitude towards the Finnish Civil War varied. Mikhail Svechnikov led Finnish Red troops in western Finland in February and Konstantin Yeremejev Soviet forces on the Karelian Isthmus, while other officers were mistrustful of their revolutionary peers and instead co-operated with General Mannerheim, in disarming Soviet garrisons in Finland. On 30 January 1918, Mannerheim proclaimed to Russian soldiers in Finland that the White Army did not fight against Russia, but that the objective of the White campaign was to beat the Finnish Reds and the Soviet troops supporting them.

The number of Soviet soldiers active in the civil war declined markedly once Germany attacked Russia on 18 February 1918. The German-Soviet Treaty of Brest-Litovsk of 3 March restricted the Bolsheviks' support for the Finnish Reds to weapons and supplies. The Soviets remained active on the south-eastern front, mainly in the Battle of Rautu on the Karelian Isthmus between February and April 1918, where they defended the approaches to Petrograd.

==== White Guards and Sweden's role ====
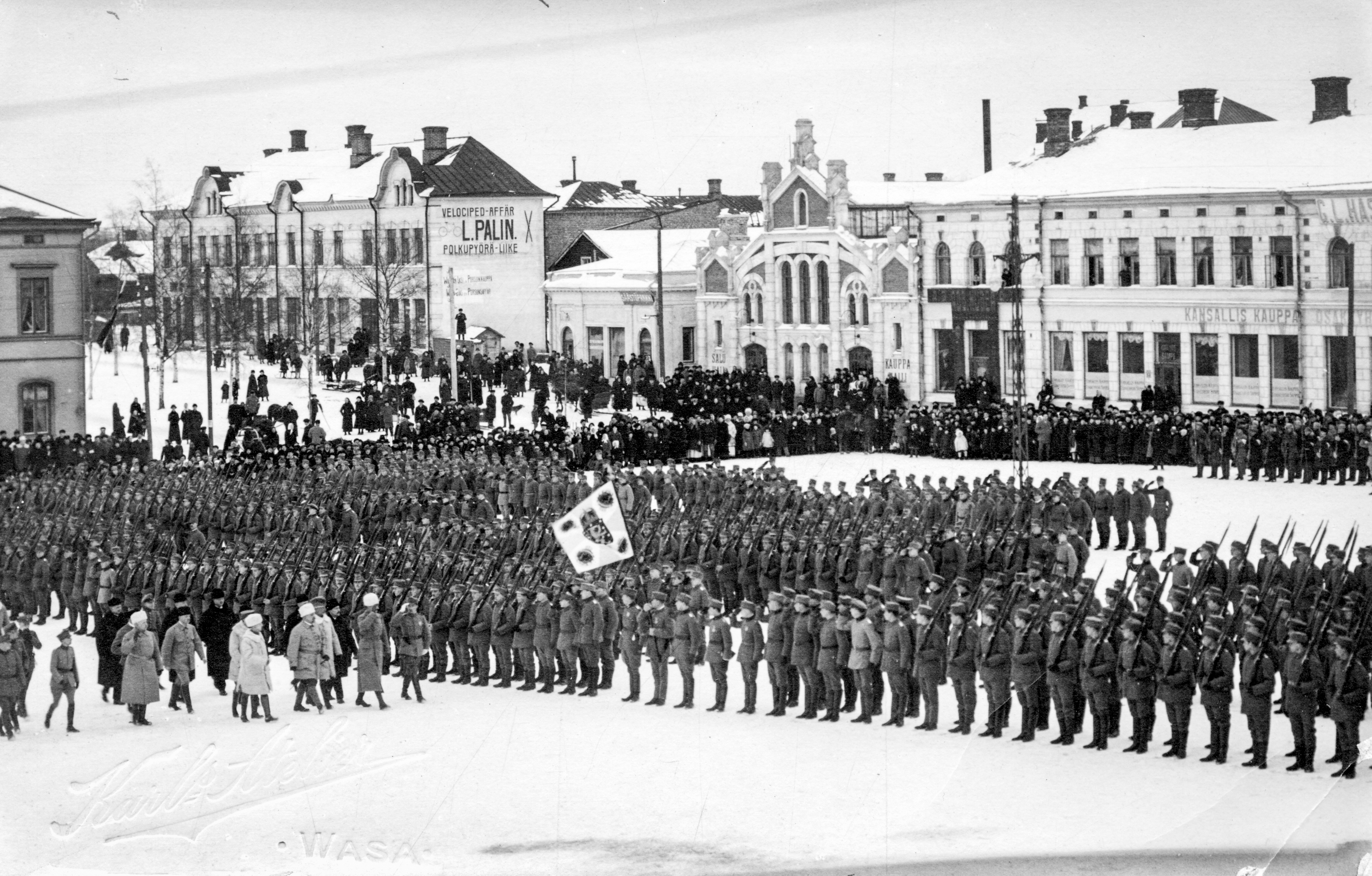
Finnish Jägers in Vaasa, Finland, on 26 February 1918. The battalion is being inspected by White Commander-in-Chief C. G. E. Mannerheim.

While the conflict has been called by some "The War of Amateurs", the White Army had two major advantages over the Red Guards: the professional military leadership of Gustaf Mannerheim and his staff, which included 84 Swedish volunteer officers and former Finnish officers of the tsar's army; and 1,450 soldiers of the 1,900-strong, Jäger battalion. The majority of the unit arrived in Vaasa on 25 February 1918. On the battlefield, the Jägers, battle-hardened on the Eastern Front, provided strong leadership that made disciplined combat of the common White troopers possible. The soldiers were similar to those of the Reds, having brief and inadequate training. At the beginning of the war, the White Guards' top leadership had little authority over volunteer White units, which obeyed only their local leaders. At the end of February, the Jägers started a rapid training of six conscript regiments.

The Jäger battalion was politically divided, too. Four-hundred-and-fifty – mostly socialist – Jägers remained stationed in Germany, as it was feared they were likely to side with the Reds. White Guard leaders faced a similar problem when drafting young men to the army in February 1918: 30,000 obvious supporters of the Finnish labour movement never showed up. It was also uncertain whether common troops drafted from the small-sized and poor farms of central and northern Finland had strong enough motivation to fight the Finnish Reds. The Whites' propaganda promoted the idea that they were fighting a defensive war against Bolshevist Russians, and belittled the role of the Red Finns among their enemies. Social divisions appeared both between southern and northern Finland and within rural Finland. The economy and society of the north had modernised more slowly than that of the south. There was a more pronounced conflict between Christianity and socialism in the north, and the ownership of farmland conferred major social status, motivating the farmers to fight against the Reds.

Sweden declared neutrality both during World War I and the Finnish Civil War. General opinion, in particular among the Swedish elite, was divided between supporters of the Allies and the Central powers, Germanism being somewhat more popular. Three war-time priorities determined the pragmatic policy of the Swedish liberal-social democratic government: sound economics, with export of iron-ore and foodstuff to Germany; sustaining the tranquility of Swedish society; and geopolitics. The government accepted the participation of Swedish volunteer officers and soldiers in the Finnish White Army in order to block expansion of revolutionary unrest to Scandinavia.

A 1,000-strong paramilitary Swedish Brigade, led by Hjalmar Frisell, took part in the Battle of Tampere and in the fighting south of the town. In February 1918, the Swedish Navy escorted the German naval squadron transporting Finnish Jägers and German weapons and allowed it to pass through Swedish territorial waters. The Swedish socialists tried to open peace negotiations between the Whites and the Reds. The weakness of Finland offered Sweden a chance to take over the geopolitically vital Finnish Åland Islands, east of Stockholm, but the German army's Finland operation stalled this plan.

==== German intervention ====
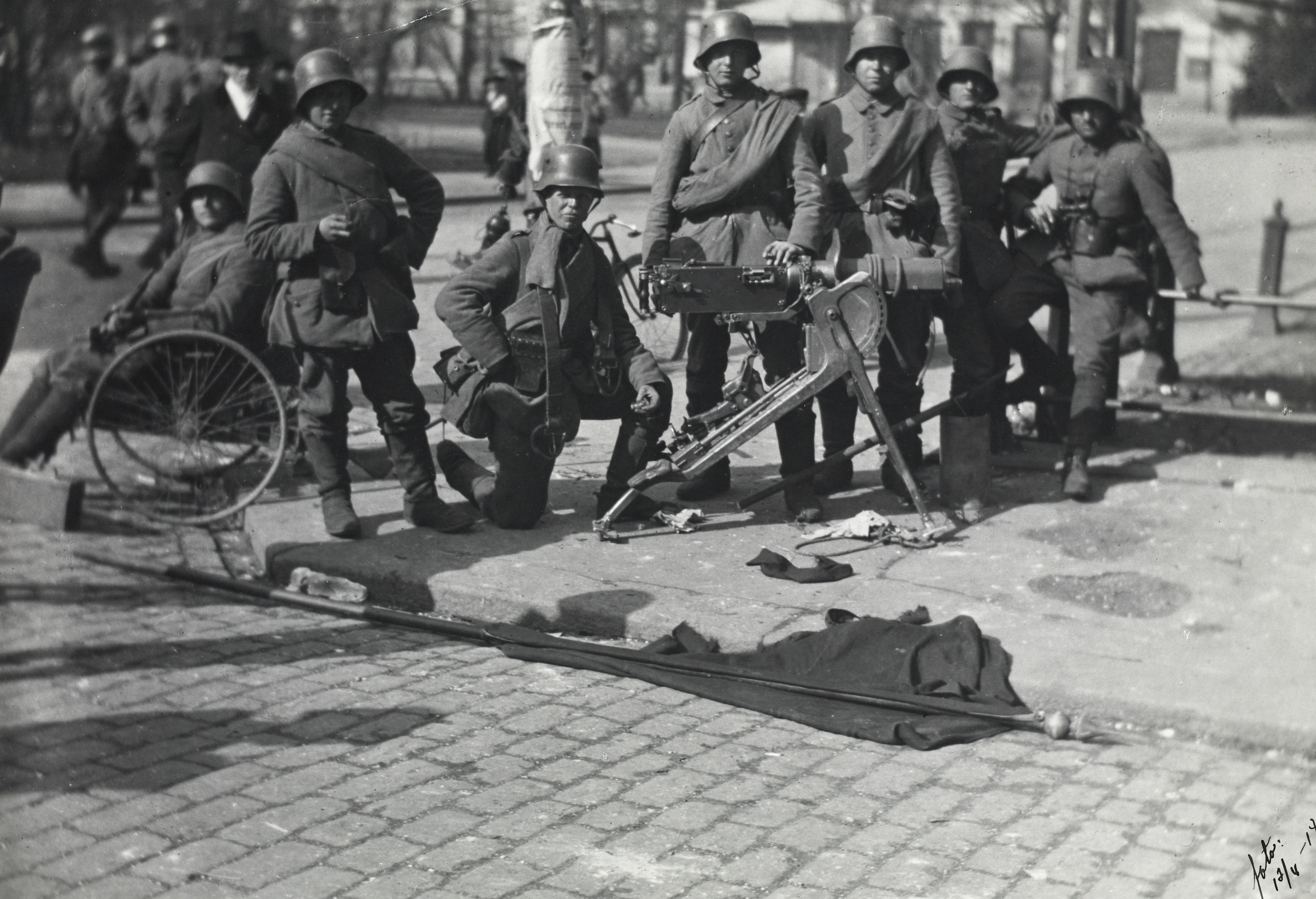
German soldiers with an MG 08 machine gun in Helsinki after the surrender of the Red Guard headquarters in the Smolna. Photograph by Gunnar Lönnqvist

In March 1918, the German Empire intervened in the Finnish Civil War on the side of the White Army. After the February Revolution the Finnish activists intensified their requests for Germany's aid in freeing Finland from Russia, but the Germans' main focus was not in Finland. Instead, in particular after the October Revolt under the military pressure they were facing at the Western Front, the Germans did not want to jeopardise their armistice and peace negotiations with Soviet Russia. The German stance changed after 10 February 1918 when Leon Trotsky, despite the weakness of the Bolsheviks' position, broke off negotiations, hoping revolutions would break out in the German Empire and change everything. On 13 February, the German leadership decided to retaliate and send military detachments to Finland too. As a pretext for aggression, the Germans invited "requests for help" from the western neighbouring countries of Russia. Representatives of White Finland in Berlin duly requested help on 14 February.

The Imperial German Army attacked Russia on 18 February. The offensive led to a rapid collapse of the Soviet forces and to the signing of the first Treaty of Brest-Litovsk by the Bolsheviks on 3 March 1918. Finland, the Baltic countries, Poland and Ukraine were transferred to the German sphere of influence. The Finnish Civil War opened a low-cost access route to Fennoscandia, where the geopolitical status was altered as a Royal Navy squadron occupied the Soviet harbour of Murmansk by the Arctic Ocean on 9 March 1918. The action led to e.g. Petsamo clashes in May 1918 between the British troops and the Finnish Whites. The leader of the German war effort, General Erich Ludendorff, wanted to keep Petrograd under threat of attack via the Viipuri-Narva area and to install a German-led monarchy in Finland.

On 5 March 1918, a German naval squadron landed on the Åland Islands (in mid-February 1918, the islands had been occupied by a Swedish military expedition, which departed from there in May). On 3 April 1918, the 10,000-strong Baltic Sea Division (German: Ostsee-Division), led by General Rüdiger von der Goltz, launched the main attack at Hanko, west of Helsinki. It was followed on 7 April by Colonel Otto von Brandenstein's 3,000-strong Detachment Brandenstein (German: Abteilung Brandenstein) taking the town of Loviisa east of Helsinki. The larger German formations advanced eastwards from Hanko and took Helsinki on 12–13 April, while Detachment Brandenstein overran the town of Lahti on 19 April. The main German detachment proceeded northwards from Helsinki and took Hyvinkää and Riihimäki on 21–22 April, followed by Hämeenlinna on 26 April. The final blow to the cause of the Finnish Reds was dealt when the Bolsheviks broke off the peace negotiations at Brest-Litovsk, leading to the German eastern offensive in February 1918.

=== Decisive engagements ===
==== Battle of Tampere ====
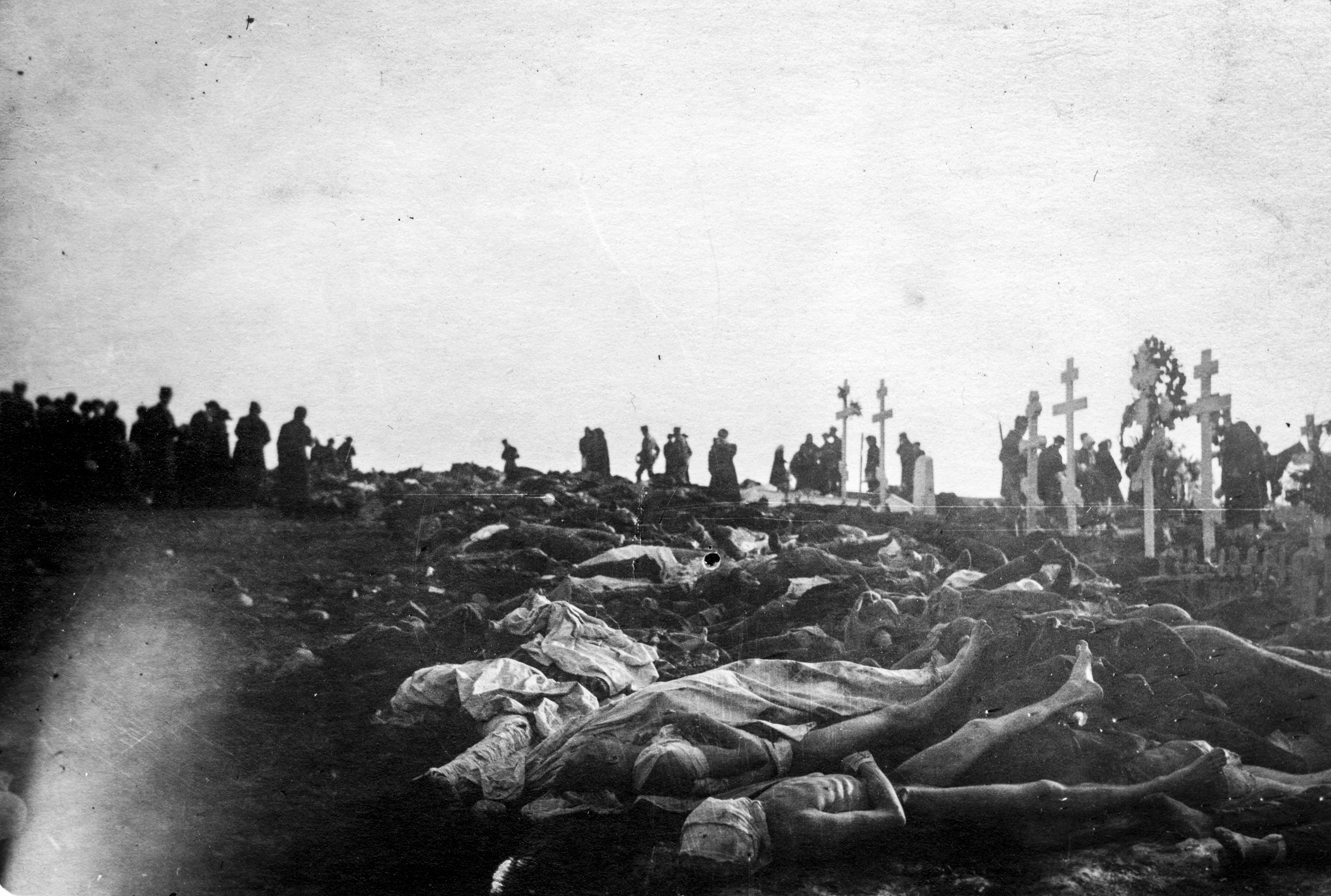
Unburied bodies of the Reds at Kalevankangas cemetery after the Battle of Tampere

In February 1918, General Mannerheim considered where to focus the general offensive of the Whites. There were two strategically vital enemy strongholds: Tampere, Finland's major industrial town in the south-west, and Viipuri, Karelia's main city. Although seizing Viipuri offered many advantages, his army's lack of combat skills and the potential for a major counterattack by the Reds in the area or in the south-west made it too risky.

Mannerheim decided to strike first at Tampere, despite the fact that the town, mostly known for its working class, housed nearly 15,000 heavily armed Red Guards. He launched the main assault on 16 March 1918, at Längelmäki 65 km (40 mi) north-east of the town, through the right flank of the Reds' defence. At the same time, the Whites attacked through the north-western frontline Vilppula–Kuru–Kyröskoski–Suodenniemi. Although the Whites were unaccustomed to offensive warfare, some Red Guard units collapsed and retreated in panic under the weight of the offensive, while other Red detachments defended their posts to the last and were able to slow the advance of the White troops. Eventually, the Whites lay siege to Tampere. They cut off the Reds' southward connection at Lempäälä on 24 March and westward ones at Siuro, Nokia, and Ylöjärvi on 25 March.

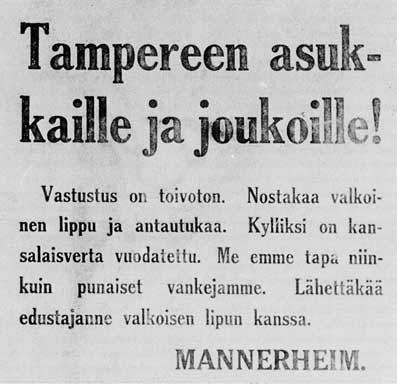
A propaganda leaflet signed by General Mannerheim circulated by the Whites urging the Red defenders to surrender. [English: To the residents and troops of Tampere! Resistance is hopeless. Raise the white flag and surrender. The blood of the citizen has been shed enough. We will not kill like the Reds kill their prisoners. Send your representative with a white flag.]

The Battle for Tampere was fought between 16,000 White and 14,000 Red soldiers. It was Finland's first large-scale urban battle and one of the four most decisive military engagements of the war. The fight for the area of Tampere began on 28 March, on the eve of Easter 1918, later called "Bloody Maundy Thursday", in the Kalevankangas Cemetery. The White Army did not achieve a decisive victory in the fierce combat, suffering more than 50 per cent losses in some of their units. The Whites had to re-organise their troops and battle plans, managing to raid the town centre in the early hours of 3 April.

After a heavy, concentrated artillery barrage, the White Guards advanced from house to house and street to street, as the Red Guards retreated. In the late evening of 3 April, the Whites reached the eastern banks of the Tammerkoski rapids. The Reds' attempts to break the siege of Tampere from the outside along the Helsinki-Tampere railway failed. The Red Guards lost the western parts of the town between 4 and 5 April. The Tampere City Hall was among the last strongholds of the Reds. The battle ended 6 April 1918 with the surrender of Red forces in the Pyynikki and Pispala sections of Tampere.

The Reds, now on the defensive, showed increased motivation to fight during the battle. General Mannerheim was compelled to deploy some of the best-trained Jäger detachments, initially meant to be conserved for later use in the Viipuri area. The Battle of Tampere was the bloodiest action of the Civil War. The White Army lost 700–900 men, including 50 Jägers, the highest number of deaths the Jäger battalion suffered in a single battle of the 1918 war. The Red Guards lost 1,000–1,500 soldiers, with a further 11,000–12,000 captured. Seventy-one civilians died, mainly due to artillery fire. The eastern parts of the city, consisting mostly of wooden buildings, were completely destroyed.

==== Battle of Helsinki ====
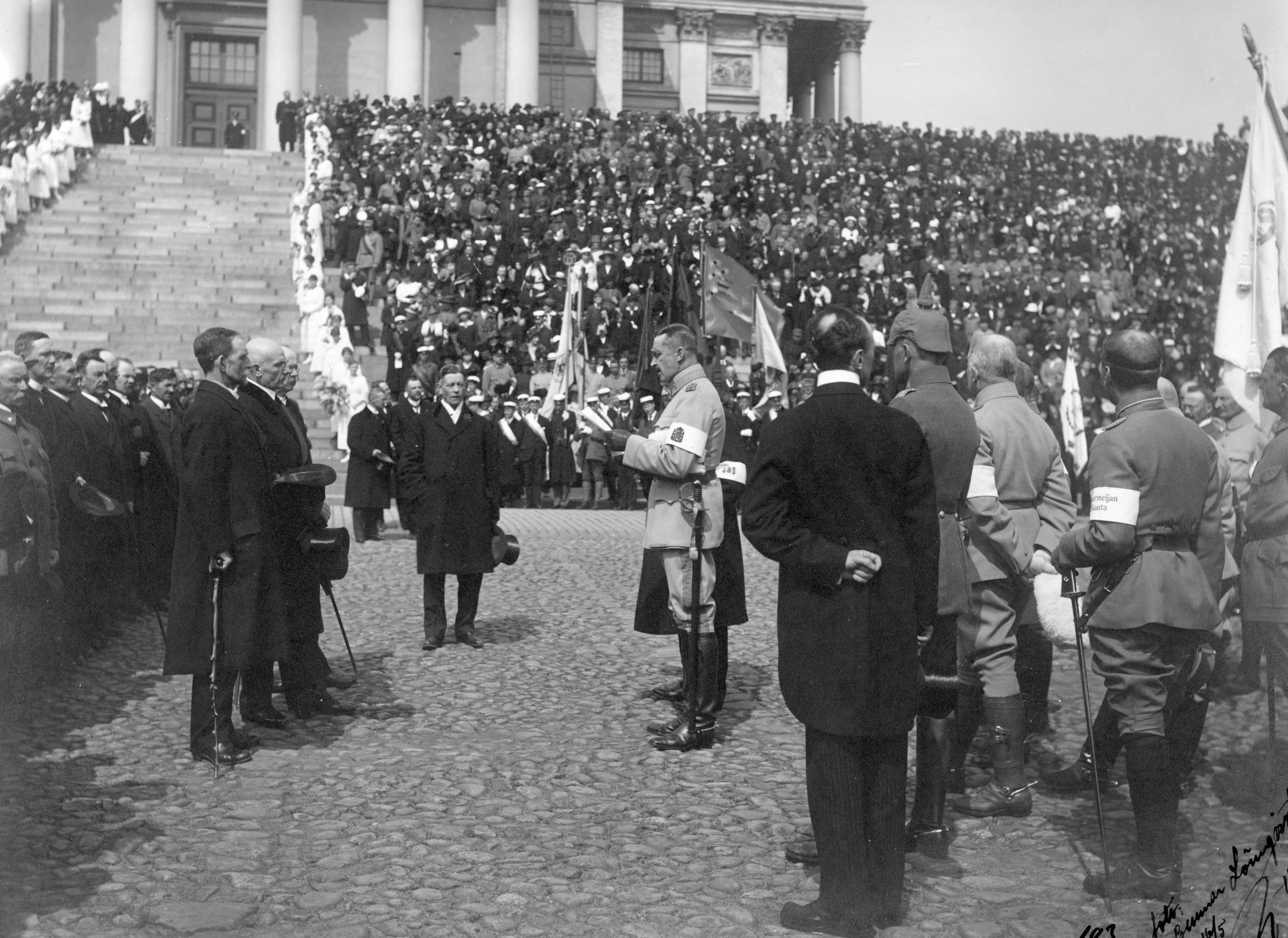
The White Army parade on Senate Square after the conquest of Helsinki on May 16, 1918

After peace talks between Germans and the Finnish Reds were broken off on 11 April 1918, the battle for the capital of Finland began. At 05:00 on 12 April, around 2,000–3,000 German Baltic Sea Division soldiers, led by Colonel Hans von Tschirsky und von Bögendorff, attacked the city from the north-west, supported via the Helsinki-Turku railway. The Germans broke through the area between Munkkiniemi and Pasila, and advanced on the central-western parts of the town. The German naval squadron led by Vice Admiral Hugo Meurer blocked the city harbour, bombarded the southern town area, and landed Seebataillon marines at Katajanokka.

Around 7,000 Finnish Reds defended Helsinki, but their best troops fought on other fronts of the war. The main strongholds of the Red defence were the Workers' Hall, the Helsinki railway station, the Red Headquarters at Smolna, the Senate Palace–Helsinki University area and the former Russian garrisons. By the late evening of 12 April, most of the southern parts and all of the western area of the city had been occupied by the Germans. Local Helsinki White Guards, having hidden in the city during the war, joined the battle as the Germans advanced through the town.

On 13 April, German troops took over the Market Square, the Smolna, the Presidential Palace and the Senate-Ritarihuone area. Toward the end, a German brigade with 2,000–3,000 soldiers, led by Colonel Konrad Wolf joined the battle. The unit rushed from north to the eastern parts of Helsinki, pushing into the working-class neighbourhoods of Hermanni, Kallio and Sörnäinen. German artillery bombarded and destroyed the Workers' Hall and put out the red lantern of the Finnish revolution. The eastern parts of the town surrendered around 14:00 on 13 April, when a white flag was raised in the tower of the Kallio Church. Sporadic fighting lasted until the evening. In total, 60 Germans, 300–400 Reds and 23 White Guard troopers were killed in the battle. Around 7,000 Reds were captured. The German army celebrated the victory with a military parade in the centre of Helsinki on 14 April 1918.

==== Battle of Hyvinkää ====
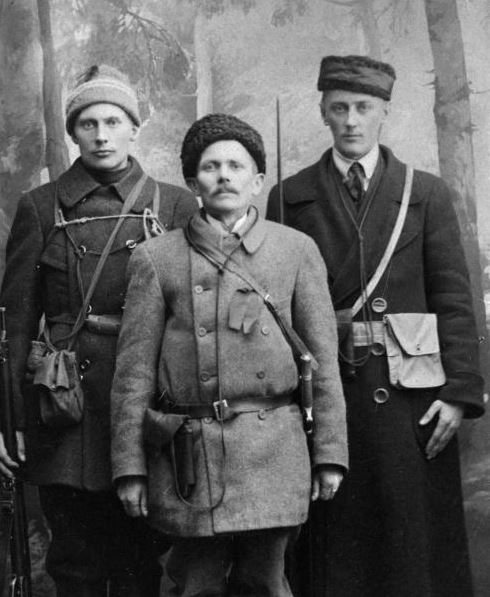
Oskari Koivula (front), commander of the Red Guards of Hyvinkää, and Emil Ylén (left)

After losing Helsinki, the Red Defense Command moved to Riihimäki, where it was headed by painter and former Member of Parliament Efraim Kronqvist. German troops, led by Wolf, attacked north from Helsinki on April 15 and conquered Klaukkala four days later. Over April 19–21, the Germans captured the town of Hyvinkää; 21 Germans and about 50 Red Guards were killed there. After the battle, at least 150 of the Reds were executed by the Whites. The Germans continued from there through Riihimäki to Hämeenlinna.

==== Battle of Lahti ====
On 19 April 1918, Detachment Brandenstein took over the town of Lahti. The German troops advanced from the east-southeast via Nastola, through the Mustankallio graveyard in Salpausselkä and the Russian garrisons at Hennala. The battle was minor but strategically important as it cut the connection between the western and eastern Red Guards. Local engagements broke out in the town and the surrounding area between 22 April and 1 May 1918 as several thousand western Red Guards and Red civilian refugees tried to push through on their way to Russia. The German troops were able to hold major parts of the town and halt the Red advance. In total, 600 Reds and 80 German soldiers perished, and 30,000 Reds were captured in and around Lahti.

==== Battle of Viipuri ====
After the defeat in Tampere, the Red Guards began a slow retreat eastwards. As the German army seized Helsinki, the White Army shifted the military focus to Viipuri area, where 18,500 Whites advanced against 15,000 defending Reds. General Mannerheim's war plan had been revised as a result of the Battle for Tampere, a civilian, industrial town. He aimed to avoid new, complex city combat in Viipuri, an old military fortress. The Jäger detachments tried to tie down and destroy the Red force outside the town. The Whites were able to cut the Reds' connection to Petrograd and weaken the troops on the Karelian Isthmus on 20–26 April, but the decisive blow remained to be dealt in Viipuri. The final attack began on late 27 April with a heavy Jäger artillery barrage. The Reds' defence collapsed gradually, and eventually the Whites conquered Patterinmäki—the Reds' symbolic last stand of the 1918 uprising—in the early hours of 29 April 1918. In total, 400 Whites died, and 500–600 Reds perished and 12,000–15,000 were captured.

=== Red and White terror ===
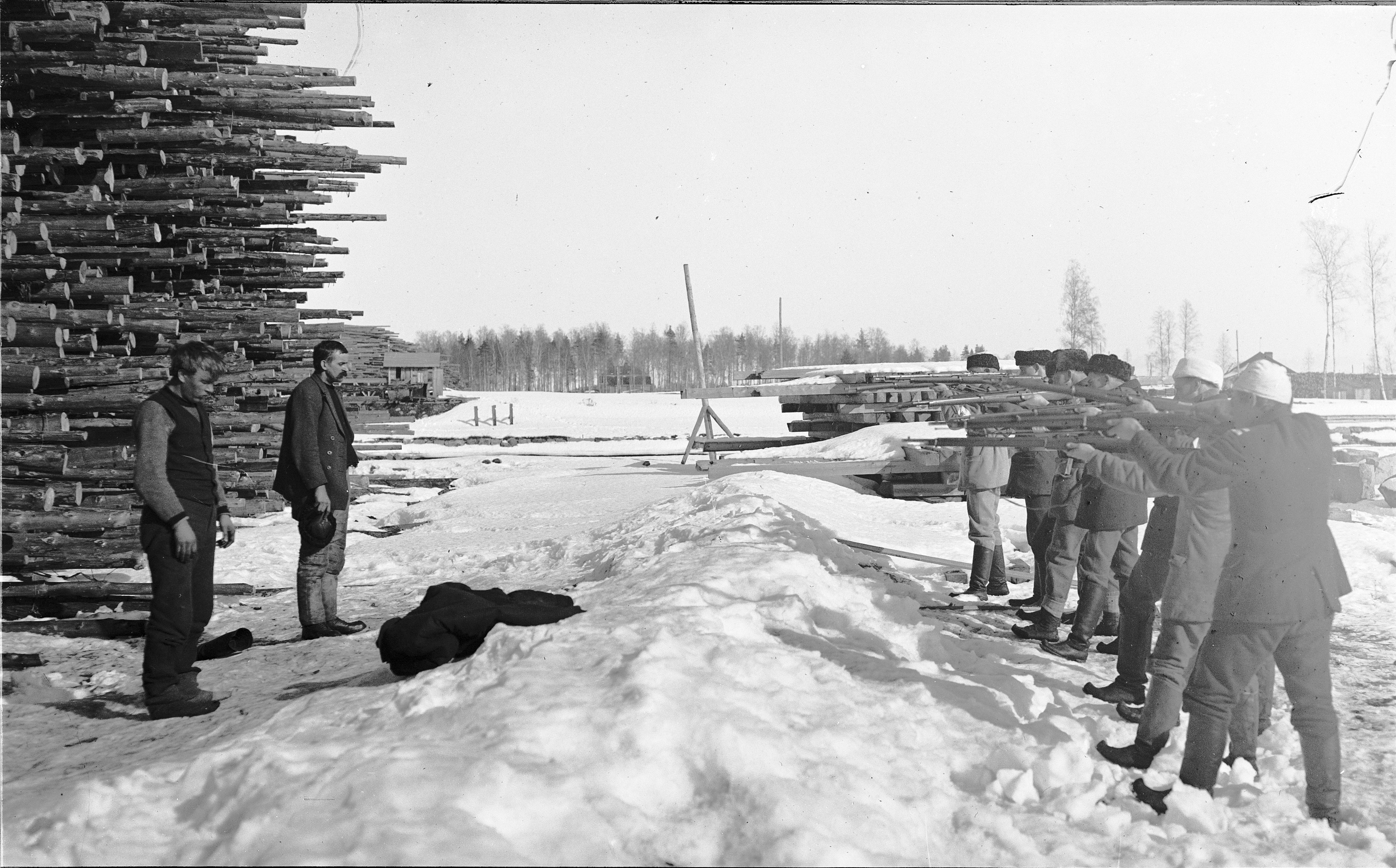
Two Reds being executed by Whites in Varkaus in 1918

Both Whites and Reds carried out political violence through executions, respectively termed White Terror (Finnish: valkoinen terrori; Swedish: vit terror) and Red Terror (Finnish: punainen terrori; Swedish: röd terror). The threshold of political violence had been crossed by the militant Finnish activists from both the elite and the working class during the First Period of Russification in the Finnish Grand Duchy. Large-scale terror operations were born and bred in Europe during World War I, the first total war. The February and October Revolutions initiated similar violence in Finland: at first by Russian army troops executing their officers, and then later between the Finnish Whites and Reds.

The terror consisted of a calculated aspect of general warfare and, on the other hand, the local, personal murders and corresponding acts of revenge. In the former, the commanding staff planned and organised the actions and gave orders to the lower ranks. At least a third of the Red terror and most of the White terror was centrally led. In February 1918, a Desk of Securing Occupied Areas was implemented by the highest-ranking White staff, and the White troops were given Instructions for Wartime Judicature, later called the Shoot on the Spot Declaration. This order authorised field commanders to execute essentially anyone they saw fit. No order by the less-organised, highest Red Guard leadership authorising Red Terror has been found.

The main goals of the terror were to destroy the command structure of the enemy; to clear and secure the areas governed and occupied by armies; and to create shock and fear among the civil population and the enemy soldiers. Additionally, the common troops' paramilitary nature and their lack of combat skills drove them to use political violence as a military weapon. Most of the executions were carried out by cavalry units called Flying Patrols, consisting of 10 to 80 soldiers aged 15 to 20 and led by an experienced, adult leader with absolute authority. The patrols, specialised in search and destroy operations and death squad tactics, were similar to German Sturmbattalions and Russian Assault units organized during World War I. The terror achieved some of its objectives but also gave additional motivation to fight against an enemy perceived to be inhuman and cruel. Both Red and White propaganda made effective use of their opponents' actions, increasing the spiral of revenge.

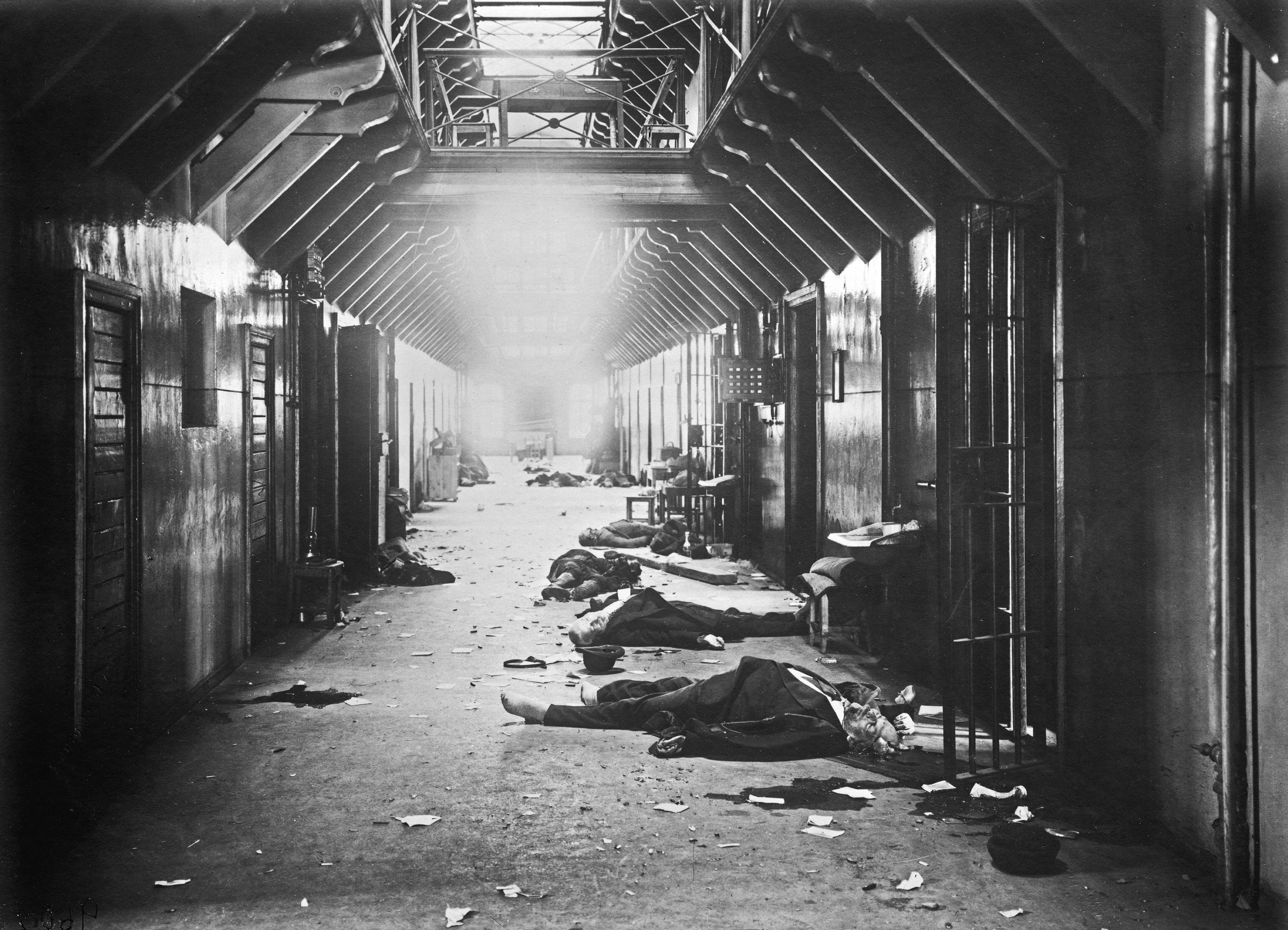
Red Terror in April 1918: the Viipuri county jail massacre, where 30 White prisoners were killed

The Red Guards executed influential Whites, including politicians, major landowners, industrialists, police officers, civil servants and teachers as well as White Guards. Ten priests of the Evangelical Lutheran Church and 90 moderate socialists were killed. The number of executions varied over the war months, peaking in February as the Reds secured power, but March saw low counts because the Reds could not seize new areas outside of the original frontlines. The numbers rose again in April as the Reds aimed to leave Finland. The two major centres for Red Terror were Toijala and Kouvola, where 300–350 Whites were executed between February and April 1918.

The White Guards executed Red Guard and party leaders, Red troops, socialist members of the Finnish Parliament and local Red administrators, and workers. The numbers varied over the months as the Whites conquered southern Finland. Comprehensive White Terror started with their general offensive in March 1918 and increased constantly. It peaked at the end of the war and declined and ceased after the enemy troops had been transferred to prison camps. During the high point of the executions, between the end of April and the beginning of May, 200 Reds were shot per day. White Terror was decisive against Russian soldiers who assisted the Finnish Reds, and several Russian non-socialist civilians were killed in the Viipuri massacre, the aftermath of the Battle of Viipuri.

In total, 1,500 Whites died as a result of Red Terror, while around 9,000 Reds perished by White Terror, which turned into political cleansing. White victims have been recorded exactly, while the number of Red troops executed immediately after battles remains unclear. Together with the harsh prison-camp treatment of the Reds during 1918, the executions inflicted the deepest mental scars on the Finns, regardless of their political allegiance. Some of those who carried out the killings were traumatised, a phenomenon that was later documented.

=== End ===
On 8 April 1918, after the defeat in Tampere and the German army intervention, the People's Delegation retreated from Helsinki to Viipuri. The loss of Helsinki pushed them to Petrograd on 25 April. The escape of the leadership embittered many Reds, and thousands of them tried to flee to Russia, but most of the refugees were encircled by White and German troops. In the Lahti area they surrendered on 1–2 May. The long Red caravans included women and children, who experienced a desperate, chaotic escape with severe losses due to White attacks. The scene was described as a "road of tears" for the Reds, but for the Whites, the sight of long, enemy caravans heading east was a victorious moment. The Red Guards' last strongholds between the Kouvola and Kotka area fell by 5 May, after the Battle of Ahvenkoski. The war of 1918 ended on 15 May 1918, when the Whites took over Fort Ino, a Russian coastal artillery base on the Karelian Isthmus, from the Russian troops. White Finland and General Mannerheim celebrated the victory with a large military parade in Helsinki on 16 May 1918.

The Red Guards had been defeated. The Finnish labour movement had lost the Civil War, several military leaders committed suicide and a majority of the Reds were sent to prison camps. The Vaasa Senate returned to Helsinki on 4 May 1918, but the capital was under the control of the German Army. White Finland had become a protectorate of the German Empire and General Rüdiger von der Goltz was called "the true Regent of Finland". No armistice or peace negotiations were carried out between the Whites and Reds and an official peace treaty to end the Finnish Civil War was never signed.

== Aftermath and impact ==
=== Prison camps for the Red Prisoners ===
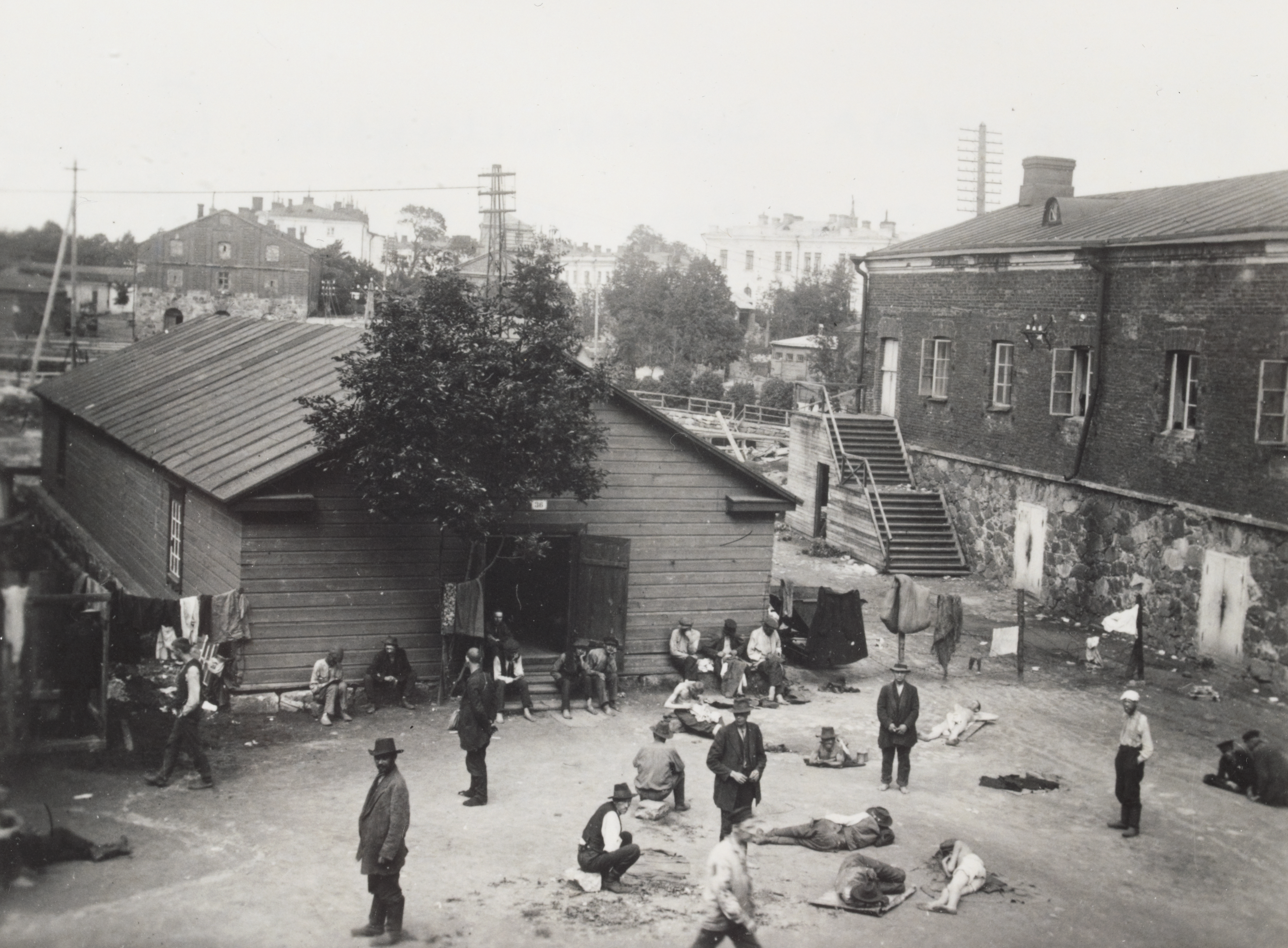
A prison camp for Red prisoners in Suomenlinna, Helsinki. Around 12,500 Red prisoners died in such camps due to malnutrition and disease.

The White Army and German troops captured around 80,000 Red prisoners, including 5,000 women, 1,500 children and 8,000 Russians. The largest prison camps were Suomenlinna (an island facing Helsinki), Hämeenlinna, Lahti, Riihimäki, Tammisaari, Tampere and Viipuri. The Senate decided to keep the prisoners detained until each individual's role in the Civil War had been investigated. Legislation making provision for a Treason Court (Finnish: valtiorikosoikeus; Swedish: domstolen för statsförbrytelser) was enacted on 29 May 1918. The judicature of the 145 inferior courts led by the Supreme Treason Court (Finnish: valtiorikosylioikeus; Swedish: överdomstolen för statsförbrytelser) did not meet the standards of impartiality, due to the condemnatory atmosphere of White Finland. In total 76,000 cases were examined and 68,000 Reds were convicted, primarily for treason; 39,000 were released on parole while the mean-length of punishment for the rest was two to four years in jail. 555 people were sentenced to death, of whom 113 were executed. The trials revealed that some innocent adults had been imprisoned.

Combined with the severe food shortages caused by the Civil War, mass imprisonment led to high mortality rates in the prison camps, and the catastrophe was compounded by the angry, punitive and uncaring mentality of the victors. Sexual violence against women, Red women in particular, is a long-term taboo subject. The number of reliable literary sources is low, while the number of oral sources with varying level of reliability is high. The rape tales of the Hämeenlinna and the Lahti prison camps dominate the reminiscences. Many prisoners felt that they had been abandoned by their own leaders, who had fled to Russia. The physical and mental condition of the prisoners declined in May 1918. Numerous prisoners had been sent to the camps in Tampere and Helsinki in the first half of April and food supplies were disrupted during the Reds' eastward retreat. Consequently, in June 2,900 prisoners starved to death, or died as a result of diseases caused by malnutrition or the Spanish flu: 5,000 in July; 2,200 in August; and 1,000 in September. The mortality rate was highest in the Tammisaari camp at 34 per cent, while the rate varied between 5 per cent and 20 per cent in the others. In total, around 12,500 Finns perished (3,000–4,000 due to the Spanish flu) while detained. Moreover, 600 severely weakened prisoners died soon after release from the camps. In the prisons the dead were buried in mass graves near the camps, e.g. the large grave located in the Kalevankangas Cemetery with around 2,500 victims.

Most prisoners were paroled or pardoned by the end of 1918, after a shift in the political situation. There were 6,100 Red prisoners left at the end of the year and 4,000 at the end of 1919. In January 1920, 3,000 prisoners were pardoned and civil rights were returned to 40,000 former Reds. In 1927, the Social Democratic Party government led by Väinö Tanner pardoned the last 50 prisoners. The Finnish government paid reparations to 11,600 prisoners in 1973. The traumatic hardships of the prison camps increased support for communism in Finland.

=== War-torn nation ===
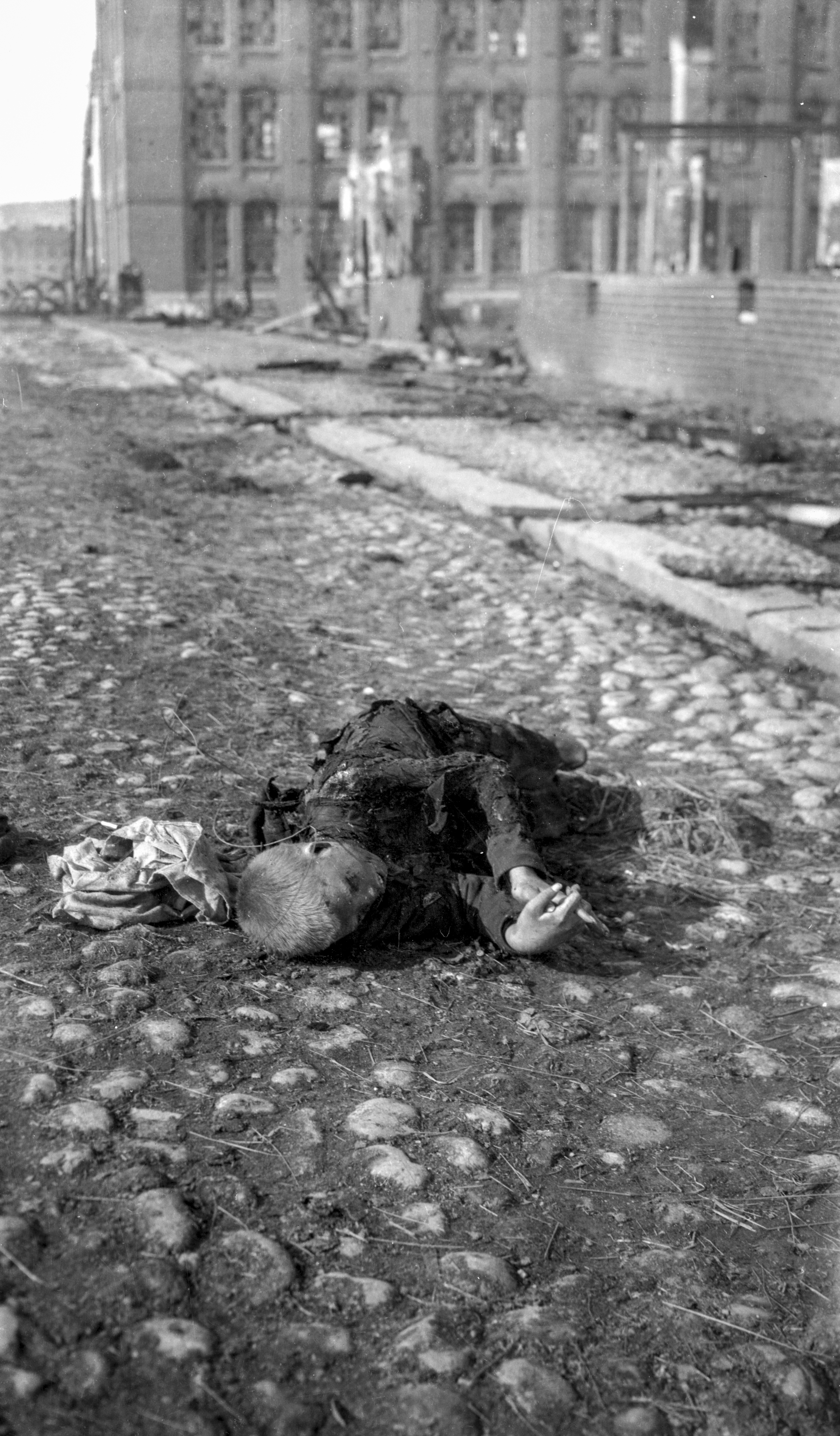
The body of a young boy on Suvantokatu near the intersection of Aleksanterinkatu after the Battle of Tampere.

The Civil War was a catastrophe for Finland: around 35,000 people — 1.2 per cent of the population — perished. The war left approximately 15,000 children orphaned. Most of the casualties occurred outside the battlefields: in the prison camps and the terror campaigns. Many Reds fled to Russia at the end of the war and during the period that followed. The fear, bitterness and trauma caused by the war deepened the divisions within Finnish society and many moderate Finns identified themselves as "citizens of two nations." During the war and after that, the warring sides have been derogatively referred to as "butchers" (for Whites; Finnish: lahtari) and "red russkies" (for Reds; Finnish: punikki or punaryssä) or just "commies".

Together with the Great Famines of 1695–1697 and 1867–1868 the civil war is among the most devastating internal events in the Finns' history. Although the human dignity of a single dead victim and the amount of family's sorrow and longing do not depend on the total scale of a catastrophe, the victim numbers, both as absolute values and proportion of the population in the historical time were higher in the Famines. Yet, the mental burden of the civil war was heavy due to the traumas caused by the political terror and the prison camps for the Reds, and the serious breakdown of social cohesion in the society - including political radicalisation with the birth of more influental communist and fascist factions in Finland. This led e.g. to the murder of the minister of domestic affairs Heikki Ritavuori by the Finnish fascists and the failed attempt of assassination of General Mannerheim by the Finnish communists

In international comparisons the war was the most deadly civil conflict in the world relative to population per month until the Rwandan genocide of 1994, and is the most deadly to have happened in Europe.

The conflict caused disintegration within both socialist and non-socialist factions. The rightward-far right shift of power caused a dispute between conservatives and liberals on the best system of government for Finland to adopt: the former demanded monarchy and restricted parliamentarianism; the latter demanded a democratic republic. Both sides justified their views on political and legal grounds. The monarchists leaned on the Swedish year 1772 monarchist constitution, belittled the Declaration of Independence of 1917, and proposed a modernised, monarchist constitution for Finland. The republicans argued that the 1772 law lost validity in the February Revolution, that the authority of the Russian tsar was assumed by the Finnish Parliament on 15 November 1917, and that the Republic of Finland had been adopted on 6 December that year. The republicans were able to halt the passage of the monarchists' proposal in Parliament. The royalists responded by applying the 1772 law to select a new monarch for the country without reference to Parliament.

The Finnish labour movement was divided into three parts: moderate social democrats in Finland; radical socialists in Finland; and communists in Soviet Russia. The Social Democratic Party had its first official party meeting after the Civil War on 25 December 1918, at which the party proclaimed a commitment to parliamentary means and disavowed Bolshevism and communism. The leaders of Red Finland, who had fled to Russia, established the Communist Party of Finland (SKP) (Finnish: Suomen kommunistinen puolue) in Moscow on 29 August 1918. After the power struggle of 1917 and the bloody civil war, the former Fennomans and the social democrats who had supported "ultra-democratic" means in Red Finland declared a commitment to revolutionary Bolshevism–communism and to the dictatorship of the proletariat, under the control of Lenin. Between the party's creation in 1918 and its official banning in 1930, the Social Democracy Party opposed the activity of the SKP while the Communists influenced socialist and agrarian parliamentary groups. In January 1922, the Socialist Workers' Party of Finland (SSTP), a group of communists and other far-left socialists, had members of its executive committee arrested and later several hundred other members, including members of Parliament arrested in August 1923. In 1925, those arrested were convicted of plotting and assisting treason against the state. In December 1929, Parliament passed bills that further deprived the party of political rights and by November 1930, the party was officially illegal, a policy that would remain until the 1944 Moscow Armistice.

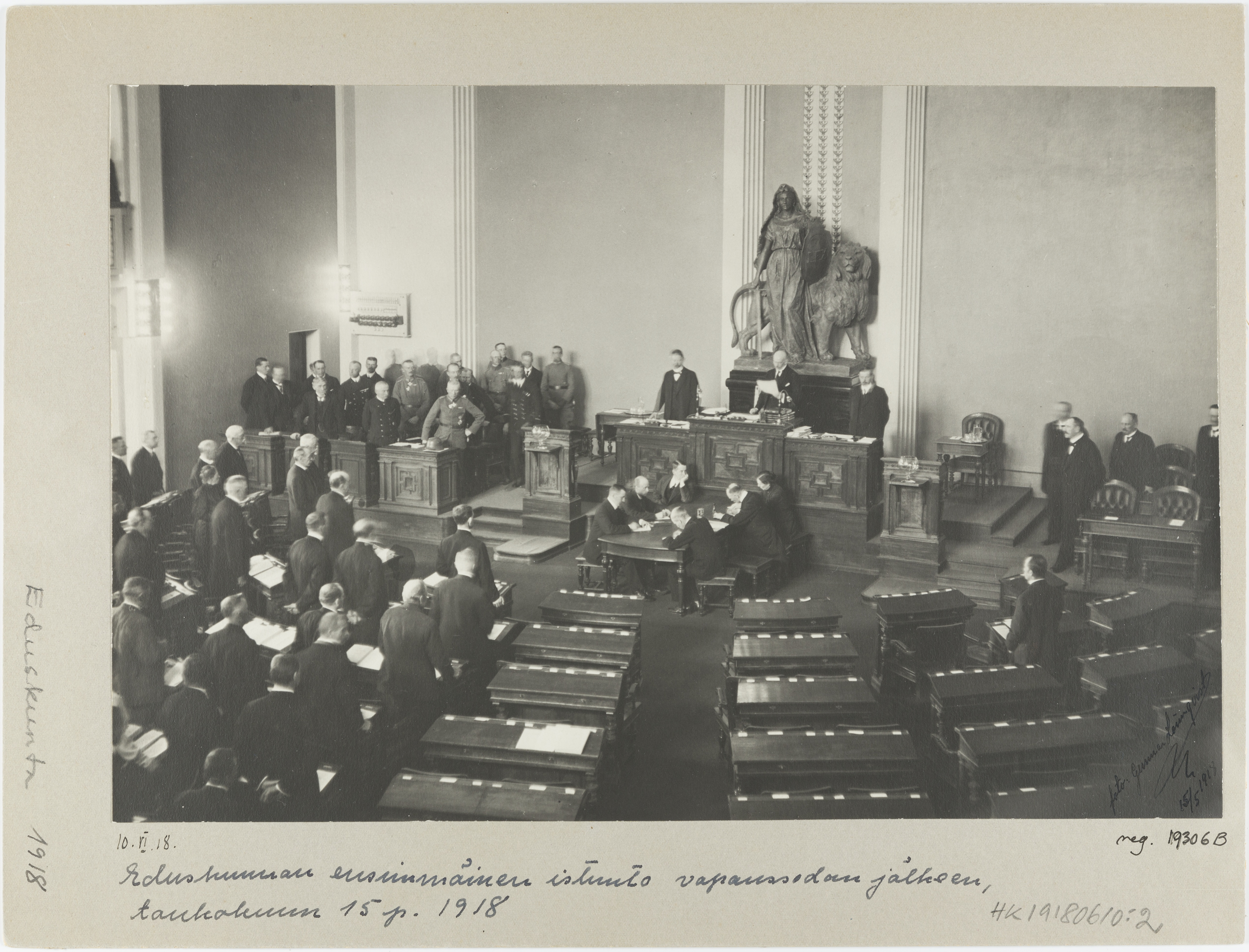
The Rump Parliament of Finland, Helsinki 1918. German army officers stand in the left corner. Social Democrat Matti Paasivuori is on the right, representing Finnish socialists alone.

In May 1918, a conservative-monarchist Senate was formed by J. K. Paasikivi, and the Senate asked the German troops to remain in Finland. 3 March 1918 Treaty of Brest-Litovsk and 7 March German-Finnish agreements bound White Finland to the German Empire's sphere of influence. General Mannerheim resigned his post on 25 May after disagreements with the Senate about German hegemony over Finland, and about his planned attack on Petrograd to repulse the Bolsheviks and capture Russian Karelia. The Germans opposed these plans due to their peace treaties with Lenin. The Civil War weakened the Finnish Parliament; it became a Rump Parliament that included only three socialist representatives.

On 9 October 1918, under pressure from Germany, the Senate and Parliament elected a German prince, Friedrich Karl, the brother-in-law of German Emperor William II, to become the King of Finland. The German leadership was able to utilise the breakdown of Russia for the geopolitical benefit of the German Empire in Fennoscandia also. The Civil War and the aftermath diminished independence of Finland, compared to the status it had held at the turn of the year 1917–1918.

The economic condition of Finland deteriorated drastically from 1918; recovery to pre-conflict levels was achieved only in 1925. The most acute crisis was in food supply, already deficient in 1917, though large-scale starvation had been avoided that year. The Civil War caused marked starvation in southern Finland. Late in 1918, Finnish politician Rudolf Holsti appealed for relief to Herbert Hoover, the American chairman of the Committee for Relief in Belgium. Hoover arranged for the delivery of food shipments and persuaded the Allies to relax their blockade of the Baltic Sea, which had obstructed food supplies to Finland, and to allow food into the country.

=== Compromise and peace ===
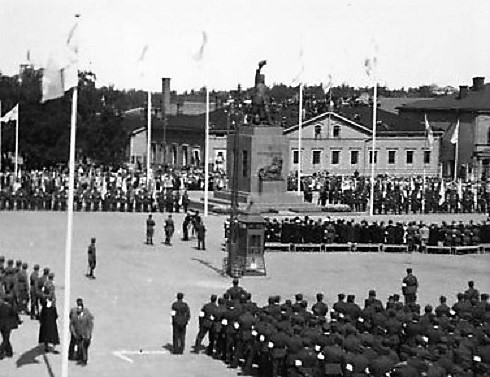
Unveiling of Finland's Statue of Liberty in Vaasa on 9 July 1938, 20 years after the Civil War.

On 15 March 1917, the fate of Finns had been decided outside Finland, in Petrograd. On 11 November 1918, the future of the nation was determined in Berlin, as a result of Germany's surrender to end World War I. The German Empire collapsed in the German Revolution of 1918–1919, caused by lack of food, war-weariness and defeat in the battles of the Western Front. General Rüdiger von der Goltz and his division left Helsinki on 16 December 1918, and Prince Friedrich Karl, who had not yet been crowned, abandoned his role four days later. Finland's status shifted from a monarchist protectorate of the German Empire to an independent republic. The new system of government was confirmed by the Constitution Act (Finnish: Suomen hallitusmuoto; Swedish: regeringsform för Finland) on 17 July 1919.

The first local elections based on universal suffrage in Finland were held during 17–28 December 1918, and the first free parliamentary election took place after the Civil War on 3 March 1919. The United States and the United Kingdom recognised Finnish sovereignty on 6–7 May 1919. The Western powers demanded the establishment of democratic republics in post-war Europe, to lure the masses away from widespread revolutionary movements. The Finno–Russian Treaty of Tartu was signed on 14 October 1920, with the aim of stabilizing political relations between Finland and Russia and settling the border question.

In April 1918, the leading Finnish social liberal and the eventual first President of Finland, Kaarlo Juho Ståhlberg wrote: "It is urgent to get the life and development in this country back on the path that we had already reached in 1906 and which the turmoil of war turned us away from." Moderate social democrat Väinö Voionmaa agonised in 1919: "Those who still trust in the future of this nation must have an exceptionally strong faith. This young independent country has lost almost everything due to the war." Voionmaa was a vital companion for the leader of the reformed Social Democratic Party, Väinö Tanner.

Santeri Alkio supported moderate politics. His party colleague, Kyösti Kallio urged in his Nivala address of 5 May 1918: "We must rebuild a Finnish nation, which is not divided into the Reds and Whites. We have to establish a democratic Finnish republic, where all the Finns can feel that we are true citizens and members of this society." In the end, many of the moderate Finnish conservatives followed the thinking of National Coalition Party member Lauri Ingman, who wrote in early 1918: "A political turn more to the right will not help us now, instead it would strengthen the support of socialism in this country."

Together with other broad-minded Finns, the new partnership constructed a Finnish compromise which eventually delivered a stable and broad parliamentary democracy. The compromise was based both on the defeat of the Reds in the Civil War and the fact that most of the Whites' political goals had not been achieved. After foreign forces left Finland, the militant factions of the Reds and the Whites lost their backing, while the pre-1918 cultural and national integrity and the legacy of Fennomania stood out among the Finns. Furthermore, it has been estimated, that around one million Finns of the total population of three million had been more or less involved in the civil war. The "silent" majority of the nation composed of moderate supporters of the political left, right and centre and non-political (often deeply religious Christian) Finns, and they all may have supported peaceful means to solve the political problems raised in 1917. After the conflict this may have been among the important factors in terms of reaching the social compromises and the return to peace in the society.

The crucial foreign political factor was the weakness of both Germany and Russia after World War I. It empowered Finland and made a more balanced domestic Finnish social and political settlement possible. A reconciliation process led to a slow and painful, but steady, national unification. In the end, the power vacuum and interregnum of 1917–1919 gave way to the Finnish compromise. From 1919 to the present, the democracy, the internal Pax Finlandia and sovereignty of the Finns withstood challenges from right-wing and left-wing political radicalism, the Soviet invasion of 1939 and the other crisis of World War II (originated from the Molotov-Ribbentrop pact of 1939), pressure from the Soviet Union during the Cold War and threat of Russia in Bellum Russica since 2014.

== In popular culture ==
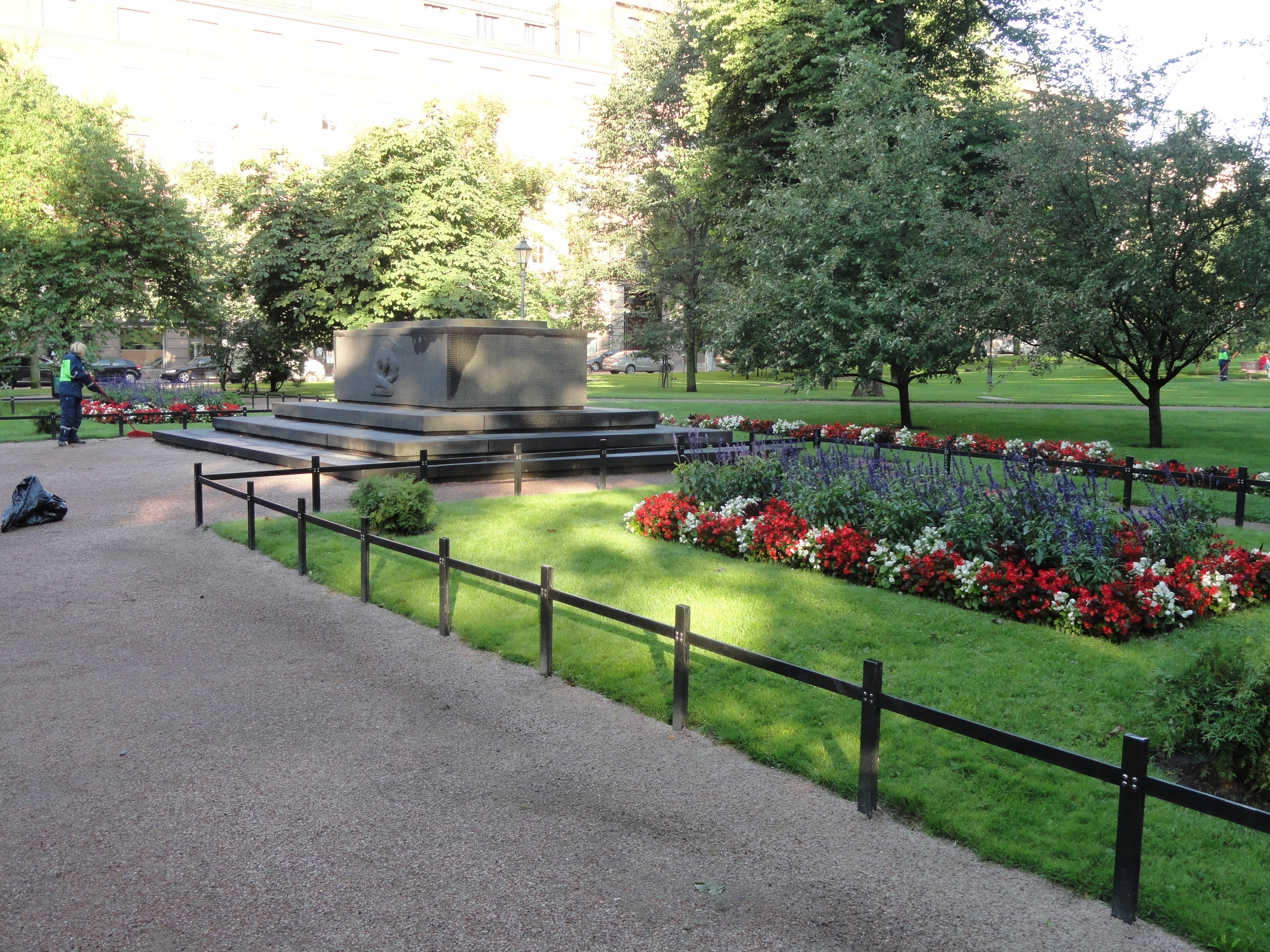
Memorial to German troops who died in Battle of Helsinki, located near Helsinki Old Church.

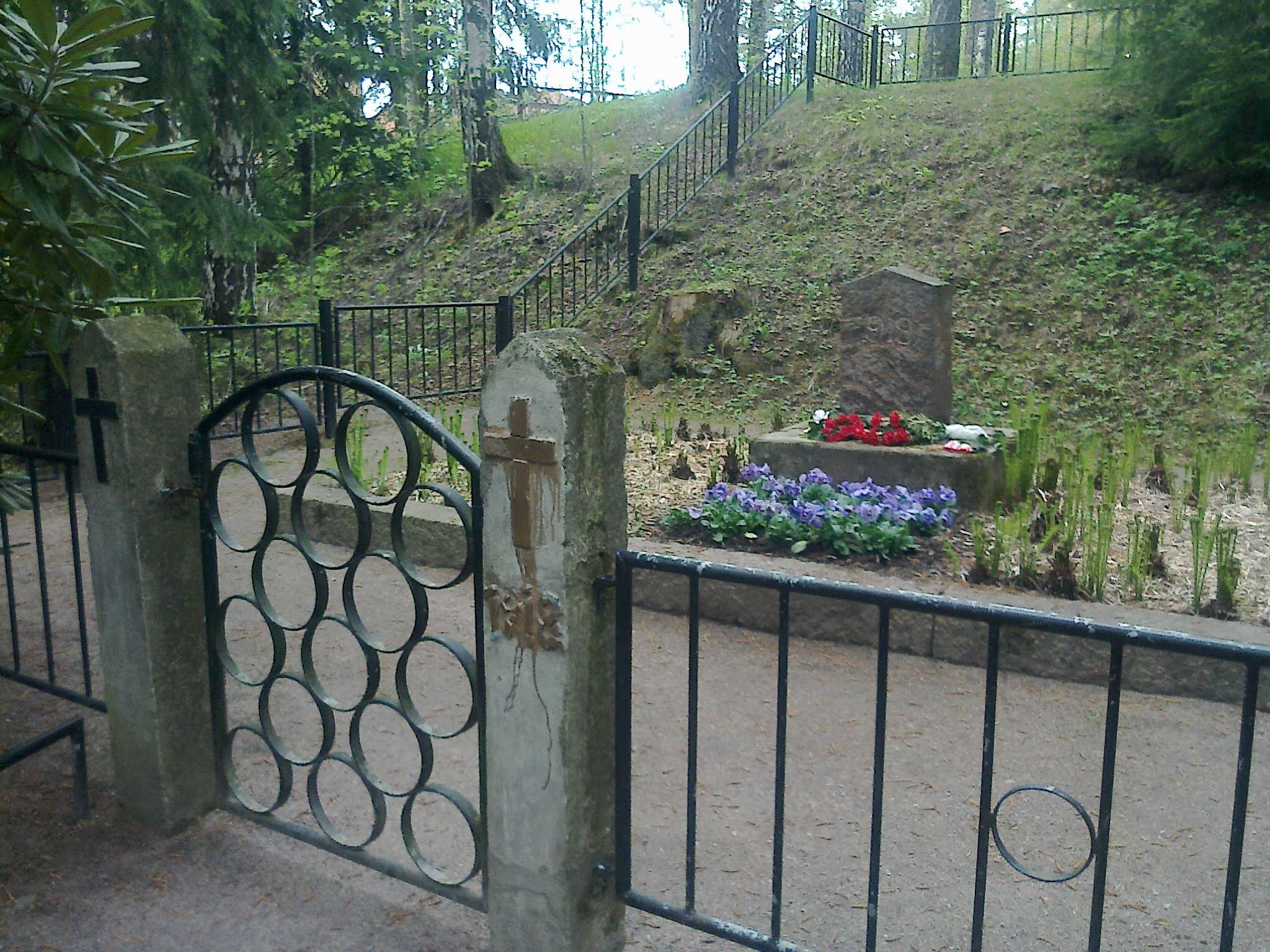
A mass grave for Red soldiers and civilians in North Haaga, Helsinki

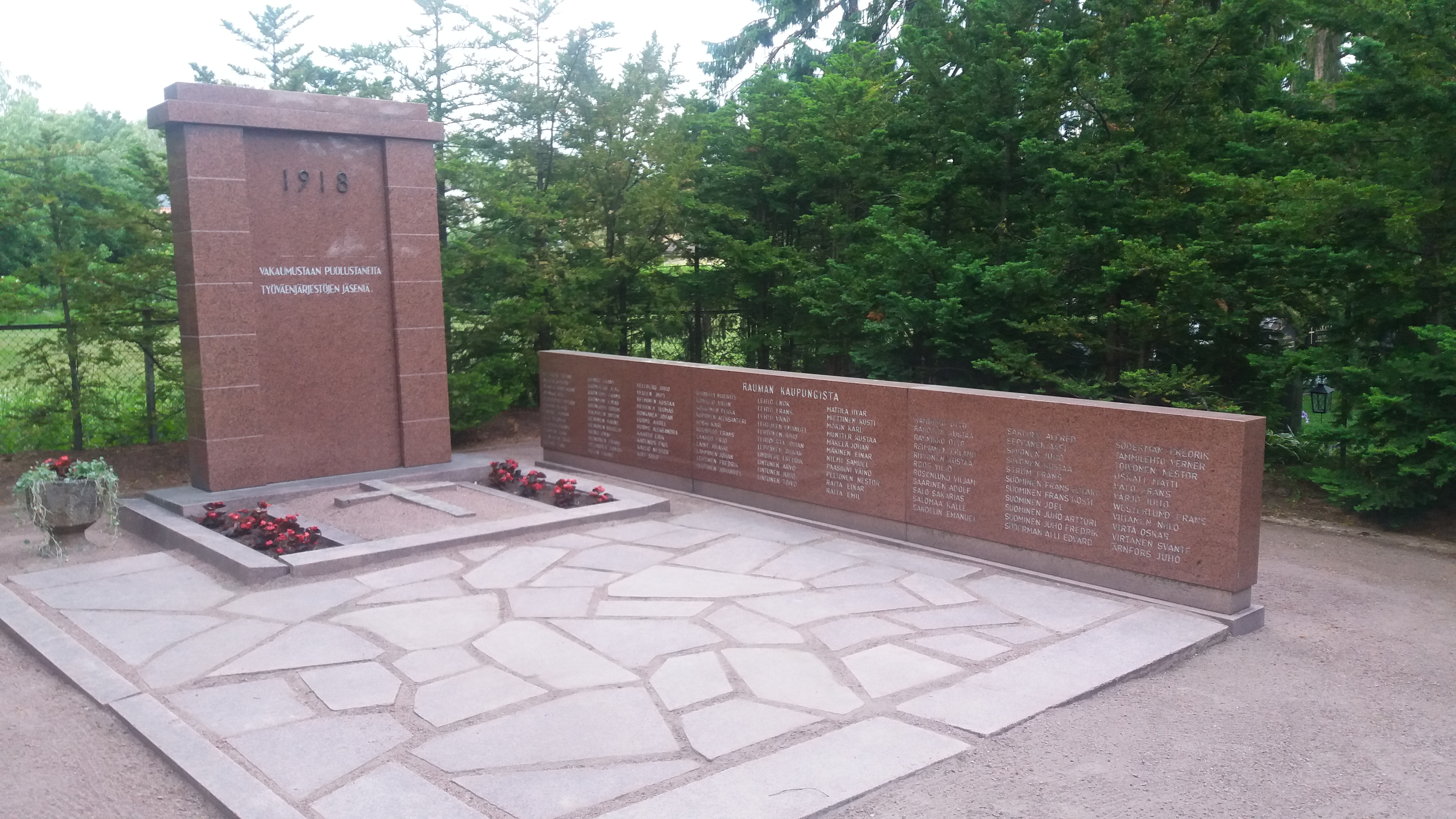
Memorial at mass grave of Red Guards who died in the Finnish Civil War, in Rauma. The monument was erected in 1946.

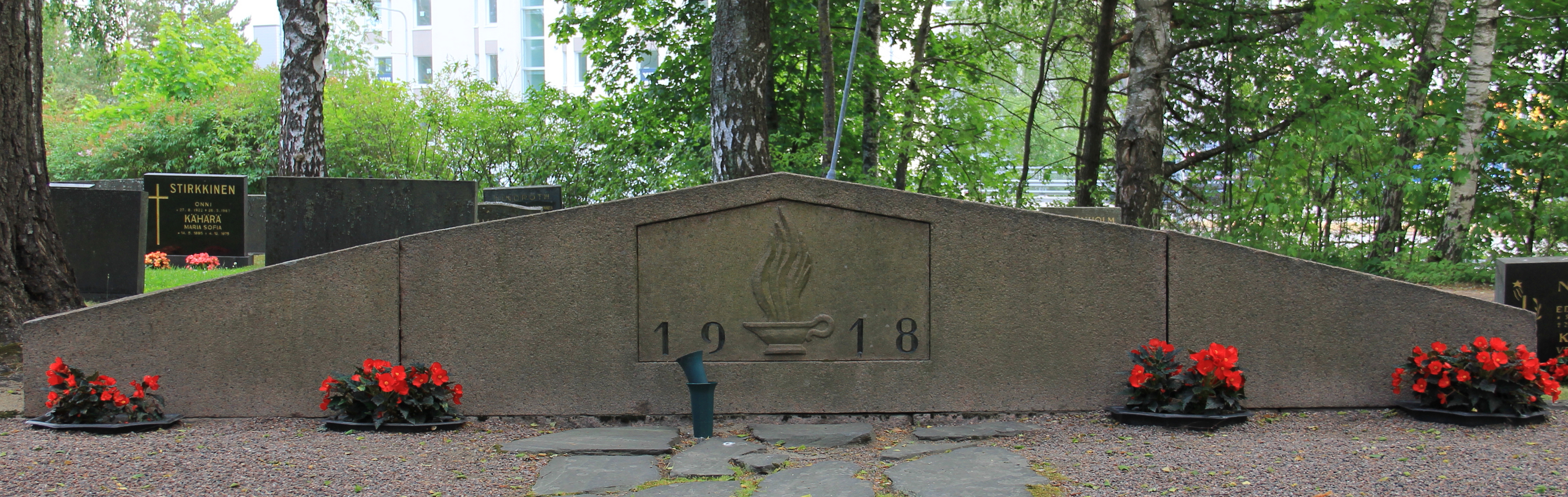
Memorial at mass grave of Red Guards who died in the Finnish Civil War, in Porvoo.

=== Literature ===
Despite the fact that the Civil War was one of the most sensitive and controversial topics more than a hundred years later in Finland, still between 1918 and the 1950s, mainstream literature and poetry presented the 1918 war from the White victors' point of view, with works such as the "Psalm of the Cannons" (Finnish: Tykkien virsi) by Arvi Järventaus in 1918. In poetry, Bertel Gripenberg, who had volunteered for the White Army, celebrated its cause in "The Great Age" (Swedish: Den stora tiden) in 1928 and V. A. Koskenniemi in "Young Anthony" (Finnish: Nuori Anssi) in 1918. The war tales of the Reds were kept silent.

The first neutrally critical books were written soon after the war, notably, "Devout Misery" (Finnish: Hurskas kurjuus) written by the Nobel Prize laureate Frans Emil Sillanpää in 1919; "Dead Apple Trees" (Finnish: Kuolleet omenapuut) by Joel Lehtonen in 1918; and "Homecoming" (Swedish: Hemkomsten) by Runar Schildt in 1919. These were followed by Jarl Hemmer in 1931 with the book "A Man and His Conscience" (Swedish: En man och hans samvete) and Oiva Paloheimo in 1942 with "Restless Childhood" (Finnish: Levoton lapsuus). Lauri Viita's book "Scrambled Ground" (Finnish: Moreeni) from 1950 presented the life and experiences of a worker family in the Tampere of 1918, including a point of view from outsiders to the Civil War.

Between 1959 and 1962, Väinö Linna described in his trilogy "Under the North Star" (Finnish: Täällä Pohjantähden alla) the Civil War and World War II from the viewpoint of the common people. Part II of Linna's work opened a larger view of these events and included tales of the Reds in the 1918 war. At the same time, a new outlook on the war was opened by Paavo Haavikko's book "Private Matters" (Finnish: Yksityisiä asioita), Veijo Meri's "The Events of 1918" (Finnish: Vuoden 1918 tapahtumat) and Paavo Rintala's "My Grandmother and Mannerheim" (Finnish: Mummoni ja Mannerheim), all published in 1960. In poetry, Viljo Kajava, who had experienced the Battle of Tampere at the age of nine, presented a pacifist view of the Civil War in his "Poems of Tampere" (Finnish: Tampereen runot) in 1966. The same battle is described in the novel "Corpse Bearer" (Finnish: Kylmien kyytimies) by Antti Tuuri from 2007. The multilayered "Malmi 1917" (2013) by Jenni Linturi describes contradictory emotions and attitudes in a village drifting towards civil war.

Väinö Linna's trilogy turned the general tide, and after it, several books were written mainly from the Red viewpoint: The Tampere-trilogy by Erkki Lepokorpi in 1977; "Juho 18" by Juhani Syrjä in 1998; "The Command" (Finnish: Käsky) by Leena Lander in 2003; and "Sandra" by Heidi Köngäs in 2017. Kjell Westö's epic novel "Where We Once Went" (Swedish: Där vi en gång gått), published in 2006, deals with the period of 1915–1930 from both the Red and the White sides. Westö's book "Mirage 38" (Swedish: Hägring 38) from 2013, describes post-war traumas of the 1918 war and Finnish mentality in the 1930s. Many of the stories have been utilised in motion pictures and in theatre.

=== Cinema and television ===
The Civil War and the literature about it has inspired many Finnish filmmakers to take it the subject for the film and television adaptations. As early as 1957, 1918, a film directed by Toivo Särkkä and based on Jarl Hemmer's play and novel A Man and His Conscience, was screened at the 7th Berlin International Film Festival. The most recent films about the civil war include the 2007 film The Border, directed by Lauri Törhönen, and the 2008 film Tears of April, directed by Aku Louhimies and based on Leena Lander's novel The Command. However, perhaps the most famous film about the Finnish Civil War is the 1968 film Here, Beneath the North Star, directed by Edvin Laine and based on the first two books of Väinö Linna's Under the North Star trilogy.

In 2012, the dramatized documentary Dead or Alive 1918 (or The Battle of Näsilinna 1918; Finnish: Taistelu Näsilinnasta 1918) was made, which tells the story of the Battle of Tampere during the Civil War. Other noteworthy documentary-styled films about the Finnish Civil War include The Mommila Murders from 1973, Trust from 1976, and Flame Top from 1980.

=== Games ===
In 2020, GMT Games released a strategy-based board game entitled All Bridges Burning: Red Revolt and White Guard in Finland, 1917-18 in the tenth volume of their COIN series, which emulated the conflict of the civil war.

== See also ==
- List of states and regions involved in the Russian Civil War
- Bibliography of the Russian Revolution and Civil War
- Outline of the Russian Revolution and Civil War
- Åland War
- Aarne Arvonen
- Estonian War of Independence
- Finnish War
- History of Finland
- Kagal (Finnish resistance movement)
- List of Finnish wars
- Lotta Svärd
- Mensheviks
- Ukrainian War of Independence
- Winter War

== Bibliography ==
=== English ===
- Ahlbäck, Anders (2014). "Masculinities and the Ideal Warrior: Images of the Jäger Movement". In Tepora, T.; Roselius, A. (eds.). The Finnish Civil War 1918: History, Memory, Legacy. Leiden: Brill. pp. 254–293. ISBN 978-90-04-24366-8.
- Alapuro, Risto (1988). State and Revolution in Finland. Berkeley: University of California Press. ISBN 0-520-05813-5.
- Gerrard, Craig (2000). "The foreign office and British intervention in the Finnish civil war". Civil Wars. 3 (3): 87–100. doi:10.1080/13698240008402448. S2CID 143499598.
- Haapala, Pertti; Tikka, Marko (2013). "Revolution, Civil War and Terror in Finland in 1918". In Gerwarth, Robert; Horne, John (eds.). War in Peace: Paramilitary Violence in Europe after the Great War. Oxford: Oxford University Press. pp. 72–84. ISBN 978-0-19-968605-6.
- Haapala, Pertti (2014). "The Expected and Non-Expected Roots of Chaos: Preconditions of the Finnish Civil War". In Tepora, T.; Roselius, A. (eds.). The Finnish Civil War 1918: History, Memory, Legacy. Leiden: Brill. pp. 21–50. ISBN 978-90-04-24366-8.
- Jussila, Osmo; Hentilä, Seppo; Nevakivi, Jukka (1999). From Grand Duchy to a Modern State: A Political History of Finland since 1809. C. Hurst & Co. ISBN 1-85065-528-6.
- Hodgson, John (1970). "The Finnish Communist Party". Slavic Review. 29 (1): 70–85. doi:10.2307/2493091. JSTOR 2493091. S2CID 163842405.
- Jutikkala, Eino; Pirinen, Kauko (2003). A History of Finland. Werner Söderström Osakeyhtiö (WSOY). ISBN 951-0-27911-0.
- Kirby, David (2006). A Concise History of Finland. Cambridge University Press. ISBN 0-521-83225-X.
- Larsen, Mads (2020). "Agreeing on History: Adaptation as Restorative Truth in Finnish Reconciliation". Literature/Film Quarterly. 48 (1). ISSN 0090-4260.
- Lintunen, Tiina (2014). "Women at War". In Tepora, T.; Roselius, A. (eds.). The Finnish Civil War 1918: History, Memory, Legacy. Leiden: Brill. pp. 201–229. ISBN 978-90-04-24366-8.
- McMeekin, Sean (2017). The Russian Revolution: A New History. London: Profile Books. ISBN 978-1-78125-902-3.
- Payne, Stanley G. (2011). Civil War in Europe, 1905–1949. New York: Cambridge University Press. ISBN 978-1-107-64815-9.
- Pipes, Richard (1996). A Concise History of the Russian Revolution. New York: Vintage Books. ISBN 0-679-74544-0.
- Roselius, Aapo (2014). "Holy War: Finnish Irredentist Campaigns in the aftermath of the Civil War". In Tepora, T.; Roselius, A. (eds.). The Finnish Civil War 1918: History, Memory, Legacy. Leiden: Brill. pp. 119–155. ISBN 978-90-04-24366-8.
- Saarela, Tauno (2014). "To Commemorate or Not: The Finnish Labor Movement and the Memory of the Civil War in the Interwar Period". In Tepora, T.; Roselius, A. (eds.). The Finnish Civil War 1918: History, Memory, Legacy. Leiden: Brill. pp. 331–363. ISBN 978-90-04-24366-8.
- Siltala, Juha (2014). "Being absorded into an Unintended War". In Tepora, T.; Roselius, A. (eds.). The Finnish Civil War 1918: History, Memory, Legacy. Leiden: Brill. pp. 51–89. ISBN 978-90-04-24366-8.
- Tepora, Tuomas (2014). "Changing Perceptions of 1918: World War II and the Post-War Rise of the Left". In Tepora, T.; Roselius, A. (eds.). The Finnish Civil War 1918: History, Memory, Legacy. Leiden: Brill. pp. 364–400. ISBN 978-90-04-24366-8.
- Tepora, Tuomas; Roselius, Aapo (2014a). The Finnish Civil War 1918: History, Memory, Legacy. Leiden: Brill. ISBN 978-90-04-24366-8.
- Tepora, Tuomas; Roselius, Aapo (2014b). "The Finnish Civil War, Revolution and Scholarship". In Tepora, T.; Roselius, A. (eds.). The Finnish Civil War 1918: History, Memory, Legacy. Leiden: Brill. pp. 1–16. ISBN 978-90-04-24366-8.
- Tikka, Marko (2014). "Warfare & Terror in 1918". In Tepora, T.; Roselius, A. (eds.). The Finnish Civil War 1918: History, Memory, Legacy. Leiden: Brill. pp. 90–118. ISBN 978-90-04-24366-8.
- Trotsky, Leon (1934). History of the Russian Revolution. London: The Camelot Press ltd.
- Upton, Anthony F. (1973). The Communist Parties of Scandinavia and Finland. London: Weidenfeld & Nicolson. ISBN 0-297-99542-1.
- Upton, Anthony F. (1980b). The Finnish Revolution 1917–1918. Minneapolis: University of Minnesota Press. ISBN 0-8166-0905-5.

=== Finnish ===
- Aamulehti (30 March 2008). "Suomalaisten valinnat vuoden 1918 sodan nimestä" [Finns' choices about the name of the 1918 war]. Su Asiat (in Finnish).
- Ahto, Sampo [in Finnish] (1993). "Sotaretkillä" [On military expeditions]. In Manninen, O. (ed.). Itsenäistymisen vuodet 1917–1920, II Taistelu vallasta [The years of independence 1917–1920, II Struggle for power] (in Finnish). Helsinki: Valtion painatuskeskus. pp. 180–445. ISBN 951-37-0728-8.
- Alapuro, Risto (1992). "Valta ja valtio – miksi vallasta tuli ongelma 1900-luvun vaihteessa" [Power and the state - why power became a problem at the turn of the 20th century]. In Haapala, P. (ed.). Talous, valta ja valtio. Tutkimuksia 1800-luvun Suomesta [Economy, power and the state. Studies on 19th century Finland] (in Finnish). Tampere: Vastapaino. pp. 251–267. ISBN 951-9066-53-5.
- Apunen, Osmo [in Finnish] (1987). "Rajamaasta tasavallaksi" [From a borderland to a republic]. In Avikainen, P.; Hetemäki, I.; Pärssinen, E. (eds.). Suomen historia 6, Sortokaudet ja itsenäistyminen [History of Finland 6, Periods of oppression and independence] (in Finnish). Espoo: Weilin & Göös. pp. 47–404. ISBN 951-35-2495-7.
- Arimo, Reino [in Finnish] (1991). Saksalaisten sotilaallinen toiminta Suomessa 1918 [German military activity in Finland 1918] (in Finnish). Jyväskylä: Gummerus. ISBN 978-951-96-1744-2.
- Aro, Tuuve (29 November 2007), "Raja 1918", MTV3.fi (in Finnish), Bonnier Group, archived from the original on 22 June 2012
- Aunesluoma, Juhana; Häikiö, Martti (1995). Suomen vapaussota 1918. Kartasto ja tutkimusopas [Finnish War of Independence 1918. Atlas and research guide] (in Finnish). Porvoo: WSOY. ISBN 951-0-20174-X.
- Bremer, Aarne (1934). Ilmavoimien osallistuminen Suomen vapaussotaan vuonna 1918 [Air Force participation in the Finnish War of Independence in 1918] (in Finnish). Otava. pp. 203–226.
- Eerola, Jari; Eerola, Jouni (1998). Henkilötappiot Suomen sisällissodassa 1918 [Casualties in the Finnish Civil War of 1918] (in Finnish). Turenki: Jaarli. ISBN 978-952-91-0001-9.
- Eerola, Jouni (2010). "Punaisen Suomen panssarijunat. In: Perko, T. (ed.) Sotahistoriallinen Aikakauskirja 29" [Armored trains of Red Finland. In: Perko, T. (ed.) War history periodical 29]. Sotahistoriallinen Aikakauskirja [Journal of Military History] (in Finnish). Helsinki: Suomen Sotahistoriallinen seura: 123–165. ISSN 0357-816X.
- Elomaa, Pekka; Kemppainen, Jouni K. (2007). Paha maisema [Evil Landscape] (in Finnish). Hämeenlinna: Karisto. ISBN 978-952-5557-18-3.
- Engman, Max (2009). Pitkät jäähyväiset. Suomi Ruotsin ja Venäjän välissä vuoden 1809 jälkeen [A long farewell. Finland between Sweden and Russia after 1809] (in Finnish). Helsinki: WSOY. ISBN 978-951-0-34880-2.
- Haapala, Pertti (1992). "Työväenluokan synty" [The birth of the working class]. In Haapala, P. (ed.). Talous, valta ja valtio. Tutkimuksia 1800-luvun Suomesta [Economy, power and the state. Studies on 19th century Finland] (in Finnish). Tampere: Vastapaino. pp. 227–249. ISBN 951-9066-53-5.
- Haapala, Pertti (1993). "Luokkasota" [Class war]. Historiallinen Aikakauskirja (in Finnish) (2). Archived from the original on 6 November 2002.
- Haapala, Pertti (1995). Kun yhteiskunta hajosi, Suomi 1914–1920 [When society fell apart, Finland 1914–1920] (in Finnish). Helsinki: Edita. ISBN 951-37-1532-9.
- Haapala, Pertti (2008). "Monta totuutta" [Many truths]. In Hoppu, T.; Haapala, P.; Antila, K.; Honkasalo, M.; Lind, M.; Liuttunen, A.; Saloniemi, M-R. (eds.). Tampere 1918 (in Finnish). Tampere: Tampereen museot. pp. 255–261. ISBN 978-951-609-369-0.
- Haapala, Pertti (2009a), Yhteiskunnallinen kompromissi. In: Haapala, P. & Hoppu, T. (eds.) Sisällissodan pikkujättiläinen, Helsinki: WSOY, pp. 395–404, ISBN 978-951-0-35452-0
- Haapala, Pertti (2009b), Kun kansankirkko hajosi. In: Huhta, I. (ed.) Sisällissota 1918 ja kirkko, Helsinki: Suomen Kirkkohistoriallinen seura, pp. 17–23, ISBN 978-952-5031-55-3
- Haapala, Pertti; Tikka, Marko; Wassholm, Johanna; Östman, Ann-Catrin (2021), Poliittiset voimat: Säädyt, kansa, puolueet ja sotilaat. In: Karonen, P., Villstrand N.E., Haapala, P. (eds.) Suomalaisen yhteiskunnan historia 1400-2000. Osa 1 Rakenteet ja instituutiot., Tampere: Vastapaino, pp. 265–298, ISBN 978-951-768-900-7
- Haapala, Pertti; Markkola, Pirjo (2021), Kun yhteiskunta selviytyi: Vuosisadan kolme kriisiä. In: Karonen, P., Villstrand N.E., Haapala, P. (eds.) Suomalaisen yhteiskunnan historia 1400-2000. Osa 1 Rakenteet ja instituutiot., Tampere: Vastapaino, pp. 341–373, ISBN 978-951-768-900-7
- Helsingin Sanomat (19 October 2017). "Kirja-arvostelu: Heidi Köngäs, Sandra" [Book review: Heidi Köngäs, Sandra]. Kulttuuri (in Finnish).
- Hentilä, Marjaliisa; Hentilä, Seppo (2016). Saksalainen Suomi 1918 [German Finland 1918] (in Finnish). Helsinki: Siltala. ISBN 978-952-234-384-0.
- Hokkanen, Kari (1986). Kyösti Kallio I (1873–1929) (in Finnish). Porvoo: WSOY. ISBN 951-0-13876-2.
- Hoppu, Tuomas [in Finnish] (2008a). "Venäläisten upseerien kohtalo" [The fate of Russian officers]. In Hoppu, T. [in Finnish]; Haapala, P.; Antila, K.; Honkasalo, M.; Lind, M.; Liuttunen, A.; Saloniemi, M-R. (eds.). Tampere 1918 (in Finnish). Tampere: Tampereen museot. pp. 188–199. ISBN 978-951-609-369-0.
- Hoppu, Tuomas [in Finnish] (2008b). "Tampere – sodan katkerin taistelu" [Tampere – the bitterest battle of the war]. In Hoppu, T. [in Finnish]; Haapala, P.; Antila, K.; Honkasalo, M.; Lind, M.; Liuttunen, A.; Saloniemi, M-R. (eds.). Tampere 1918 (in Finnish). Tampere: Tampereen museot. pp. 96–161. ISBN 978-951-609-369-0.
- Hoppu, Tuomas [in Finnish] (2009a), Sisällissodan puhkeaminen. In: Haapala, P. & Hoppu, T. (eds.) Sisällissodan pikkujättiläinen, Helsinki: WSOY, pp. 92–111, ISBN 978-951-0-35452-0
- Hoppu, Tuomas [in Finnish] (2009b), Taistelevat osapuolet ja johtajat. In: Haapala, P. & Hoppu, T. (eds.) Sisällissodan pikkujättiläinen, Helsinki: WSOY, pp. 112–143, ISBN 978-951-0-35452-0
- Hoppu, Tuomas [in Finnish] (2009c), Valkoisten voitto. In: Haapala, P. & Hoppu, T. (eds.) Sisällissodan pikkujättiläinen, Helsinki: WSOY, pp. 199–223, ISBN 978-951-0-35452-0
- Hoppu, Tuomas [in Finnish] (2013). Vallatkaa Helsinki. Saksan hyökkäys punaiseen pääkaupunkiin 1918 [Conquer Helsinki. German attack on the red capital in 1918] (in Finnish). Juva: Gummerus. ISBN 978-951-20-9130-0.
- Hoppu, Tuomas [in Finnish] (2017). Sisällissodan naiskaartit. Suomalaiset naiset aseissa 1918 [Women's Guards of the Civil War. Finnish women in arms 1918] (in Finnish). Juva: Gummerus. ISBN 978-951-24-0559-6.
- Hoppu, Tuomas; Nieminen, Jarmo; Tukkinen, Tauno (2018). Sisällissodan taistelut. Kaatunut, kadonnut, teloitettu. Jelgava: Gummerus. ISBN 978-951-24-1186-3.
- Huhta, Ilkka (2009). Sisällissota 1918 ja kirkko [Civil war 1918 and the church] (in Finnish). Helsinki: Suomen Kirkkohistoriallinen seura. ISBN 978-952-5031-55-3.
- Häggman, Kai (2017), Kynällä ja kiväärillä. In: Häggman, K., Keskisarja, T., Kuisma, M. & Kukkonen, J. 1917. Suomen ihmisten vuosi, Helsinki: WSOY, pp. 157–217, ISBN 978-951-0-42701-9
- Jussila, Osmo (2007), Suomen historian suuret myytit, Helsinki: WSOY, ISBN 978-951-0-33103-3
- Jutikkala, Eino (1995), Maaliskuun vallankumouksesta toukokuun paraatiin 1918. In: Aunesluoma, J. & Häikiö, M. (eds.) Suomen vapaussota 1918. Kartasto ja tutkimusopas, Porvoo: WSOY, pp. 11–20, ISBN 951-0-20174-X
- Jyränki, Antero (2014), Kansa kahtia, henki halpaa. Oikeus sisällissodan Suomessa?, Helsinki: Art House, ISBN 978-951-884-520-4
- Kalela, Jorma (2008a), Miten Suomi syntyi?. In: Pernaa, V. & Niemi, K. Mari (eds.) Suomalaisen yhteiskunnan poliittinen historia, Helsinki: Edita, pp. 15–30, ISBN 978-951-37-5321-4
- Kalela, Jorma (2008b), Yhteiskunnallinen kysymys ja porvarillinen reformismi. In: Pernaa, V. & Niemi, K. Mari (eds.) Suomalaisen yhteiskunnan poliittinen historia, Helsinki: Edita, pp. 31–44, ISBN 978-951-37-5321-4
- Kalela, Jorma (2008c), Suomi ja eurooppalainen vallankumousvaihe. In: Pernaa, V. & Niemi, K. Mari (eds.) Suomalaisen yhteiskunnan poliittinen historia, Helsinki: Edita, pp. 95–109, ISBN 978-951-37-5321-4
- Kallioinen, Sami (2009), Kestämättömät sopimukset. Muuramen, Savonlinnan ja Teuvan rauhallisuuteen vaikuttaneiden tekijöiden vertailua kesästä 1917 sisällissotaan 1918, Jyväskylä: Jyväskylän yliopisto, Historian ja etnologian laitos, Pro gradu-tutkielma.
- Karonen, Petri; Frigren, Pirita; Suodenjoki, Sami; Haapala, Pertti (2021), Vuorovaikutus ja poliittinen kulttuuri: Alamaiset, kansalaiset ja valtiovalta. In: Karonen, P., Villstrand N.E., Haapala, P. (eds.) Suomalaisen yhteiskunnan historia 1400-2000. Osa 1 Rakenteet ja instituutiot., Tampere: Vastapaino, pp. 301–338, ISBN 978-951-768-900-7
- Kekkonen, Jukka (2016), Kun aseet puhuvat. Poliittinen väkivalta Espanjan ja Suomen sisällissodissa, Helsinki: Art House, ISBN 978-951-884-586-0
- Keränen, Jorma; Tiainen, Jorma; Ahola, Matti; Ahola, Veikko; Frey, Stina; Lempinen, Jorma; Ojanen, Eero; Paakkonen, Jari; Talja, Virpi; Väänänen, Juha (1992), Suomen itsenäistymisen kronikka, Jyväskylä: Gummerus, ISBN 951-20-3800-5
- Keskisarja, Teemu (2013), Viipuri 1918, Helsinki: Siltala, ISBN 978-952-234-187-7
- Keskisarja, Teemu (2017), Vapauden ja vihan vuosi. In: Häggman, K., Keskisarja, T., Kuisma, M. & Kukkonen, J. 1917. Suomen ihmisten vuosi, Helsinki: WSOY, pp. 13–74, ISBN 978-951-0-42701-9
- Ketola, Eino (1987). Kansalliseen kansanvaltaan. Suomen itsenäisyys, sosiaalidemokraatit ja Venäjän vallankumous 1917 [To the national people's power. Finnish independence, social democrats and the Russian revolution of 1917] (in Finnish). Helsinki: Tammi. ISBN 978-951-30-6728-1.
- Kettunen, Pauli (1986), Poliittinen liike ja sosiaalinen kollektiivisuus: tutkimus sosialidemokratiasta ja ammattiyhdistysliikkeestä Suomessa 1918–1930. Historiallisia tutkimuksia 138, Jyväskylä: Gummerus, ISBN 951-9254-86-2
- Klemettilä, Aimo (1989). "Lenin ja Suomen kansalaissota" [Lenin and the Finnish Civil War]. In Numminen, J.; Apunen, O. [in Finnish]; von Gerich-Porkkala, C.; Jungar, S.; Paloposki, T.; Kallio, V.; Kuusi, H.; Jokela, P.; Veilahti, V. (eds.). Lenin ja Suomi II [Lenin and Finland II] (in Finnish). Helsinki: Valtion painatuskeskus. pp. 163–203. ISBN 951-860-402-9.
- Klinge, Matti (1997). Keisarin Suomi [The Emperor's Finland] (in Finnish). Helsinki: Schildts. ISBN 951-50-0682-1.
- Kolbe, Laura; Nyström, Samu (2008). Helsinki 1918. Pääkaupunki ja sota [Helsinki 1918. Capital and war] (in Finnish). Helsinki: Minerva. ISBN 978-952-492-138-1.
- Korjus, Olli (2014), Kuusi kuolemaantuomittua (in Finnish), Atena Kustannus Oy, ISBN 978-952-30002-4-7
- Korppi-Tommola, Aura (2016), Miina Sillanpää – edelläkävijä, Helsinki: Suomen kirjallisuuden seura, ISBN 978-952-222-724-9
- Kronlund, Jarl (1986), "Hyvinkää itsenäisyyssodassa", Tiede Ja Ase (in Finnish), 44, Helsinki: Suomen Sotatieteellinen Seura: 154–205, ISSN 0358-8882
- Kuisma, Markku (2010), Sodasta syntynyt. Itsenäisen Suomen synty Sarajevon laukauksista Tarton rauhaan 1914–1920, Helsinki: WSOY, ISBN 978-951-0-36340-9
- Kuusela, Kari (2015), Jüri Vilmsin mysteeri. In: Nieminen, J. (ed.) Helsinki ensimmäisessä maailmansodassa, Helsinki: Gummerus Kustannus Oy, pp. 42–43, ISBN 978-951-24-0086-7
- Lackman, Matti (2000), Suomen vai Saksan puolesta? Jääkäreiden tuntematon historia, Helsinki: Otava, ISBN 951-1-16158-X
- Lackman, Matti (2009), Jääkäriliike. In: Haapala, P. & Hoppu, T. (eds.) Sisällissodan pikkujättiläinen, Helsinki: WSOY, pp. 48–57, ISBN 978-951-0-35452-0
- Lackman, Matti (2014), "Suur-Ruotsi vai itsenäinen Suomi? Puntarointia ja kevään 1918 lopputulos. In: Blomgren, R., Karjalainen, M., Manninen, O., Saloranta, P. & Tuunainen, P. (eds.) Sotahistoriallinen Aikakauskirja 34", Sotahistoriallinen Aikakauskirja = Journal of Military History, Helsinki: Suomen Sotahistoriallinen seura: 216–250, ISSN 0357-816X
- Laitamo, Mikko (1997), "Vuosi 1918 suomalaisessa elokuvassa", Suomi 80 (in Finnish), Historiatieteen laitos, Tampereen yliopisto
- Lappalainen, Jussi T. (1981a), Punakaartin sota I, Helsinki: Valtion painatuskeskus, ISBN 951-859-071-0
- Lappalainen, Jussi T. (1981b), Punakaartin sota II, Helsinki: Valtion painatuskeskus, ISBN 951-859-072-9
- Lappalainen, Mirkka (2012). Jumalan vihan ruoska. Suuri nälänhätä Suomessa 1695-1697. Jelgava: Siltala. ISBN 978-952-234-140-2.
- Lehtinen, Lasse (2021). Murhattu ministeri. Heikki Ritavuoren elämä ja kuolema [Murdered Minister. Life and Death of Heikki Ritavuori]. Keuruu: Otava. ISBN 978-951-1-38632-2.
- Lindqvist, Herman (2003), Ruotsin historia, jääkaudesta tulevaisuuteen, Helsinki: WSOY, ISBN 951-0-28329-0
- Manninen, Ohto (1993a), Sodanjohto ja strategia. In: Manninen, O. (ed.) Itsenäistymisen vuodet 1917–1920, II Taistelu vallasta, Helsinki: Valtion painatuskeskus, pp. 24–93, ISBN 951-37-0728-8
- Manninen, Ohto (1993b), Taistelevat osapuolet. In: Manninen, O. (ed.) Itsenäistymisen vuodet 1917–1920, II Taistelu vallasta, Helsinki: Valtion painatuskeskus, pp. 96–177, ISBN 951-37-0728-8
- Manninen, Ohto (1993c), "Vapaussota", Historiallinen Aikakauskirja (2), archived from the original on 6 November 2002
- Manninen, Ohto (1995), Vapaussota – osana suursotaa ja Venäjän imperiumin hajoamista. In: Aunesluoma, J. & Häikiö, M. (eds.) Suomen vapaussota 1918. Kartasto ja tutkimusopas, Porvoo: WSOY, pp. 21–32, ISBN 951-0-20174-X
- Manninen*, Turo (1993a), Työväenkaartien kehitys maaliskuusta marraskuuhun 1917. In: Manninen, O. (ed.) Itsenäistymisen vuodet 1917–1920, I Irti Venäjästä, Helsinki: Valtion painatuskeskus, pp. 324–343, ISBN 951-37-0727-X
- Manninen*, Turo (1993b), Kaartit vastakkain. In: Manninen, O. (ed.) Itsenäistymisen vuodet 1917–1920, I Irti Venäjästä, Helsinki: Valtion painatuskeskus, pp. 346–395, ISBN 951-37-0727-X
- Manninen*, Turo (1993c), Tie sotaan. In: Manninen, O. (ed.) Itsenäistymisen vuodet 1917–1920, I Irti Venäjästä, Helsinki: Valtion painatuskeskus, pp. 398–432, ISBN 951-37-0727-X
- Meinander, Henrik (2010), Suomen historia. Linjat, rakenteet, käännekohdat, Helsinki: WSOY, ISBN 978-951-0-37863-2
- Meinander, Henrik (2012), Tasavallan tiellä, Suomi kansalaissodasta 2010-luvulle, Helsinki: Schildts & Söderströms, ISBN 978-951-52-2957-1
- Muilu, Heikki (2010), Venäjän sotilaat valkoisessa Suomessa, Jyväskylä: Atena, ISBN 978-951-796-624-5
- Nygård, Toivo (2003), Uhkan väliaikainen väistyminen. In: Zetterberg, S. (ed.) Suomen historian pikkujättiläinen, Porvoo: WSOY, pp. 553–65, ISBN 951-0-27365-1
- Olkkonen, Tuomo (2003), Modernisoituva suuriruhtinaskunta. In: Zetterberg, S. (ed.) Suomen historian pikkujättiläinen, Porvoo: WSOY, pp. 465–533, ISBN 951-0-27365-1
- Paavolainen, Jaakko (1966). Poliittiset väkivaltaisuudet Suomessa 1918, I Punainen terrori [Political violence in Finland 1918, I Red terror] (in Finnish). Helsinki: Tammi.
- Paavolainen, Jaakko (1967). Poliittiset väkivaltaisuudet Suomessa 1918, II Valkoinen terrori [Political violence in Finland 1918, II White terror] (in Finnish). Helsinki: Tammi.
- Paavolainen, Jaakko (1971). Vankileirit Suomessa 1918 [Prison camps in Finland in 1918] (in Finnish). Helsinki: Tammi. ISBN 951-30-1015-5.
- Pekkalainen, Tuulikki (2014), Lapset sodasssa 1918, Helsinki: Tammi, ISBN 978-951-31-6939-8
- Peltonen, Ulla-Maija (2003), Muistin paikat. Vuoden 1918 sisällissodan muistamisesta ja unohtamisesta, Helsinki: Suomen Kirjallisuuden seura, ISBN 978-951-74-6468-0
- Pesonen, Mikko (4 October 2021), "Ruotsalaisen sivistyksen puolesta barbariaa vastaan – ruotsalainen prikaati lähti Suomen sisällissotaan sankariteot mielessä, mutta ne hautautuivat Kalevankankaan veriseen lumeen", YLE (in Finnish)
- Pietiäinen, Jukka-Pekka (1992), Suomen ulkopolitiikan alku. In: Manninen, O. (ed.) Itsenäistymisen vuodet 1917–1920, III Katse tulevaisuuteen, Helsinki: Valtion painatuskeskus, pp. 252–403, ISBN 951-37-0729-6
- Piilonen, Juhani (1992), Kansallisen eheytyksen ensi askeleet. In: Manninen, O. (ed.) Itsenäistymisen vuodet 1917–1920, III Katse tulevaisuuteen, Helsinki: Valtion painatuskeskus, pp. 228–249, ISBN 951-37-0729-6
- Piilonen, Juhani (1993), Rintamien selustassa. In: Manninen, O. (ed.) Itsenäistymisen vuodet 1917–1920, II Taistelu vallasta, Helsinki: Valtion painatuskeskus, pp. 486–627, ISBN 951-37-0728-8
- Pilke, Helena (2025). Sanomalehtien sisällissota. Tallinna: Vastapaino. ISBN 978-952-397-268-1.
- Rautkallio, Hannu (1977), Kaupantekoa Suomen itsenäisyydellä. Saksan sodan päämäärät Suomessa 1917–1918, Helsinki: WSOY, ISBN 978-951-0-08492-2
- Rinta-Tassi, Osmo (1986), Kansanvaltuuskunta Punaisen Suomen hallituksena, Helsinki: Valtion painatuskeskus, ISBN 951-860-079-1
- Rinta-Tassi, Osmo (1989), Lokakuun vallankumous ja Suomen itsenäistyminen. In: Numminen J. et al. (eds.) Lenin ja Suomi II, Helsinki: Valtion painatuskeskus, pp. 83–161, ISBN 951-860-402-9
- Roselius, Aapo (2004). "Saksalaisten henkilötappiot Suomessa vuonna 1918" [German casualties in Finland in 1918]. In Westerlund, L. (ed.). Sotaoloissa vuosina 1914–1922 surmansa saaneet [Deaths in war conditions between 1914 and 1922] (in Finnish). Helsinki: VNKJ 10/2004, Edita. pp. 165–176. ISBN 952-5354-52-0.
- Roselius, Aapo (2006), Amatöörien sota. Rintamataisteluiden henkilötappiot Suomen sisällissodassa 1918, Helsinki: VNKJ 1/2006, Edita, ISBN 952-5354-92-X
- Saarikoski, Vesa (2008), Yhteiskunnan modernisoituminen. In: Pernaa, V. & Niemi, K. Mari (eds.) Suomalaisen yhteiskunnan poliittinen historia, Helsinki: Edita, pp. 113–131, ISBN 978-951-37-5321-4
- Siltala, Juha (2009). Sisällissodan psykohistoria. Keuruu: Otava. ISBN 978-951-1-23795-2.
- Soikkanen, Timo (2008), Taistelu autonomiasta. In: Pernaa, V. & Niemi, K. Mari (eds.) Suomalaisen yhteiskunnan poliittinen historia, Helsinki: Edita, pp. 45–94, ISBN 978-951-37-5321-4
- Suodenjoki, Sami (2009a), Siviilihallinto. In: Haapala, P. & Hoppu, T. (eds.) Sisällissodan pikkujättiläinen, Helsinki: WSOY, pp. 246–269, ISBN 978-951-0-35452-0
- Suodenjoki, Sami (2009b), Vankileirit. In: Haapala, P. & Hoppu, T. (eds.) Sisällissodan pikkujättiläinen, Helsinki: WSOY, pp. 335–355, ISBN 978-951-0-35452-0
- Tikka, Marko (2004). "Teloitetut, ammutut ja murhatut" [Executed, shot and murdered]. In Westerlund, L. (ed.). Sotaoloissa vuosina 1914–1922 surmansa saaneet [Deaths in war conditions between 1914 and 1922] (in Finnish). Helsinki: VNKJ 10/2004, Edita. pp. 93–106. ISBN 952-5354-52-0.
- Tikka, Marko (2006), Terrorin aika. Suomen levottomat vuodet 1917–1921, Jyväskylä: Gummerus, ISBN 951-20-7051-0
- Tikka, Marko (2009), Kun kansa leikki kuningasta. Suomen suuri lakko 1905, Helsinki: Suomen kirjallisuuden seura, ISBN 978-952-222-141-4
- Tukkinen, Tauno (2008). Naiskapinallisten henkilötappiot 1918. Helsinki: Yliopistopaino. ISBN 978-952-99889-3-8.
- Uola, Mikko (1998), Seinää vasten vain; poliittisen väkivallan motiivit Suomessa 1917–1918, Helsinki: Otava, ISBN 978-951-11-5440-2
- Upton, Anthony F. (1980). Vallankumous Suomessa 1917–1918 [Revolution in Finland 1917–1918] (in Finnish). Vol. I. Jyväskylä: Gummerus. ISBN 951-26-2022-7.
- Upton, Anthony F. (1981). Vallankumous Suomessa 1917–1918 [Revolution in Finland 1917–1918] (in Finnish). Vol. II. Jyväskylä: Gummerus. ISBN 951-26-2022-7.
- Vares, Vesa (1998). Kuninkaantekijät. Suomalainen monarkia 1917–1919, myytti ja todellisuus [Kingmakers. The Finnish monarchy 1917–1919, myth and reality] (in Finnish). Juva: WSOY. ISBN 951-0-23228-9.
- Vares, Vesa (2009). "Kuningashankkeesta tasavallan syntyyn" [From the king's project to the birth of the republic]. In Haapala, P.; Hoppu, T. [in Finnish] (eds.). Sisällissodan pikkujättiläinen [The Little Giant of the Civil War] (in Finnish). Helsinki: WSOY. pp. 376–394. ISBN 978-951-0-35452-0.
- Varpio, Yrjö (2009). "Vuosi 1918 kaunokirjallisuudessa" [The year 1918 in fiction]. In Haapala, P.; Hoppu, T. [in Finnish] (eds.). Sisällissodan pikkujättiläinen [The Little Giant of the Civil War] (in Finnish). Helsinki: WSOY. pp. 441–463. ISBN 978-951-0-35452-0.
- von Bagh, Peter (2007). Sininen laulu. Itsenäisen Suomen taiteen tarina [Blue song. The story of independent Finnish art] (in Finnish). Helsinki: WSOY. ISBN 978-951-0-32895-8.
- Voutilainen, Miikka (2017). Nälän vuodet. Nälänhädän historia [The years of hunger. A history of famine] (in Finnish). Jyväskylä: Atena. ISBN 978-952-30035-14.
- Westerlund, Lars (2004a). Sotaoloissa vuosina 1914–1922 surmansa saaneet [Those who were killed in wartime between 1914 and 1922] (in Finnish). Helsinki: VNKJ 10/2004, Edita. ISBN 952-5354-52-0.
- Westerlund, Lars (2004b). Venäläissurmat Suomessa 1914–1922, 2.1. Sotatapahtumat 1918–1922 [Russian deaths in Finland 1914–1922, 2.1. War events 1918–1922] (in Finnish). Helsinki: VNKJ 2/2004, Edita. ISBN 952-5354-44-X.
- Westerlund, Lars; Kalleinen, Kristiina (2004). "Loppuarvio surmansa saaneista venäläisistä" [Final assessment of the Russians who were killed]. In Westerlund, L. (ed.). Venäläissurmat Suomessa 1914–1922, 2.2. Sotatapahtumat 1918–1922 [Russian deaths in Finland 1914–1922, 2.2. War events 1918–1922] (in Finnish). Helsinki: VNKJ 3/2004c, Edita. pp. 267–271. ISBN 952-5354-45-8.
- Ylikangas, Heikki (1986), Käännekohdat Suomen historiassa, Juva: WSOY, ISBN 951-0-13745-6
- Ylikangas, Heikki (1993a), Tie Tampereelle, Porvoo: WSOY, ISBN 951-0-18897-2
- Ylikangas, Heikki (1993b), "Sisällissota", Historiallinen Aikakauskirja (2), archived from the original on 12 January 2003
