= Hannes Sula =

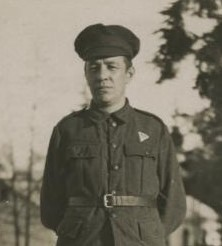
- Sula wearing a British uniform in 1920
- Born: 29 June 1894; Tampere, Grand Duchy of Finland, Russian Empire
- Died: 21 November 1955 (aged 61); Sudbury, Canada
- Political party: Communist Party of Canada; Social Democratic Party of Finland
- Other political affiliations: Labor-Progressive Party of Canada
- Military service
- Allegiance: Finnish Socialist Workers' Republic
- Branch: Red Guards
- Conflicts: Russian Civil War; Finnish Civil War; Battle of Tampere

Hannes Einari Sula (29 June 1894 – 21 November 1955) was a Finnish and Canadian newspaperman, trade unionist and revolutionary who fought in the Finnish Civil War. During the Allied North Russia Intervention he was one of the leading Finns of the British organized Murmansk Legion. In 1920, Sula was exiled to Canada where he worked as a newspaperman and trade unionist.

== Life ==
Sula was born to a carpenter's family in Tampere and raised in Helsinki. He worked as an office clerk and was active in the Social Democratic Party since the early 1910s. Sula was also a talented athlete. In 1916, he won the Finnish Championship in 100 meter run.

During the 1918 Civil War, Sula served in the Red administration. In late March, he joined the Helsinki Red Guard and fought in the Battle of Tampere. After the Battle of Helsinki, Sula was a member of a delegation sent to the Murman Railway to organize Red troops in the north. In June 1918, Sula joined the Murmansk Legion serving as a company leader in Knyazhaya Guba. With Aarne Orjatsalo and August Wesley he formed an opposition against the pro-Bolshevik Verner Lehtimäki, the Finnish commander of the Murmansk Legion. As the Murmansk Legion was disbanded, Sula was one of the legionnaries the Finnish Government banned of returning Finland despite the amnesty. Finally in November 1920, the group of 40 men received an asylum in Canada.

Sula settled Sudbury, Ontario where he became a trade union organizer in the mining and lumber communities. Sula joined the Communist Party of Canada and was active in the Communist dominated Finnish Organization of Canada. He was also a newspaperman in the Finnish-Canadian Metsätyöläinen, published by the Lumber Workers Industrial Union of Canada, and Vapaus. During the Great Depression Sula was the secretary of the National Unemployed Workers' Association. As the Communist Party of Canada was banned in 1940, Sula joined the Labor-Progressive Party. For his last 10 years Sula was the editor of Vapaus. He died in November 1955 following a cerebral infarction. Sula is buried to the Park Lawn Cemetery in Greater Sudbury.
