= Iivo Ahava =

Finnish military officer and nationalist

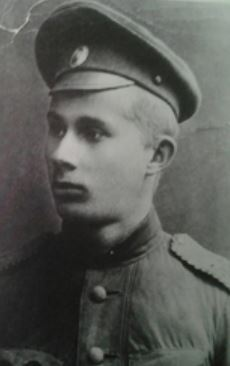
- Iivo Ahava as a Royal Navy lieutenant in 1918
- Born: February 19, 1896; Uhtua, Russian Empire
- Died: April 16, 1919 (aged 23); Segezhsky District, Soviet Russia
- Military career
- Allegiance: (Russia) Russian Empire; Red Finland; United Kingdom
- Service years: 1916–1919
- Rank: Sergeant (Russian Imperial Army); Lieutenant (Royal Navy)
- Conflicts: World War I; Finnish Civil War; North Russia Intervention

Iivo Ahava (born Afanasev; 19 February 1896 – 16 April 1919) was a Karelian-born Finnish military officer and nationalist who supported the idea of an independent East Karelia. In the 1918 Finnish Civil War, Ahava led a Red Guard unit fighting against the Whites on their Viena expedition. During the Allied North Russia Intervention, Ahava served as a lieutenant in the British organized units of Murmansk Legion and Karelian Regiment. He was murdered in unclear circumstances in East Karelia.

== Life ==
=== Early years ===
Ahava was born in the Russian Empire as the son of the wealthy merchant and Karelian nationalist Paavo Afanasev. The family soon moved to the Grand Duchy of Finland to Kuusamo where Ahava spent most of his childhood. He later studied business management in the northern town of Oulu and the capital Helsinki, but never graduated. In 1916, Ahava joined the Russian Imperial Army and fought in the Eastern Front in Galicia. He was promoted to sergeant and awarded with the Cross of St. George. After the 1917 February Revolution, Ahava returned to Finland and served with the Russian troops in Oulu.

=== Finnish Civil War ===
Following the start of the Finnish Civil War in January 1918, the Whites took control of the northern part of the country. Ahava fled to Soviet Russia and formed a Red Guard unit in Kandalaksha. The 1,000-man unit was composed of Finnish lumberjacks working in East Karelia and of the Reds who had fled from the Finnish Lapland. From 23 March to 18 April, Ahava fought against the Finnish Whites who had launched their Viena expedition to annex parts of East Karelia into the newly independent Finland. Ahava opposed their plans and supported an independent East Karelia.

Ahava's position as a Red Guard leader was complex as his family members had joined the Whites. His father Paavo traveled around as a commissioner, brother Paavo junior served in one of the Viena expedition's reconnaissance units and the sister Veera was a nurse in the staff of colonel K. M. Wallenius.

The Reds were able to stop the Whites, and Ahava was also eager to attack their rear in the northern Finland. However, the Red Guard general staff in Helsinki was not interested in his intentions as they considered that the war would be determined in the populated areas of southern Finland, instead of the remote Lapland. In late spring, one thousand Finnish workers of the Murmansk railway joined Ahava's troops.

=== North Russia Intervention ===
As the Allies launched the North Russia Intervention in June 1918, Ahava's Red Guard was left between the British troops and the Russian White Army. Ahava and his companion Aleksi Tuorila negotiated with the Allies, the issue was resolved after the British formed the Murmansk Legion of the Finnish Reds. According to the agreement, Murmansk Legion was used only against the possible German offensive against the Murmansk railway, but not against the Russian Bolsheviks. German troops had landed in Finland in April and were allies of the Finnish Whites. This agreement was also accepted by the Bolshevik leader V. I. Lenin.

Ahava served the Murmansk Legion as a lieutenant-ranked Royal Navy officer, but he soon realized that his service was incompatible with his personal interests on the matter of East Karelia. In January 1919, Ahava moved to Kem and joined the staff of the Karelian Regiment. It was another British organized unit, but instead of Reds, it was mainly composed of Karelian supporters of the Russian White Movement. Although Ahava switched sides, he still kept close relations with the Finnish Reds.

In the winter of 1919, Ahava became affiliated with the Karelian nationalist movement which was a counterforce to the Finnish nationalists who wanted to annex East Karelia into Finland. In 17–18 February, Ahava participated the meeting of Karelian National Congress in Kem, with Oskari Tokoi as his political advisor. Ahava was elected as the secretary of the meeting. He read the statement proposing the declaration of an independent state of East Karelia. However, the Allies and Russian Whites opposed this idea strictly and suspected Ahava of mutiny in the Karelian Regiment. He was arrested in the beginning of March, but was soon released.

=== Death ===
A month later, August Wesley revealed an upcoming rebellion in the Murmansk Legion. The plan was made by Ahava, the Finnish commander of the Murmansk Legion Verner Lehtimäki, and the Finnish revolutionary K. O. Iivonen. Ahava was arrested again on 6 April, but instead of court martial, he was forced to move to the Bolshevik side.

On 16 April, the British lieutenant Robinson took Ahava by train to the village of Popov Porog and escorted him in front of the Allied outpost. On 24 April, the Red Army found Ahava's body from the no man's land. According to the Petrograd-based Finnish newspaper Wapaus, his body was severely beaten and there was signs that Ahava had resisted his killers. The Allies never made any inspection, but the Serbian troops had been regarded as responsible for his death. Although, the Finnish author O. V. Itkonen later claimed hearing in Murmansk that Ahava was killed by Russian Whites.
