= Aarne Orjatsalo =

Finnish actor, theater manager and revolutionary

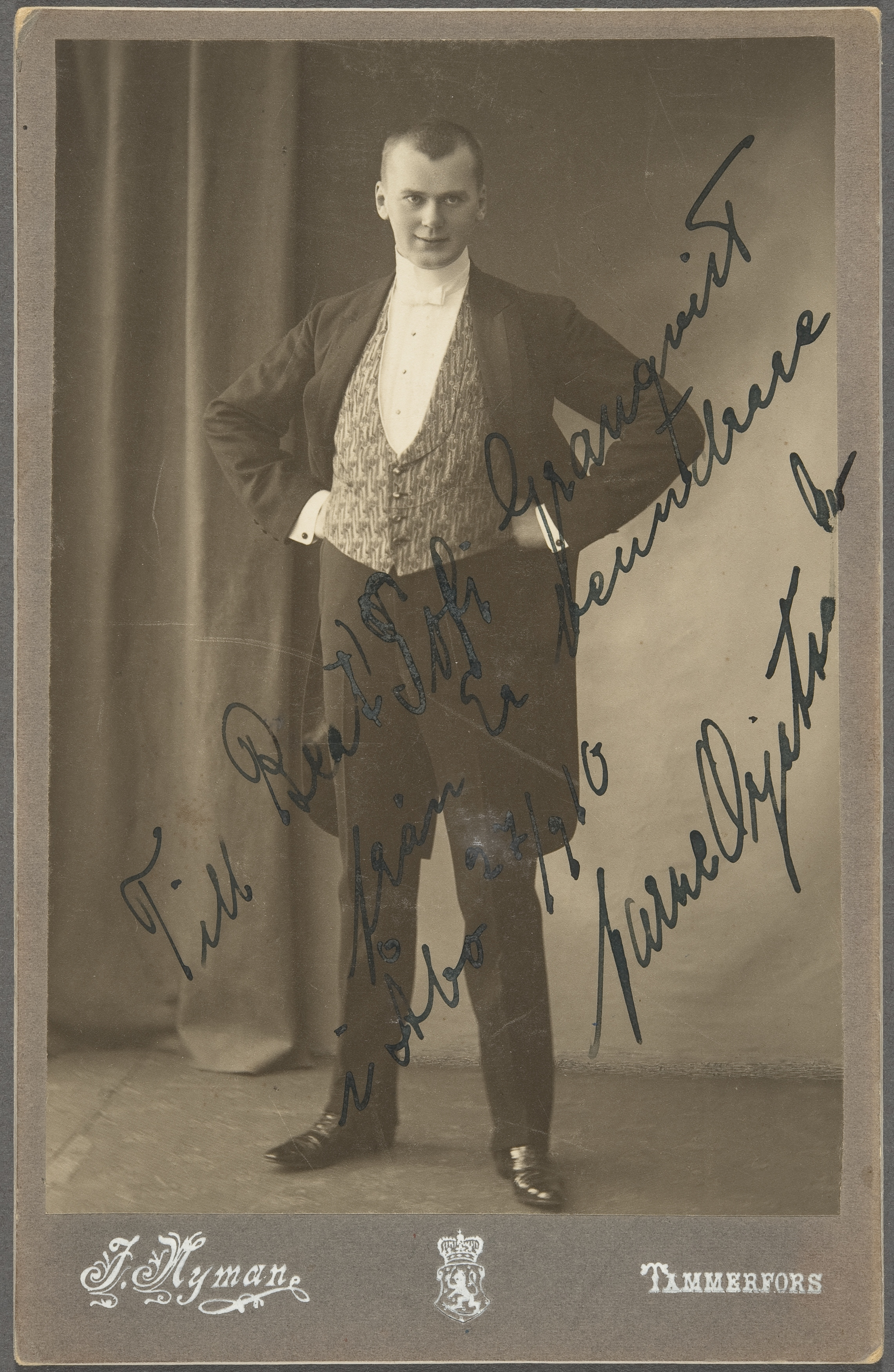
- Aarne Orjatsalo in the 1910s
- Born: Aarne Alarik Riddelin; October 13, 1883; Simo, Grand Duchy of Finland
- Died: January 1, 1941 (aged 57); New York City, United States
- Other names: Alaric Arnee, Alexei Volkoff
- Occupations: Actor, writer, revolutionary

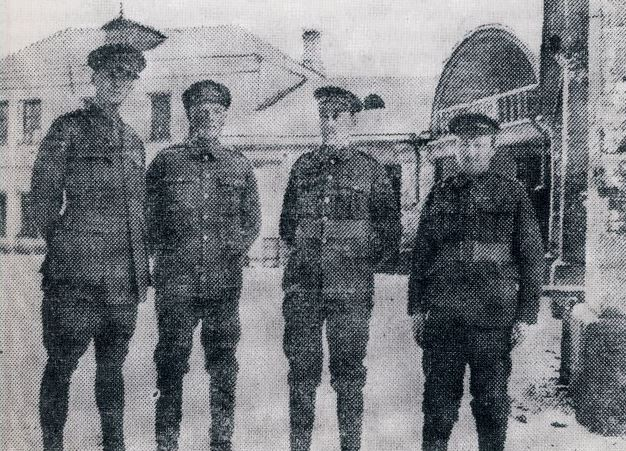
Murmansk Legion officers, from left to right; Aarne Orjatsalo, Hjalmar Lehtimäki, Richard Burton and Oskari Tokoi

Aarne Alarik Orjatsalo (13 October 1883 – 1 January 1941) was a Finnish actor, theater manager, writer, revolutionary and soldier. He fought for the Finnish Red Guards in the 1918 Civil War and in the 1918–1919 Allied North Russia Intervention ranked as a British Navy officer. Orjatsalo later fled to the United States, where he was known by the alias Alaric Arnee.

== Early years ==
Orjatsalo was born in the municipality of Simo in Lapland, Finland. At the age of 17 he joined a touring theater group and later in 1901 started acting in the Finnish Theatre in Helsinki. Since 1904 Orjatsalo worked in several theaters in Finland, including Tampere Theatre in 1904–1910 and Finnish National Theatre 1913–1914. He was known as a charismatic actor with a strong effective voice. Orjatsalo was famous of his leading roles in such plays as Othello, Hamlet, and Kullervo.

Since the early 1900s, Orjatsalo was interested in socialism. In 1903 he participated the famous Forssa Congress of the Social Democratic Party of Finland. He was also a writer in several Finnish socialist newspapers, published the novel Viettelijä (The Seductor) in 1907 and worked as a translator.

== Finnish Civil War and the Murmansk Legion ==
As the 1918 Finnish Civil War broke out, Orjatsalo was working as the manager of the Tampere Workers' Theatre. He joined the Red Guards and served as a platoon leader in the city of Tampere. Before the Battle of Tampere in April 1918, Orjatsalo managed to flee to Helsinki and later to Soviet Russia where he met the Finnish communist leader Otto Wille Kuusinen in Moscow. On his advice, Orjatsalo joined the Murmansk Legion which was a British Royal Navy organized military unit during the 1918–1919 Allied North Russia Intervention. It was composed of former Finnish Red Guard members who had fled to Russia. Murmansk legion was fighting against the Finnish White Guards and the German troops in White Karelia. The unit was disbanded in 1919 as the British troops withdraw. Orjatsalo and some 20 other high-ranked Murmansk Legion officers were forced to leave to England or North America, as they were condemned by both the Finnish Government and the Russian Bolsheviks. Orjatsalo had received a death penalty by the Finnish authorities.

== After the war ==
In 1921–1922 Orjatsalo worked at the Winter Garden Theater in London and emigrated to the United States in 1923. He worked as a director at the Workers' Stage of New York and visited several other American theaters in 1924–1925. Because of the mass amnesties of the former Red Guard fighters, Orjatsalo was able to return Finland in 1929, but after the rise of radical right-wing Lapua Movement he had to flee the country again in 1932. Orjatsalo worked in the United States as a chef, cab driver and butler. He died in New York in January 1941 using the alias Alexei Volkoff.

== Family ==
Aarne Orjatsalo was married four times, but his only child, the writer Jarno Pennanen (1906–1969), was from Orjatsalo's early relationship. His grandson is the Finnish playwright Jotaarkka Pennanen (born 1946). Orjatsalo's last spouse was the British actress Alice Phillips.
