= Battle of Vilppula =

1918 battle of the Finnish Civil War

Coordinates: 62.012382°N 24.485806°E

- Part of the Finnish Civil War
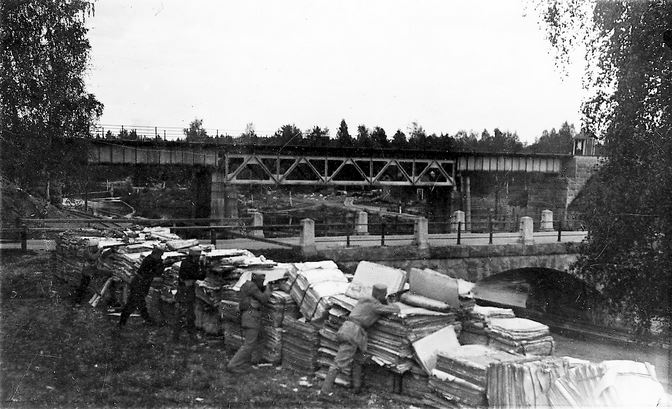
- Whites by the Vilppula bridges, the image is staged and taken after the war.
Date	31 January – 18 March 1918 (1 month, 2 weeks and 4 days)
Location	Vilppula and Ruovesi, Finland
Result	White victory: Red retreat

Belligerents
Finnish Whites	Finnish Reds

Commanders and leaders
Martin Wetzer; Carl Nordensvan; Martin Ekström	Erkki Karjalainen; Verner Lehtimäki; Mikko Kokko

Strength
900–1,050	1,500–2,300

Casualties and losses
60	125

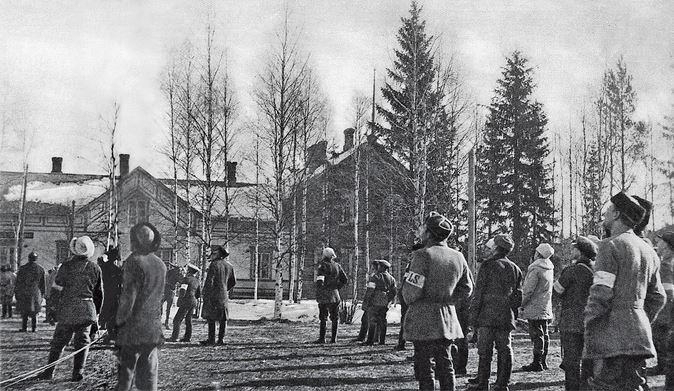
Whites observing an enemy aircraft at the Vilppula train station

Battle of Vilppula was a Finnish Civil War battle fought in Vilppula and Ruovesi, Finland from 31 January to 18 March 1918 between the Whites and the Reds. Due to its location by the Tampere–Haapamäki railway, Vilppula was a gateway to the White-controlled Central Finland. The Reds were aiming to reach Haapamäki, 25 kilometres north of Vilppula, which was a vital junction of the east–west railways connecting the regions of Ostrobothnia, Häme and Karelia. From Haapamäki, the Reds would be able to reach the White stronghold in Southern Ostrobothnia, including their capital Vaasa. However, the attack along the railway was stopped in the beginning of February. The Reds now turned their attention to the village of Väärinmaja in order to reach Vilppula from southwest by the road connecting Ruovesi and Vilppula. This offensive also failed, and finally on 15 March, the Whites launched their own offensive and the Reds retreated south to defend the city of Tampere.

== Battle in Vilppula ==
=== The first clashes ===
The first clash in Vilppula occurred on 31 January, as 200 Reds attacked the industrial community of Mänttä which was held by the local White Guard. The conflict was solved with the help of the village priest, and both sides were disarmed. On the next day, the White Guard from nearby Keuruu entered the scene, and the Reds were forced to retreat to the railway station of Lyly, about 15 kilometers south of Vilppula. Later the same day, a White unit led by the prominent warlord Matti Laurila, later killed in the Battle of Länkipohja, advanced towards Lyly, but was stopped by a demolished railway bridge. By chance, a train carrying the staff of the Romanian embassy evacuated from Saint Petersburg arrived to the other side of the bridge and the Whites were able to continue by commandeering their train. Finally, the Whites had to turn back before reaching Lyly, as the Reds had broken the railway track in several places. The Whites now settled to the Vilppula railway station, while the Reds gathered their troops in Lyly.

The Russians got involved with the events as the Whites had captured more than 2,000 Russian soldiers who had surrendered their weapons. Mikhail Svechnikov, the commander of the Russian 106th division in Tampere, was forced to take action against the Whites as the captured were under his command. Svechnikov sent a group of 500 volunteers to fight with the Reds. This unit was led by the second lieutenant G. A. Stolbov, but the Russians were soon sent to the Battle of Kuru, which was fought 40 kilometres west of Vilppula.

=== Red offensive ===
The Reds launched their first offensive against Vilppula on 2 February with the support of Russian troops and an armoured train. The Whites had built a defensive line behind the two bridges crossing the river Vilppulankoski. During the next five days, the Reds attacked several times, but all efforts failed. As they got reinforcements from the Helsinki Red Guard and the Saint Petersburg Finnish Red Guard, three more attacks were made in the next two weeks, but the Reds could not break through.

On 21 February, the Red general offensive was launched, but the Vilppula Reds did not join the attack as the White artillery had stopped their armoured train. Fighting settled down, both sides now focused in firing each other with artillery. On 13 March, the Reds performed a peculiar operation as they loaded a train full of explosives and sent it towards the Vilppula station. The ghost train ran over the roadblocks and finally stopped at the rail yard, where the Whites managed to make the overpressured locomotive harmless and prevent the explosion.

=== Evacuation of the British embassy ===
In the beginning of March 1918, a train carrying the personnel of the British embassy in Saint Petersburg arrived in Tampere. The British had left Russia in the aftermath of the October Revolution and were now heading back home through Finland and Sweden. The Finnish-American Reds, August Wesley and Verner Lehtimäki, negotiated with the British and the Reds agreed to let them cross the front line in Vilppula. When the British convoy reached the White lines, they were greeted with gunfire as the Whites did not notice the white flag against the snowy background and assumed the Union Jack was some kind of socialist banner. Eventually, crossing the front line succeeded and the British returned safely home.

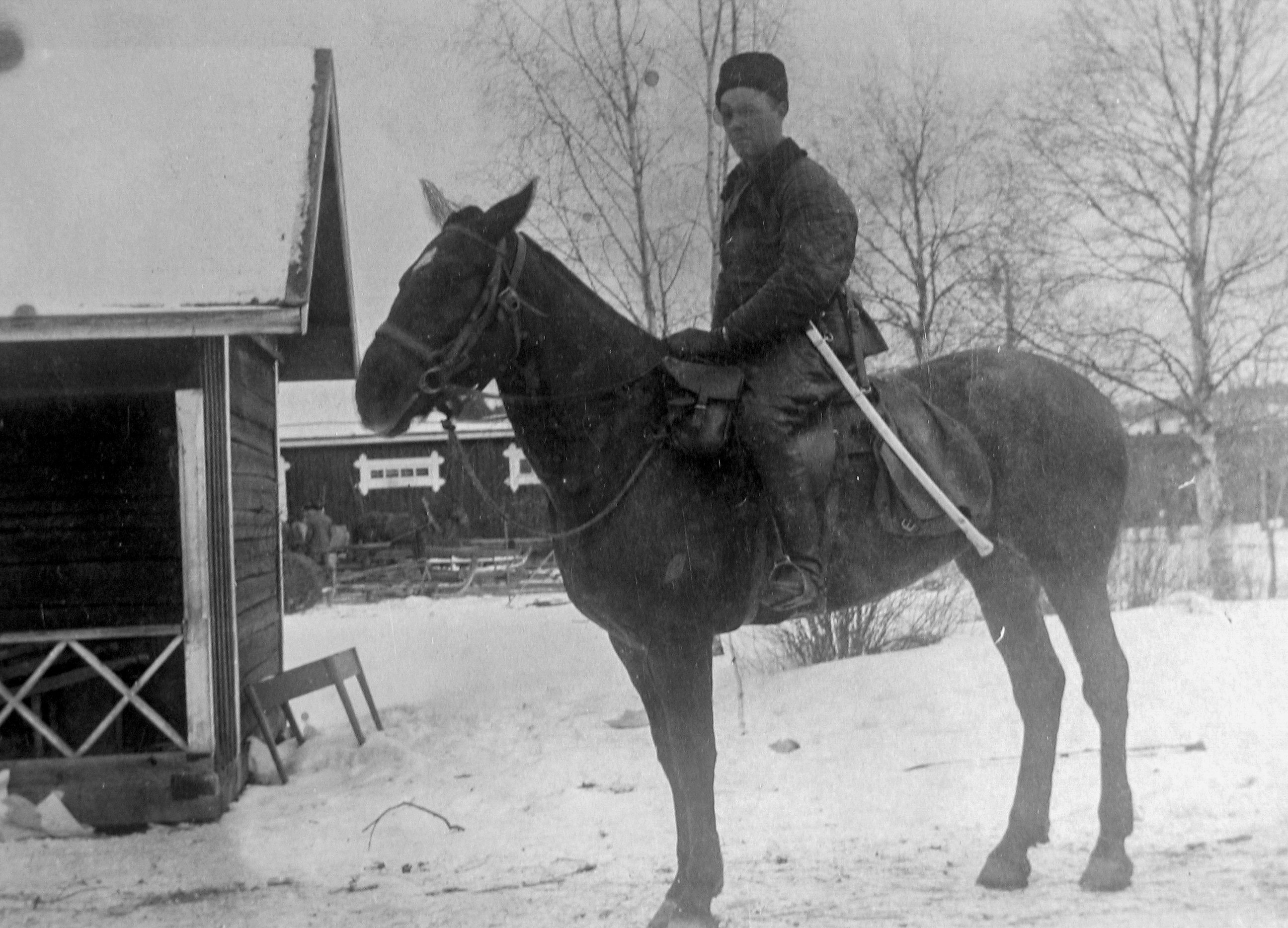
The Red cavalry commander Verner Lehtimäki at the Lyly train station

== Battle in Väärinmaja ==
As the Reds were not able to reach Vilppula by the northbound railway, they decided to attack from southwest along the road connecting Ruovesi and Vilppula. The Reds now had to break through the White lines in the village of Väärinmaja, located 13 kilometres southwest of Vilppula. The Reds gathered their troops of 1,000 men to the village of Hyyrylä, about 4 kilometres south of Väärinmaja. The troops commanded by Mikko Kokko included elite units like the Helsinki Red Guard A-company and the Porttu Battalion, which was composed of the workers of the Katajanokka naval shipyard in Helsinki. The Reds also had a 100 men cavalry unit from Turku, under the command of the revolutionary brothers Verner and Jalmar Lehtimäki. The Whites in turn had 600 men in Väärinmaja, commanded by the lieutenant Carl Nordensvan and the volunteer Swedish captain Martin Ekström.

The Reds launched their first attack on 21 February by pounding Väärinmaja and the nearby villages of Seppälä and Enoranta with artillery fire. They took Enoranta, but three days later, the Whites launched a counterattack and took the village back. The second attack was made on 10 March, but this one also failed. The final attempt on 13 March was again preceded by heavy artillery fire, but Väärinmaja remained in White control. Two days later, the Whites launched a major offensive against Tampere and the Red front collapsed in just a couple of days. The Reds left Vilppula area on 18 March and joined the Battle of Tampere.

The total casualties in Väärinmaja were 23 killed Whites and at least 50 killed Reds.
