= August Wesley =

Finnish journalist

- August Anselm Wesslin
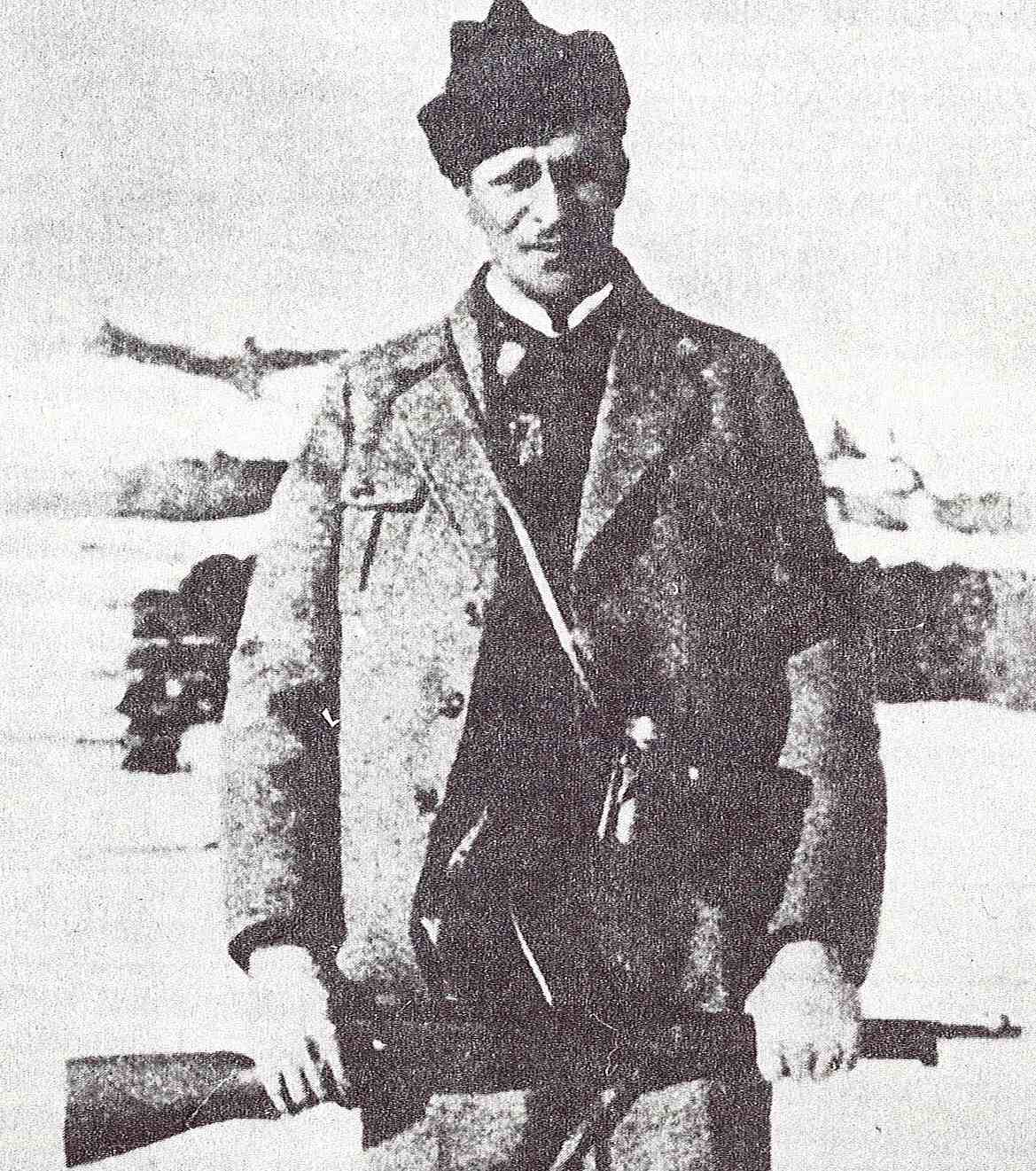
- August Wesley in the Finnish Civil War
- Born: 3 August 1887; Tampere, Grand Duchy of Finland
- Died: unknown Leningrad, Soviet Union
- Military career
- Allegiance: Red Finland; Great Britain; Estonia
- Service years: 1917–1920
- Rank: Lieutenant
- Conflicts: Finnish Civil War; Russian Civil War; North Russia Intervention; Estonian War of Independence

August Anselm Wesley (né Wesslin; born 3 August 1887; last rumoured to be alive 1942) was a Finnish journalist, trade unionist, and revolutionary who was the chief of the Red Guards general staff in the Finnish Civil War. He later served as a lieutenant in the British organized Murmansk Legion and the Estonian Army.

== Life ==
=== Early years and the Finnish Civil War ===
August Anselm Wesslin was born in the industrial town of Tampere and emigrated to the United States in 1904 at the age of 17. He was an active member of the Socialist Party of America, working as a speaker among Finnish-American workers. Wesley studied at the Work People's College in Duluth, Minnesota, where he also worked as a teacher in the mid-1910s. He was a journalist in the Finnish daily Industrialisti, which was linked to the Industrial Workers of the World. Wesley held United States citizenship, but when the country joined World War I in 1917, Wesley returned to Finland via Japan and Russia to avoid the draft.

Wesley moved to Joensuu, in the remote province of North Karelia, the hometown of his spouse, Fanny Käyhkö. Wesley worked as a district party secretary of the Social Democratic Party. During the Finnish general strike of 1917, he was the head of the local strike committee and was soon elected commander of the Joensuu Red Guard. As the civil war started in late January 1918, the White Guards took control in Joensuu. Many of the Reds were captured, but Wesley managed to leave the town. He sneaked across the front line to the Red controlled southern Finland and headed to the capital city of Helsinki. He became the commander of the Helsinki Red Guard, and on 16 February, Wesley was named the chief of the Red Guards general staff, the second-highest position in the organization's hierarchy.

=== In the Murmansk Legion ===
After the loss at the Battle of Tampere on 6 April 1918, Kullervo Manner was given dictatorial powers and Wesley was dismissed. Before the socialist faction fell in late April, Wesley fled to Soviet Russia. He moved to East Karelia and joined the Murmansk Legion, which was a British-organized unit comprising Finnish Red Guard fighters who had fled to Russia. During the Allied North Russia Intervention, Wesley served as an interpreter and an intelligence officer and ranked as a British Navy lieutenant.

Following the German surrender, the status of the Murmansk Legion changed as the Allies and Soviet Russia became enemies. The Finnish commander of the Murmansk Legion, Verner Lehtimäki, stayed loyal to the Bolshevik government, but Wesley, Oskari Tokoi, and Karl Emil Primus-Nyman openly supported the Allies. They urged the Finnish working-class to reject communism and join them in pursuit of a democratic socialist Finland. The exiled Communist Party of Finland declared the three traitors and outlaws.

Afterwards, Wesley exposed Lehtimäki's mutiny plan and his intentions of attacking Finland. As a result, Lehtimäki and others, such as Iivo Ahava, were dismissed from the Legion and joined the Bolshevik side.

=== Life in Estonia ===
The Murmansk Legion was disbanded in late 1919. Great Britain and the United States had set a precondition for the recognition of Finland's independence; the government of Finland had to allow the legionnaires to return home safely and they could not be punished for their actions. This agreement, however, excluded the Red Guard leaders such as Wesley. He was given permission to move to Britain, but Wesley chose to stay in Estonia. He joined the Estonian Army, where he served as a lieutenant in the War of Independence. After the war, Wesley settled in Tallinn where he first worked for the ministry of social affairs and later as a journalist in the newspaper Vaba Maa, the organ of the Estonian Labour Party.

Wesley also translated literature to Estonian and Finnish. One of his translations is the 1937 Estonian version of Laozi's famous work, Tao Te Ching.

During the 1920s and 1930s, Wesley contacted the Finnish government several times asking to return to Finland, but with no success; the government maintained the exclusion of return for Red Guard leaders. When the Soviet Union occupied Estonia in June 1940, Wesley went underground. He was last seen in Narva in 1941. According to some newspaper sources, Wesley starved to death in the Siege of Leningrad in 1942.
