= Murmansk Legion =

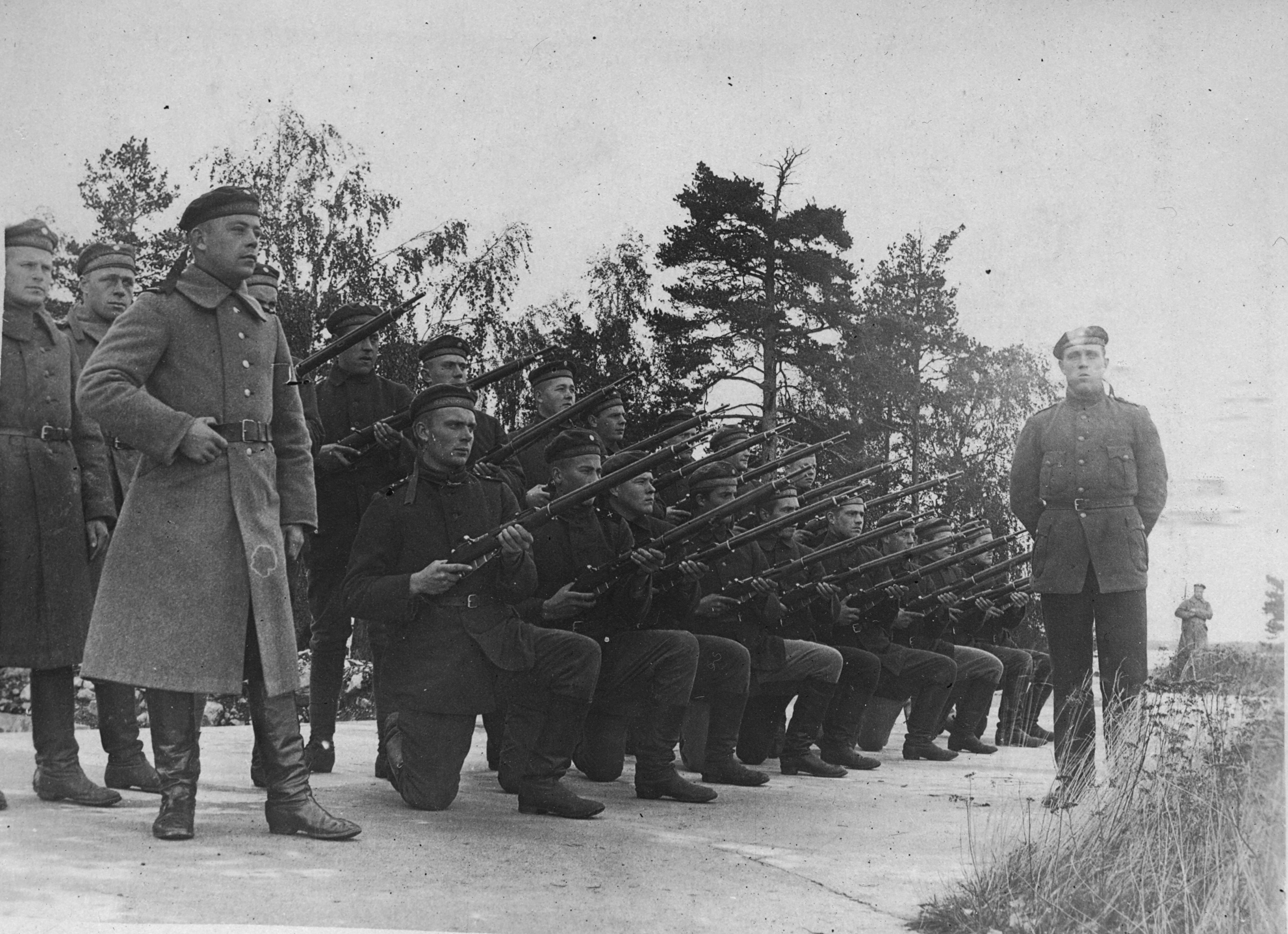
Murmansk legionnaires in 1918

The Murmansk Legion, also known as the Finnish Legion, was a British Royal Navy organized military unit during the 1918–1919 Allied North Russia Intervention. It was composed of Finnish Red Guards who had fled after the Finnish Civil War from the White-dominated Northern Finland to Soviet Russia and of some Finns working on the Murmansk Railroad. The Legion, along with British troops, fought off the 1918 Viena expedition of Finnish White Guards and defended the Murmansk Railroad.

Finnish White Guards had started their military campaign in March 1918. Their goal was to annex White Karelia from Bolshevist Russia. British Royal Marines had invaded Murmansk at the same time to prevent the Germans and their Finnish White Guard allies from gaining the White Sea coast and the Murmansk Railroad.

The Murmansk Legion was armed with British equipment and wore British uniforms. The Legion was led by Oskari Tokoi and Verner Lehtimäki, who were both promoted to colonel by the British Navy. Strength of the Legion peaked in February 1919 and was about 1,200 men. The Murmansk Legion was initially approved by Lenin, but he later condemned it, as did the communists left behind in Finland, since the British were on the side of the White movement. However, the Finns in the Legion refused to fight the Bolsheviks.

Following the German surrender, the status of the Murmansk Legion changed as the Allies and Soviet Russia became enemies. The Finnish commander of the Murmansk Legion, Verner Lehtimäki, stayed loyal to the Bolshevik government, but August Wesley, Oskari Tokoi, and Karl Emil Primus-Nyman supported the Allies. They urged the Finnish working class to reject communism and join them in pursuit of a democratic socialist Finland. The exiled Communist Party of Finland declared the three to be traitors. Shortly after, Wesley exposed a plan by Lehtimäki to mutiny and attack Finland. As a result, Lehtimäki and a number of others, including Iivo Ahava, were dismissed from the Legion and joined the Bolsheviks.

The Murmansk Legion was disbanded in 1919 as the British troops withdrew. The Finnish government regarded them as traitors but the United Kingdom and the United States made their recognition of Finnish independence conditional on the new government expelling several German agents and pardoning the legionnaires. In the autumn of 1919 most of the Murmansk Legion fighters returned to Finland but some 20 highest-ranked officers such as Tokoi, Lehtimäki, Aarne Orjatsalo and Hannes Sula fled to North America. Some legionnaires later joined the International Brigades in the Spanish Civil War and a few of the youngest even fought in the Finnish Army during World War II.
