= Carl Nordensvan =

Finnish soldier

Carl Lennart Nordensvan
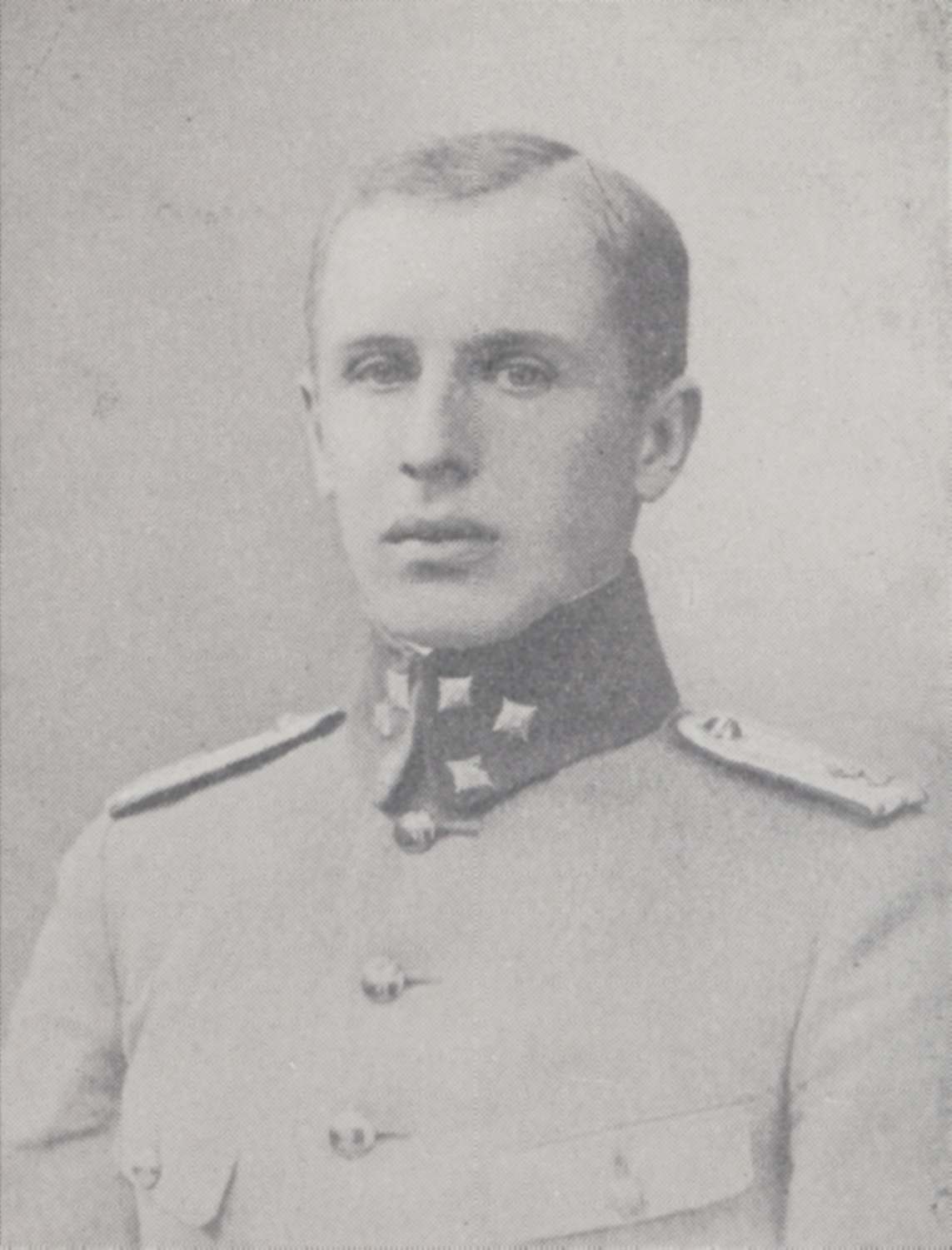
- Born: October 17, 1892; Kuopio, North Savo, Grand Duchy of Finland
- Died: October 27, 1980 (aged 88); Ekenäs, Uusimaa, Finland
- Military career
- Allegiance: German Empire; Finnish Whites; Finland
- Branch: Imperial German Army; Finnish Army
- Service years: 1915–1921; 1939–1945
- Conflicts: World War I; Finnish Civil War; Battle of Vilppula; Battle of Tampere; World War II; Winter War; Continuation War
- Awards: Cross of Liberty 3rd Class

Carl Lennart Nordensvan (October 17, 1892, in Kuopio – October 24, 1980, in Ekenäs), was a Finnish soldier and automobile businessman. He is notable for his service as a member of the Finnish Jäger Movement during the First World War and in the Finnish Civil War, for organizing the Finnish Army Automobile Troops following the civil war, as well as for his pioneering efforts in the automobile industry and motor sports in Finland.

== Biography ==
=== Early life ===
Nordensvan was born on October 17, 1892, in Kuopio to Hovineuvos Carl Magnus Nordensvan and Mathilda Robertina Åberg. He graduated from the Svenska normallyceum in Helsinki in 1912 where he was a member of the Nylands Nation. He studied at the Helsinki University of Technology from 1912 to 1915. In 1919, he married Märta Dagmar Lindeberg, daughter of Ture Valdemar Lindeberg and Selma Sofia Matilda Adlercreutz.

=== Jäger Movement and military service ===
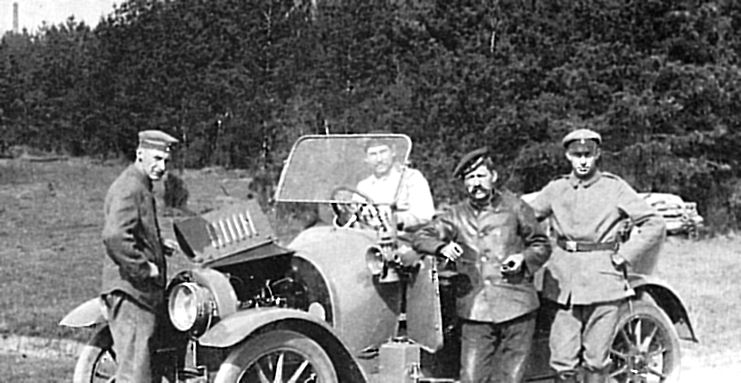
Photo from the 1917 motor vehicle course in Libau.

Starting from 1915, Nordensvan took part in the Finnish Jäger Movement. Members of the movement traveled to Germany, where they formed the 27th Royal Prussian Jäger Battalion and fought for the Imperial German Army on the Eastern Front of World War I. During his training, Nordensvan attended a military vehicle course in Libau and taught courses on the use of explosives and motorcycles. During his service in the Imperial German Army, Nordensvan took part in the battles in the areas of Misa, Riga, Schmarden and Aa. Nordensvan was promoted to squad leader (German: Gruppenführer) on May 2, 1916. He returned to Finland through Sweden in December 1917 to participate in the Finnish Civil War on the side of the Finnish Whites.

Back in Finland, Nordensvan saw action in the region of Vilppula, where he oversaw small-unit actions including the destruction of several railway bridges and the capture of Ruovesi. Later on, he participated in the battles for Tampere and Viipuri. During 1918, Nordenswan was promoted first lieutenant and soon after captain.

Following the end of the civil war, later in 1918, Nordensvan acted as the commander of the Vaasa Regiment until it was disbanded later that year. He was then transferred to the Finnish General Staff, where his task was to prepare and plan the establishment of a unified command for all Finnish Army motorized forces. This work led to the founding of the Finnish Army Automobile Forces on January 20, 1919. Consisting initially of 5 officers, 17 non-commissioned officers and 64 other ranks, the command of the unit was given to Nordensvan. The unit soon grew in size as it began to train conscripts. The unit was renamed Car Battalion (Finnish: Autopataljoona) in late 1920. Nordensvan retired from the army on October 19, 1921, as a major, but remained part of the military reserve.

=== Civilian life ===
Following his retirement from the army, Nordensvan became a technical advisor and sales manager Hans Koch OY, a Finnish limited liability company until 1926. In 1926 he founded Oy Auto-Via Ab and was the company's CEO until 1929, after which he was chairman of the board for Oy Kelton Ab until 1932. Later, he became involved in the construction industry, founding the company Oy Saseka Ab. He was intimately involved with the running of the company until the start of the Winter War in late 1939.

In addition to his business pursuits, Nordensvan was highly involved in the Finnish motoring and motor sports, chairing the motor sports section of Suomen Automobiiliklubi (English: Finnish Automobile Club) and Suomen Moottoripyöräklubi (English: Finnish Motorcycle Club) as well as writing for several magazines. According to Kalevi Karusuo, Nordensvan was the first Finnish writer to produce well-informed reports on test drives of cars. Nordensvan also drove competitively, most notably participating in the 1935 Monte Carlo Rally together with Oscar Hampus and Arvo Wall, driving a Chevrolet car.

=== Winter War and the Continuation War ===
Nordensvan returned to military service for the Finno-Soviet Winter War, which broke out in late 1939. Following the end of the war he was promoted to lieutenant colonel in July 1940 and awarded the Cross of Liberty 3rd Class in August of the same year.

Nordensvan's home in Siuntio was on land taken over by the Soviet Union during the creation of the Porkkala Naval Base in the aftermath of the Continuation War. Nordensvan moved with his family to Ekenäs, where he founded a car sales company, and was CEO of the company until the mid-1950s. Nordensvan died in Ekenäs on October 27, 1980.
