= Väärinmaja =

Village in Ruovesi, Finland

Coordinates: 61.952521°N 24.265244°E

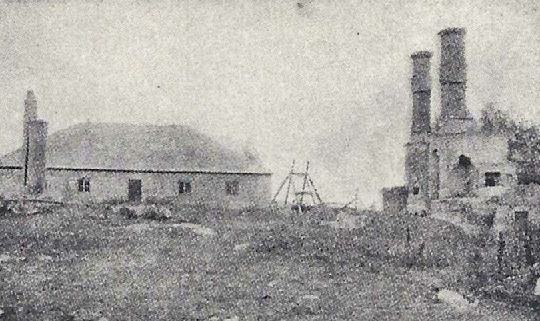
The Battle of Väärinmaja of the 1918 Finnish Civil War. Demolished Red Guard headquarters.

Väärinmaja is a village in the municipality of Ruovesi in the Pirkanmaa region, Finland. The village is known for the Battle of Väärinmaja during the 1918 Finnish Civil War. In 2008–2010, Väärinmaja hosted a stage of the World Rally Championship event Rally Finland.
