= Simo, Finland =

Simo
- Municipality
- Simon kunta Simo kommun
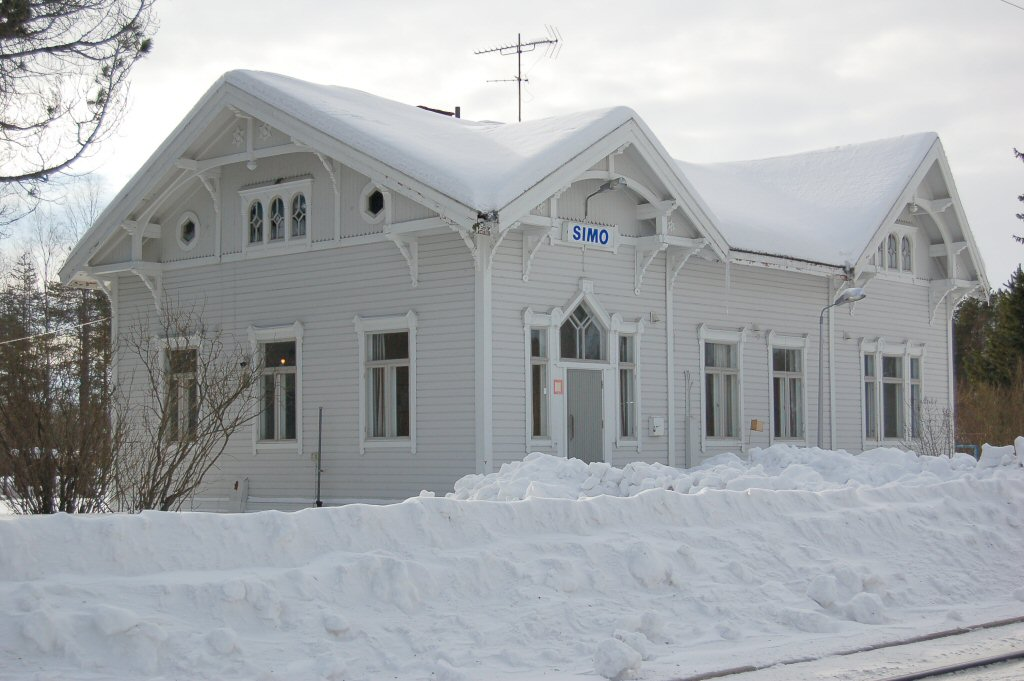
- Simo railway station

- Coat of arms

- Location of Simo in Finland
- OpenStreetMap Interactive map outlining Simo.
- Interactive map of Simo
- Coordinates: 65°39.5′N 025°04′E
- Country: Finland
- Region: Lapland
- Sub-region: Kemi–Tornio
- Charter: 1608/1865

Government
  - Municipal manager: Esko Tavia

Area (2018-01-01)
  - Total: 2,086.29 km^{2} (805.52 sq mi)
  - Land: 1,446.3 km^{2} (558.4 sq mi)
  - Water: 639.89 km^{2} (247.06 sq mi)
  - Rank: 45th largest in Finland

Population (2025-12-31)
  - Total: 2,701
  - Rank: 224th largest in Finland
  - Density: 1.87/km^{2} (4.8/sq mi)

Population by native language
  - Finnish: 99% (official)
  - Others: 1%

Population by age
  - 0 to 14: 13.5%
  - 15 to 64: 51.7%
  - 65 or older: 34.8%
- Time zone: UTC+02:00 (EET)
  - Summer (DST): UTC+03:00 (EEST)
- Website: www.simo.fi

Simo is a municipality located in the province of Lapland, Finland, about 50 kilometres (30 mi) from the Swedish border.

The municipality has a population of 2,701 (31 December 2025) and covers an area of 2,086.29 square kilometres (805.52 sq mi) of which 639.89 km^{2} (247.06 sq mi) is water. The population density is 1.87 inhabitants per square kilometre (4.8/sq mi). In 2001, Simo's debt per capita was 946.39 Euros.

Simo's three largest neighbouring towns are Oulu (217,469 inhabitants), Kemi (19,339 inhabitants) and Tornio (20,823 inhabitants). Some of the bigger neighbouring municipalities are Keminmaa (7,576 inhabitants) and Ii (9,755 inhabitants).

== History ==
=== Early history ===
The oldest residential areas of Simo are the Simonkylä and Maksniemi regions. The oldest records of human habitation within Simo is found in the village of Simonkylä, which was occupied during the 1300s. In the 1500s the population of Simo began to grow as a result of migration, the population increased especially in the villages of Simonkylä and Simoniemi. Simo was known for its large farms and fishermen.

=== Development over the course of time ===
In the 1800s the population gradually began to expand along the beaches of the Simojoki river. In the year of 1865, a large municipal reform occurred in which the municipality, named Simo, received its actual borders, even though the area had long been referred to as Simo and the residents as simolaiset.

=== Lapland War ===
During the Lapland War, the village of Maksniemi suffered serious damage. Bridges along the Simojoki river were blown up by the German forces, which is why for quite some time after the war Simojoki had to be crossed by ferry. The destruction of the connection that the bridges provided was important as it cut off the municipality of Simo from Finnish Highway Four.

== Geography ==
Simo is situated by the Bothnian Bay, at the mouth of river Simojoki. In Simo there is a rural landscape and also in the planning of the centre an attempt has been made to emphasise the nature vicinity. Simo consists of many small and vital village communities. Simo's sights include Simo's Church which was completed in 1846 during the late Empire time and light infantryman place with its statues which will be a memory from the war of independence when the route goes through Simo's wildernesses.

=== Islands ===
Islands within Simo are inclusive of:

- Haahka
- Halttari
- Harvakari
- Härkäletto
- Junkiletto
- Koivuluoto
- Korkiakari
- Kuralanletto
- Laitakari
- Lammasletto
- Leipäre
- Leipäreenkrunni
- Lissabon
- Louekari
- Montaja
- Munakari
- Möyly
- Oravainen
- Paavonletto
- Palokarinletto
- Paskaletto
- Pensasletot
- Peurankallio
- Pihlajakari
- Pikku-Leipäre
- Pirttisaari
- Rajaletto
- Saapaskari
- Selkäkari
- Selkäkarinmatala
- Tiuranen
- Tiurasenkalla
- Tiurasenkrunni
- Tynttyrit
- Vatunki
- Ykskivi
- Ööperit

=== Villages ===
The villages of Simo are inclusive of:

- Alaniemi
- Asemakylä
- Hamari
- Karisuvanto
- Koivuoja
- Maksniemi
- Malininperä
- Matala
- Ojalanperä
- Onkalonperä
- Patokoski
- Pömiö
- Simoniemi
- Simonkylä
- Siperianperä
- Soikko
- Taininiemi
- Viantie
- Ylikärppä

== Economy ==
In Simo there is no industry. In 2007–2011, Fennovoima considered to build a 1,500 to 2,500 megawatt nuclear power plant in Karsikko and Laitakari. However, Fennovoima announced in October 2011 that the power plant would be built at Pyhäjoki.

== Education ==
Simo has three elementary schools, one secondary school and a high school. The nearest university is in Oulu.

== Notable individuals ==
- Aarne Orjatsalo, actor
- Esko Tavia, Mayor of Simo from 2002 - 2015
- Juha Marttila, MTK chairman
- Martti Miettunen, Minister of State, three times Prime Minister
- Matti Lackman, Ph.D, principal investigator and philosopher
- Seppo Lohi, Doctor of Theology
- Tuomas Lohi, Mayor of Kempele
- Veikko Huovinen, writer (born in Simo)
- Veli Räsänen, lichenologist
- Martti Räsänen, linguist, turkologist
