= Martti Räsänen =

Finnish linguist and turkologist (1893–1976)

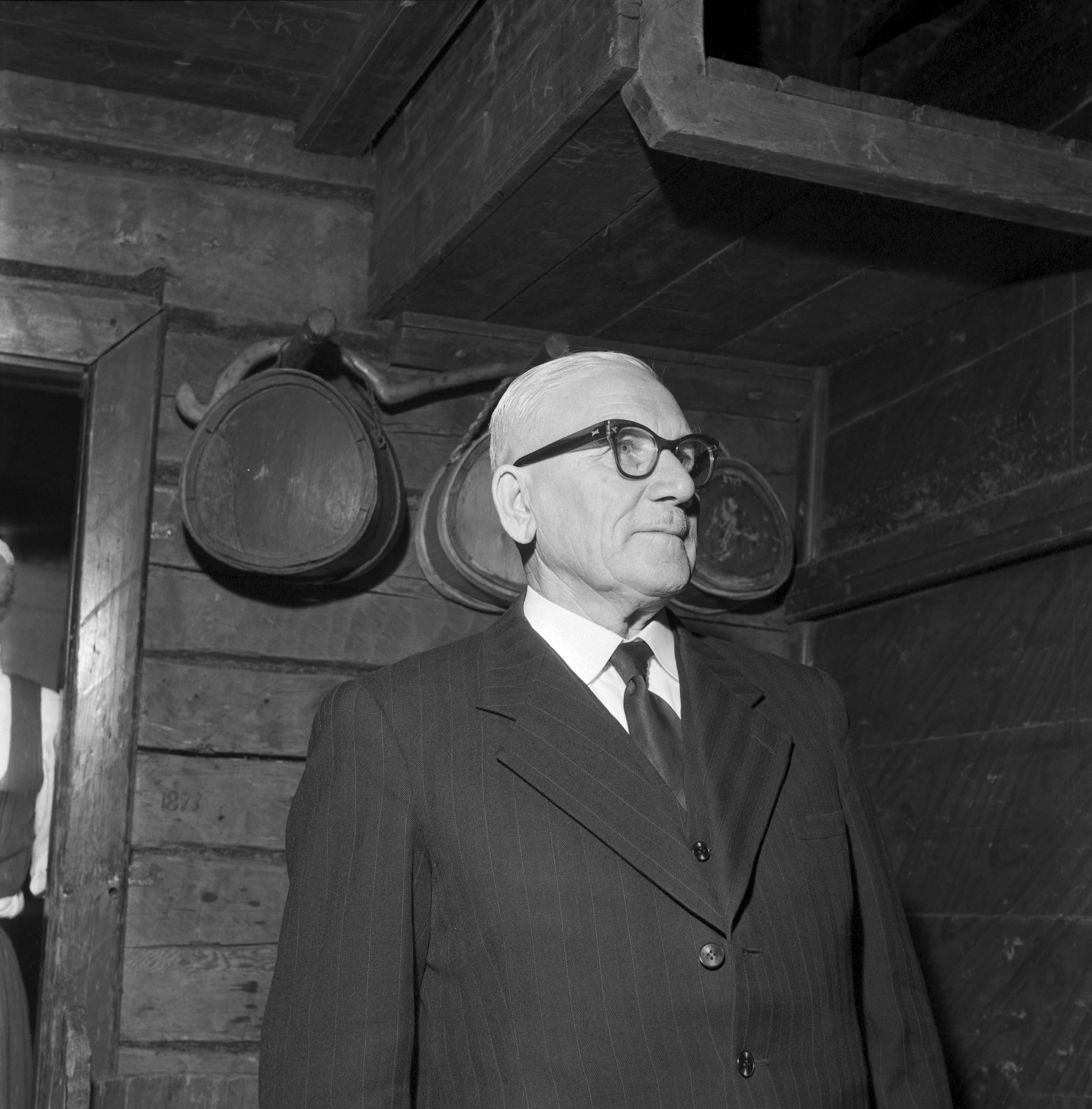
Martti Räsänen at Seurasaari museum in Helsinki, 1959.

Arvo Martti Oktavianus Räsänen (June 25, 1893 – September 7, 1976) was a Finnish linguist and turkologist. He operated as a docent of turkology at University of Helsinki from 1926 forwards, and as an additional professor of Turkic philology from 1944 to 1961.

Räsänen studied in Finland and also in Kazan from 1915 to 1917 and in Budapest during 1924 to 1925.

Räsänen did many exploration trips to Central Europe and Turkey. During his time in Turkey, he collected local poetry, songs, fairy tales and stories. He later released the material in a 600-page, four-part publication named Türkische Sprachproben aus Mittel-Anatolien.

Räsänen's field of research was history of words, the relation between Turkic and Finno-Ugric languages and some other similar subjects. He showed interest towards the local Tatar community. Räsänen was a supporter of the Ural-Altaic language hypothesis.

His parents were Volksschule teachers Antti Räsänen and Kaisa Sofia Vuolevi. His brother was a lichen researcher and biologist Veli Räsänen.

Martti Räsänen was married to a German woman named Auguste Brunhilde Ludwig. Räsänen was originally from Simo. He died in Helsinki.

== Works by Räsänen ==
- Die tschuwassischen Lehnwörter im Tscheremissischen. (Ph.D. thesis.) Suomalais-ugrilaisen seuran toimituksia 48. (Helsinki 1920)
- Die tatarischen Lehnwörter im Tscheremissischen. Suomalais-ugrilaisen seuran toimituksia 50. (Helsinki 1923)
- Eine sammlung von māni-liedern aus Anatolien. Suomalais-ugrilainen seura, Helsinki (1926)
- Chansons populaires turques du nord-est de l'Anatolie Recueillies .... Studia Orientalia 4, 2. Societas Orientalis Fennica, Helsinki (1931)
- Türkische Sprachproben aus Mittel-Anatolien 1: Sivas vil. Studia Orientalia 5, 2. Societas Orientalis Fennica, Helsinki (1933)
- Türkische Sprachproben aus Mittel-Anatolien 2: Jozgat vil. Studia Orientalia 6, 2. Societas Orientalis Fennica, Helsinki (1935)
- Türkische Sprachproben aus Mittel-Anatolien 3: Ankara, Kaiseri, Kiršehir, Cǎnkiri, Afion Vil. Studia Orientalia 8, 2. Societas Orientalis Fennica, Helsinki (1936)
- Puolikuun nousu: Havaintoja uudesta Turkista ja sen kansasta. Suomen itämaisen seuran kansantajuisia julkaisuja n:o 8. Gummerus (1937)
- Venäläis-suomalainen sotilassanakirja. Otava (1940)
- Türkische Sprachproben aus Mittel-Anatolien. 4, Konja Vil. Studia Orientalia 10. Societas Orientalis Fennica, Helsinki (1942)
- Venäläinen sotilaslyhennyssanasto. Päämajan tiedusteluosaston julkaisu. (1943)
- Ein Ueberblick über die ältesten Denkmäler der türkischen Sprachen. Studia Orientalia 13, 1. Societas Orientalis Fennica, Helsinki (1946)
- Materialien zur Lautgeschichte der türkischen Sprachen. Studia Orientalia 15. Societas Orientalis Fennica, Helsinki (1949)
- Materialien zur Morphologie der türkischen Sprachen. Studia Orientalia 21. Societas Orientalis Fennica, Helsinki (1955)
- Uralaltaische Wortforschungen. Studia Orientalia 18, 3. Societas Orientalis Fennica, Helsinki (1955)
- Türkische Miszellen. Studia Orientalia 25, 1. Societas Orientalis Fennica, Helsinki (1960)
- Versuch eines etymologischen Wörterbuchs der Türksprachen. Lexica Societatis Fenno-Ugricae 17, 1. Suomalais-ugrilainen seura, Helsinki (1969)
- Versuch eines etymologischen Wörterbuchs der Türksprachen 2: Wortregister. Lexica Societatis Fenno-Ugricae 17, 2. Suomalais-ugrilainen seura, Helsinki (1971)
