= Monument to the Victims of the Intervention =

- ПАМЯТНИК ЖЕРТВАМ ИНТЕРВЕНЦИИ
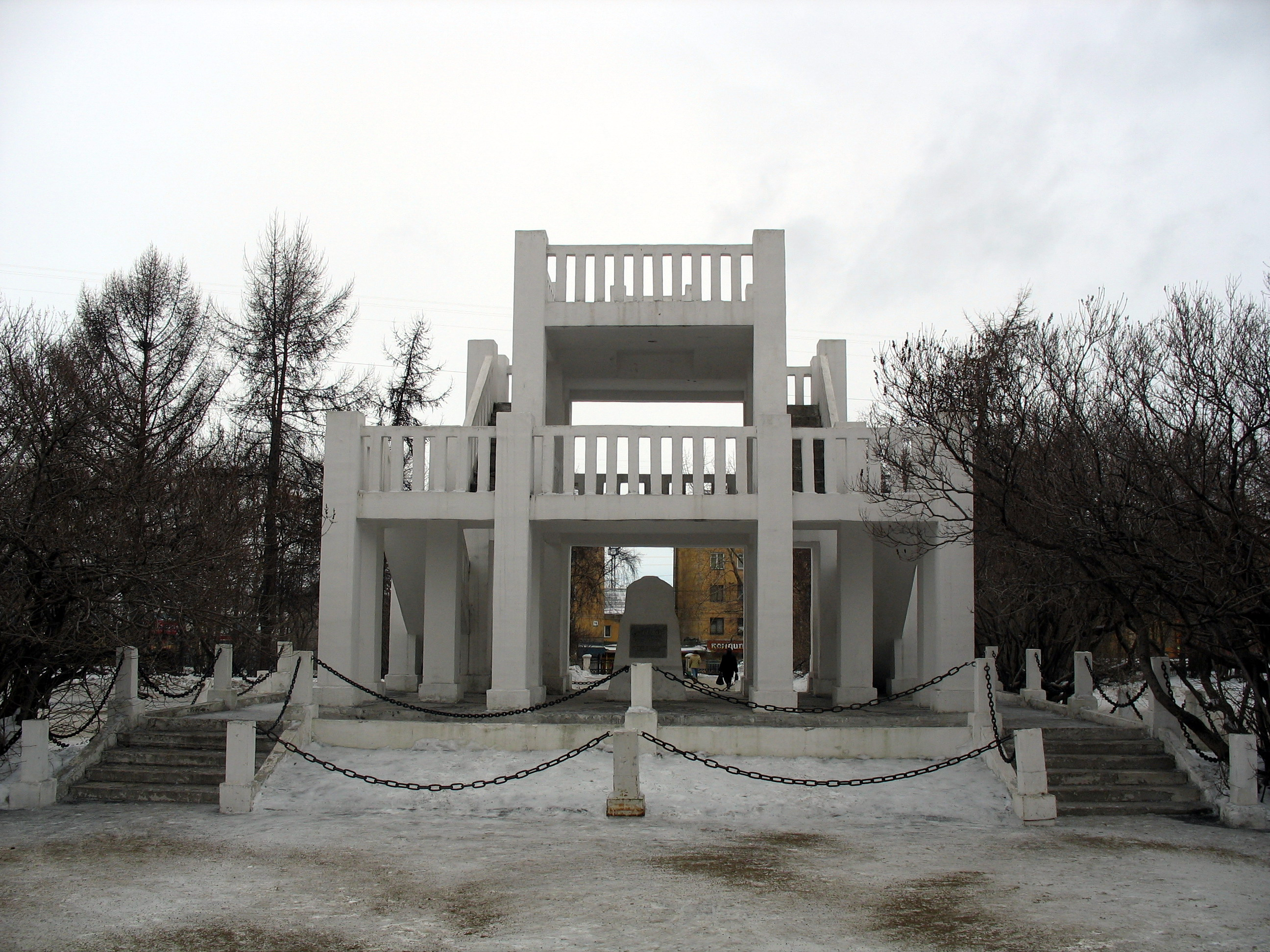
- Interactive map of Monument to the Victims of the Intervention
- Location: Murmansk, Russia
- Coordinates: 68°58′19.3″N 33°04′30.5″E
- Designer: AV Savchenko
- Type: Platform and pedestal
- Material: Reinforced concrete
- Beginning date: September, 1927
- Dedicated date: November 7, 1927
- Dedicated to: Victims of the North Russia Intervention

The Monument to the Victims of the Intervention is a reinforced concrete platform, and pedestal, located in Five Corners Square, Murmansk. It serves as a memorial to the Red Russians killed in engagements during the Russian Civil War, against the White Russians and intervening Allied forces during the North Russia intervention, as well as those that died in captivity. It was designed by the engineer A.V. Savchenko and constructed using funds collected from local residents. The construction took two months, and it was undertaken by the “Murmanskzhilstroy” trust. In 1930 a park was created around the monument.

== History ==
During the Russian Civil War the city of Murmansk was in White Russian territory, and therefore any Red Russians who were found were jailed in Yokang prison. A number of them died. Following the withdrawal of Allied troops after the failed Allied intervention in the Russian Civil War, the White forces mostly collapsed, allowing the Red forces to reintegrate the city into the USSR. At least 136 people were buried in waste ground in the centre of the city and seven years later it was decided that a memorial would be built over this mass grave. A statue of Lenin was also planned but was never built. But Five Corners Square was erected around the monument.

== Description ==
The monument is a three tier raised platform located in the centre of Five Corners Square surrounded by a low post-and-chain style fence, it is made of reinforced concrete that has been painted white. On the lowest tier stands a pedestal bearing a plaque which reads;

Victims of the intervention of 1918–1920.
Murmansk workers and fishermen on the tenth anniversary of the October Revolution.

The stairs to the second tier are located to the rear of the monument and feature a handrail which extends onto the platform. The stairs to the third tier are facing the front of the monument and begin on the second tier, like the steps to the second tier they feature a handrail which extends onto the platform. The square itself has two fountains, a number of benches, and several flower beds. The monument was built under the Constructivism design philosophy.
