= Baltic Fleet during the October Revolution and Russian Civil War =

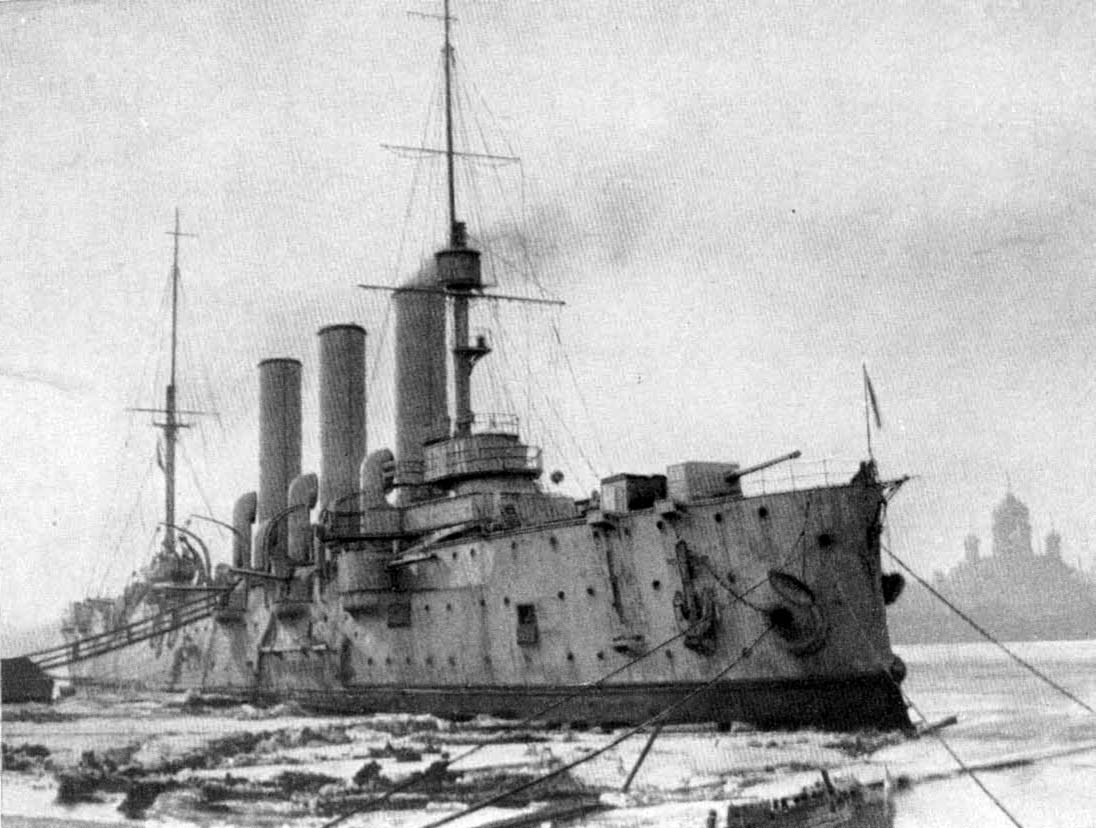

The Russian Baltic Fleet played an important role during the October Revolution and Russian Civil War. During the October Revolution the sailors of the Baltic Fleet (renamed "Naval Forces of the Baltic Sea" in March 1918) were among the most ardent supporters of Bolsheviks, and formed an elite among Red military forces. Some ships of the fleet took part in the Russian Civil War, notably by clashing with the British navy operating in the Baltic as part of intervention forces. Over the years, however, the relations of the Baltic Fleet sailors with the Bolshevik regime soured, and they eventually rebelled against the Soviet government in the Kronstadt rebellion in 1921, but were defeated, and the Fleet de facto ceased to exist as an active military unit.

== Fomenting the revolution ==
Despite the continued World War I, during the winter of 1916-1917 the fleet was inactive: stationed mainly at Helsingfors (Helsinki), Reval (Tallinn), and Kronstadt the ships were literally frozen into the ice or in docks for repair. Summer 1917 was just as passive: the Russian command (Stavka) was fearful of active actions against the superior German fleet and had in mind only the defense of Petrograd. Therefore, the sailors had ample time on their hands and what is more, revolutionary agitators had an easy access to them. The combination of inactivity, low pay, low military morale, hostilities between officers and rank-and-file created an explosive environment, and with the February Revolution the Fleet revolted during the Baltic Fleet Mutiny. In Helsingfors the mutineers killed almost over 50 officers and petty officers, including Fleet commander-in-chief admiral Adrian Nepenin and Rear Admiral Arkady Nebolsin.

In March 1917, the Petrograd Soviet issued its Order No. 1. The order instructed soldiers and sailors to obey their officers and the Russian Provisional Government only if their orders did not contradict the decrees of the Petrograd Soviet. It also called on units to elect representatives to the Soviet and for each unit to elect a sailor/soldier committee which would run the unit. In consequence, the Baltic Fleet had over 500 ship sailor committees, 200 port and shore soviet and 150 coastal defense soldier committees. in April 1917, the Central Committee of the Baltic Fleet (Tsentrobalt) was formed headquartered at Helsingfors.

== See also ==
- Operation Albion
- Battle of Moon Sound
- Ice Cruise of the Baltic Fleet
- British campaign in the Baltic (1918–19) (Russian Civil War in the Baltic Sea)
- Baltic Fleet electoral district (Russian Constituent Assembly election, 1917)
