= Verner Lehtimäki =

Finnish socialist, soldier, pilot, aerospace engineer and revolutionary

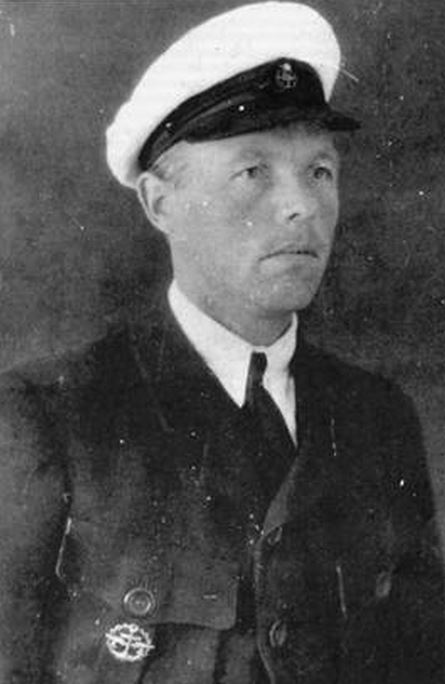
- Lehtimäki in the early 1920s
- Born: 8 June 1890; Vahto, Grand Duchy of Finland, Russian Empire
- Died: 5 April 1938 (aged 47); Soviet Union
- Military career
- Allegiance: Red Finland; Great Britain; Soviet Russia; Soviet Union
- Branch: Red Guards; Murmansk Legion; Baltic Fleet; Soviet Naval Air Force
- Service years: 1918–1923
- Rank: Colonel (British Royal Navy)
- Conflicts: Finnish Civil War; North Russia Intervention; Russian Civil War

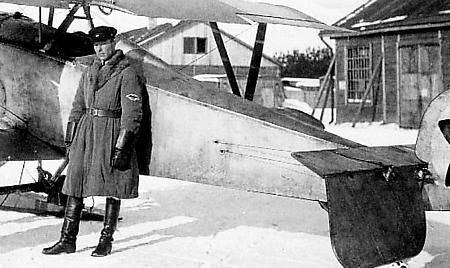
Verner Lehtimäki as a Soviet pilot

Verner Lehtimäki (8 June 1890 – 5 April 1938) was a Finnish socialist, soldier, pilot, aerospace engineer and revolutionary who fought for the Reds during the Finnish Civil War.

== Early life ==
Lehtimäki was born as a peasant's son in Vahto, a small rural municipality in the province of Southwest Finland. He had two brothers who were also enthusiastic socialists. Lehtimäki's younger brother Hjalmar (1896–1934) was a Red Guard leader in the Finnish Civil War. The elder brother, Konrad Lehtimäki (1883–1937), was an author, journalist and a member of Finnish Parliament.

Verner Lehtimäki went to the sea at early age and later emigrated to the United States. He worked first at a New Mexico ranch and in the 1910s on a Mississippi riverboat. In 1916 Lehtimäki moved to Russia where he had a job in a local Vauxhall dealer in Saint Petersburg. After the February Revolution in 1917 Lehtimäki lost his job and started smuggling guns for Finnish revolutionaries. Later the same year Lehtimäki returned to Finland, which was then an autonomous part of Russia.

== Finnish and Russian Civil Wars ==
In the 1918 Finnish Civil War, Lehtimäki fought in the Battle of Vilppula as a commander of a cavalry unit. After the war, Lehtimäki fled to the Soviet Russia and joined the Allied North Russia Intervention as a leader of British organized Murmansk Legion which was composed of former Finnish Red Guards. He was promoted as Colonel by the Royal British Navy. In 1920 he became a pilot in Soviet Russia. Lehtimäki served in the Baltic Fleet as a seaplane pilot and took part on the suppression of the Kronstadt Revolt in March 1921. He was awarded with the Order of the Red Banner. Lehtimäki later graduated from the Zhukovsky Air Force Engineering Academy in Moscow and served as an engineer in the Soviet Naval Air Force in Saint Petersburg.

== Years in China, United States and Soviet Union ==
In 1923 Lehtimäki moved to China with his brother Hjalmar. Lehtimäki worked in a customs office in Shanghai, but he was most likely spying for the Soviets. His wife, a Swiss opera singer Lilly Leemann, was performing with the Shanghai Municipal Orchestra. A year later the Lehtimäki brothers left for the United States where Verner studied aviation and worked for several aviation companies in San Francisco, Chicago and New York. He was also trading airplanes to the Soviet Union where Lehtimäki returned 1932. There he worked in Leningrad as an engineer in the aircraft manufacturing. Lehtimäki took the Soviet citizenship in 1936. His brother Hjalmar died of stomach cancer in 1934 in Moscow.

Verner Lehtimäki was arrested during the Great Purge in January 1938. He was accused of having connections with Finnish socialist Oskari Tokoi who had turned counter-revolutionary. Lehtimäki was then executed on 5 April 1938 but was rehabilitated after Stalin's death in 1957.

== Sources ==
- Harjula, Mirko: "Suomalaiset Venäjän sisällissodassa 1917–1922", Finnish Literature Society, Helsinki 2006. ISBN 951-746-742-7.
- Lehtimäki, Kimmo: "Verner Lehtimäki – Punapäällikkö", Revontuli Publishing, Jyväskylä 2005. ISBN 952-5170-41-1.
