= Oskari Tokoi =

Finnish socialist (1873–1963)

Chairman of the Senate of Finland
- In office March 26, 1917 – September 8, 1917
- Preceded by: Mihail Borovitinov
- Succeeded by: Eemil Nestor Setälä

Personal details
- Born: May 15, 1873 Kannus, Grand Duchy of Finland, Russian Empire
- Died: April 4, 1963 (aged 89) Leominster, Massachusetts, U.S.
- Party: Social Democratic Party

Antti Oskari Tokoi (15 April 1873 – 4 April 1963) was a Finnish socialist politician who served as a leader of the Social Democratic Party of Finland. Tokoi became Chairman of the Senate of Finland in 1917, and thus, he was the world's first social democratic leader of the government. During the short-lived Revolution of 1918, Tokoi participated as a leading figure in the revolutionary government. Tokoi later emigrated to the United States, where he served as the long-time editor of Raivaaja (The Pioneer), the newspaper of the Finnish Socialist Federation.

== Life and Politics ==
=== Early years ===
Oskari Tokoi was born as Antti Oskari Hirvi in Yliviirre parish, Kannus in the Central Ostrobothnia region of Finland on May 15, 1873. The family adopted the surname "Tokoi," the name of a farm purchased by his paternal grandfather, in accordance with common local practice in this period. His father, Kalle, was a farmer and horse-trader.

With the economic situation grim, Tokoi's uncle emigrated to the United States in 1878, inspiring Tokoi's father to follow him in 1881. His father had been one of the few literate people in the area and saw the benefit of reading, so Oskari was enrolled to attend grammar school as a boarder in a neighboring village at the time his father departed for America. Tokoi would be a star pupil at the school, but his parents refused permission for him to attend school after the first four years were completed and literacy attained; Tokoi would never attend a formal educational institution again.

Oskari's father returned to Finland in January 1887. As his brother, Oskari's uncle, had already taken over the family farm, Oskari's father resumed his career as a horse-trader, with mixed success. The interlude proved to be a short one, however, as his father died of an internal ailment at the age of 33, just three months after his return. Tokoi spent the next four years working as a farm laborer for others and for his uncle, with whom he clashed on a personal level.

After severely injuring another boy in a fight, resulting in medical costs, the relationship between Tokoi and his uncle further deteriorated and by mutual consent in January 1891 the 17-year old Oskari quit the family farm to emigrate to America. The next phase of his life had arrived.

=== First American interlude ===
Following a difficult winter journey across the sea beginning in January 1891, Tokoi arrived in the United States and made his way to the coal mines of the state of Wyoming, in which his father had worked before him. Tokoi worked in a series of coal and hard metal mines in Wyoming, Colorado, and the Dakota Territory, joining the radical Western Federation of Miners in connection with his employment.

Loss of employment in the mines later forced him to travel the Midwest in search of work, however.

Tokoi returned to Finland in 1900, where he worked as a farmer and a merchant.

=== Finnish political career ===
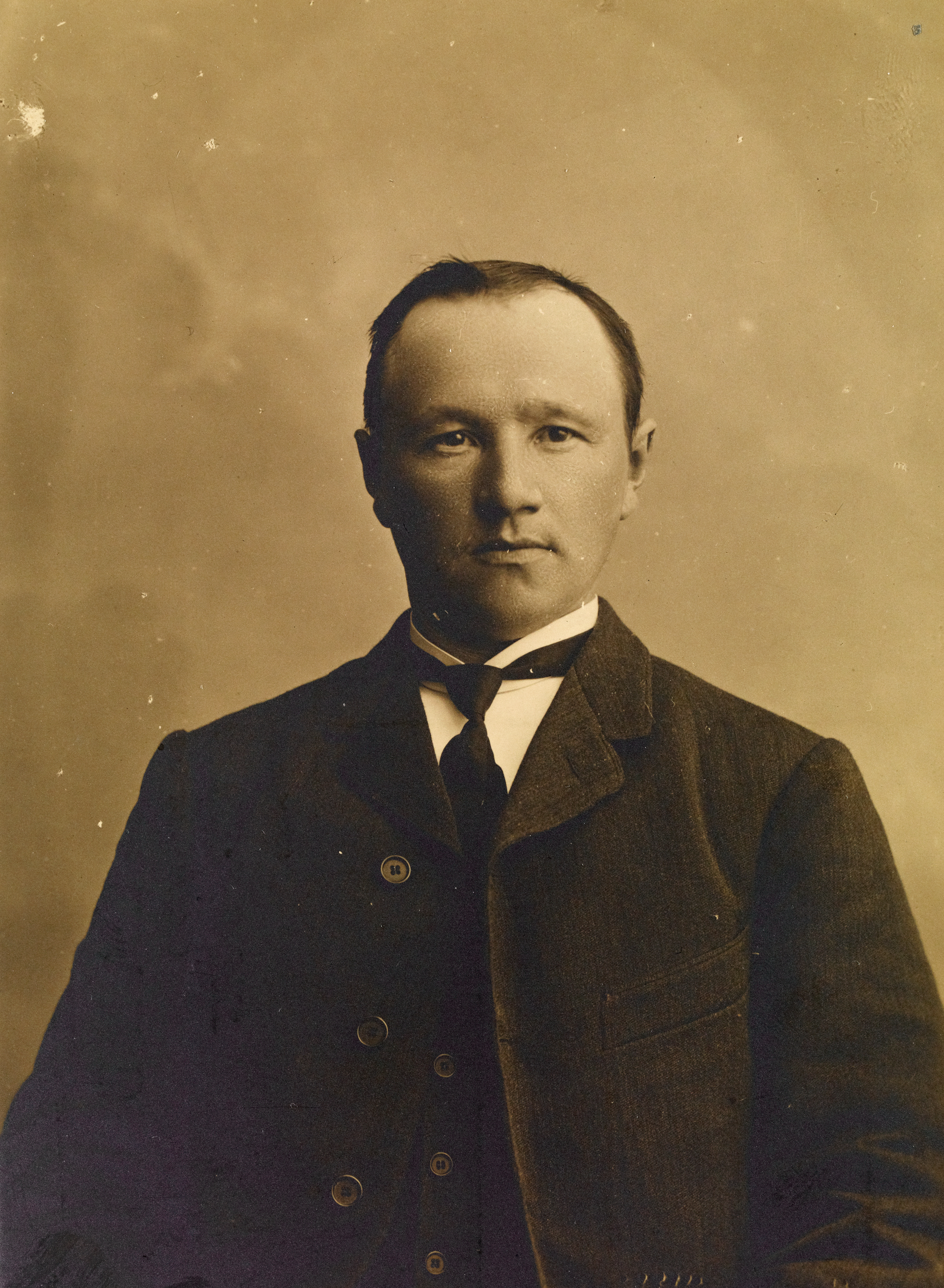
Tokoi in 1900

Tokoi became politically active in 1901, participating in the popular movement against the Russification of Finland. His activity led him to be elected as chairman of the workers' association of Kannus in 1905.

In 1907 Tokoi was elected to the parliament (Eduskunta) as a representative of the Social Democrats. From 1912 to 1917 he was the chairman of the Finnish Trade Union Federation. In 1913 Tokoi was elected as the speaker of the Eduskunta, and in 1917 as the head of the Senate of Finland.

During the Finnish Civil War Tokoi sided with the Communists and worked as the "commissar in charge of provisions" (minister for supply) in the Finnish People's Delegation. After the war, fearing punishment from the victorious Whites, he fled to Russia.

=== Final emigration ===
During 1919 and 1920, he worked as a political advisor to the Murmansk Legion, which was organized by the British against Finnish nationalists who were preparing military expeditions into British controlled parts of Russia. This effort was condemned by the Bolsheviks and Tokoi had to flee again.

Tokoi traveled first to England and from there to Canada, where he remained one year and farmed in the Timiskaming District. On November 21, 1921, Tokoi returned again to the United States via Sault Ste. Marie, Michigan, on his passport issued in England.

He made his way to the Finnish-American colony at Fitchburg, Massachusetts, where he was briefly incarcerated as a suspected anarchist. Held for forced repatriation to Finland, the deportation warrant was ultimately cancelled by the Department of Labor in April 1922, thereby allowing Tokoi to remain in America.

Upon his release, Tokoi became an editor at the Finnish language newspaper Raivaaja (The Pioneer).

During the Winter War of 1939–1940, Tokoi was an active public voice for the cause of Finland.

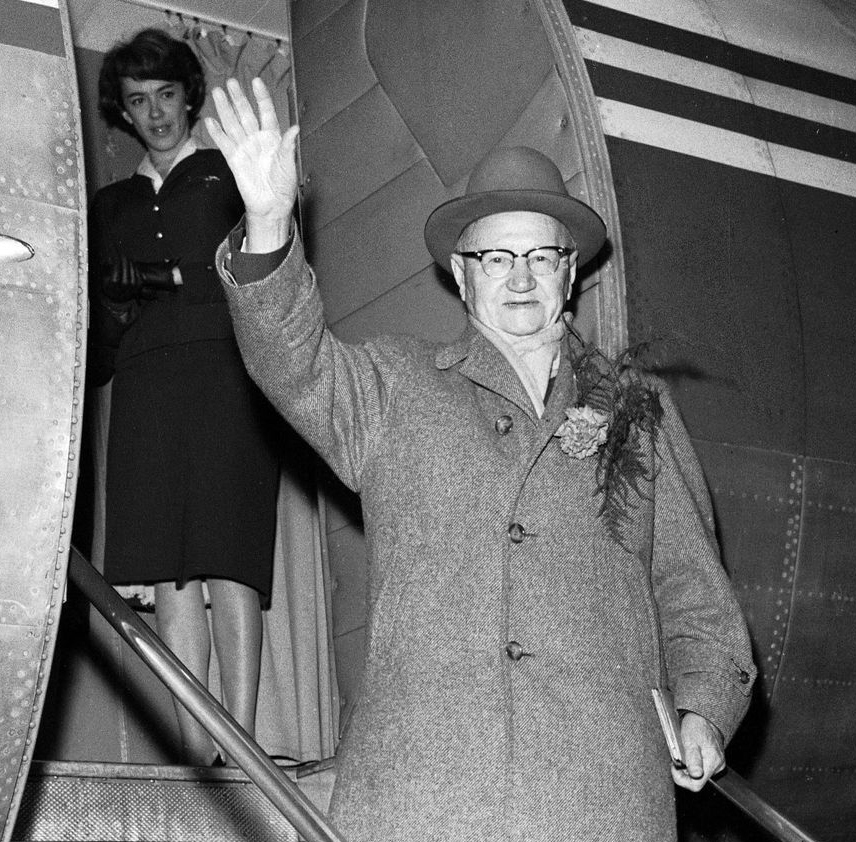
Tokoi visiting Finland in 1958

In 1944, the Finnish Parliament passed the so-called Lex Tokoi, by which Tokoi was exonerated of all charges related to the Finnish Civil War. After World War II he organized help for Finland among the Finnish-Americans. He visited Finland several times in 1949, 1953, 1957 and 1958. In 1957 he attended the 50th anniversary of the Eduskunta.

=== Death and legacy ===
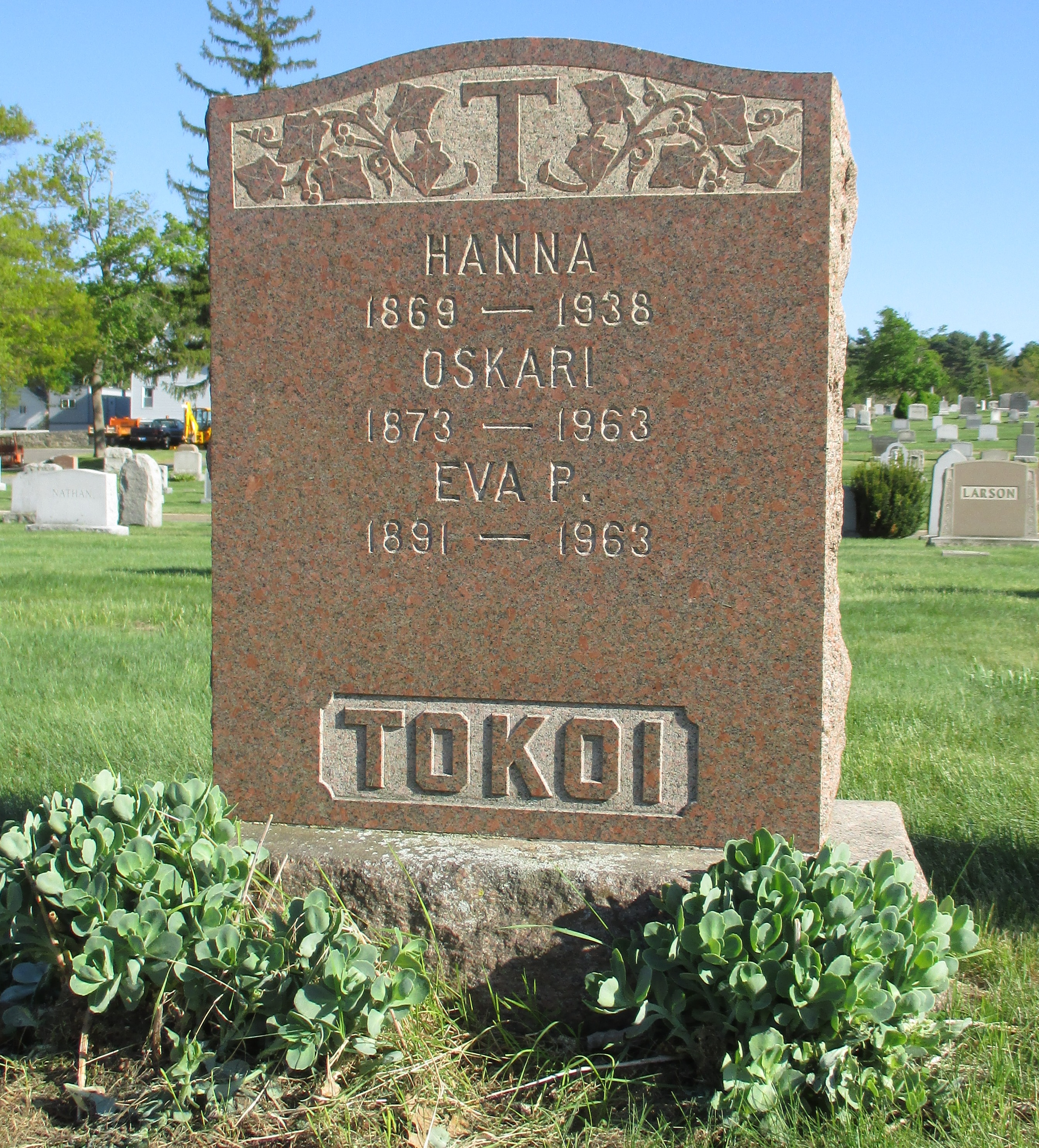
Gravestone of Tokoi in Forest Hill Cemetery

Oskari Tokoi died on April 4, 1963, and he was buried in Forest Hill Cemetery in Fitchburg, Massachusetts. Finland's President Kekkonen visited Forest Hill Cemetery in July 1970, pausing at the grave of the late Oskari Tokoi.

== Political offices ==
- Member of Parliament of Finland—1907 to 1918
- Speaker of the Parliament of Finland—1913
- Chairman of the Senate of Finland—1917

== Memorials ==
- Tokoinranta, a quay in Helsinki, is named after him.
- The Oskari Tokoi Memorial is located in the Finnish Center at Saima Park in Fitchburg, Massachusetts.
- Tokoi was honored with a Wäinö Aaltonen sculpture at Social Democratic Party headquarters in Helsinki.
- On the occasion of the 100th anniversary of his birth, Oskari Tokoi was honored with a memorial in Kannus, Finland.

== Selected works ==
- Sisu: Even Through a Stone Wall: The Autobiography of the First Premier of Finland. New York: Robert Speller & Sons, 1957.
- Keski-Pohjanmaan Maakuntaliitto. Keski-Pohjanmaan Maakuntaliitto, 1953.

Political offices
Preceded by Pehr Evind Svinhufvud	Speaker of the Parliament of Finland; 1913	Succeeded by Kaarlo Juho Ståhlberg
