= North Russia intervention =

1918–1919 Allied intervention in Russia

- Part of Allied intervention in the Russian Civil War
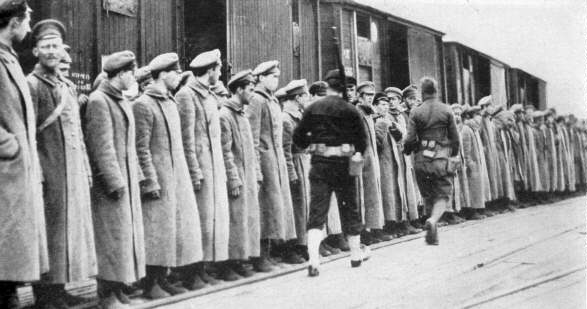
- Red Army prisoners in the custody of US Army troops in Arkhangelsk
Date	4 March 1918 – 12 October 1919 (1 year, 7 months, 1 week and 1 day)
Location	North Russia
Result	Bolshevik victory: Withdrawal of Allied troops

Belligerents
White movement: Russian State Allied powers: United Kingdom; France; United States	Bolsheviks: Russian SFSR; Red Finns	Central Powers: Germany; White Finns

Commanders and leaders
(United Kingdom of Great Britain and Ireland) Edmund Ironside (United Kingdom of Great Britain and Ireland) Frederick Poole (United Kingdom of Great Britain and Ireland) Sir Charles Maynard (Canada) Charles Henry Ludovic Sharman (United States) George E. Stewart (United States) Wilds P. Richardson (Russian State) Nikolai Yudenich (Russian State) Nikolai Tchaikovsky (Russian State) Evgeny Miller	(Russian Soviet Federative Socialist Republic) Jukums Vācietis (Russian Soviet Federative Socialist Republic) Sergey Kamenev (Russian Soviet Federative Socialist Republic) Aleksandr Samoylo (Russian Soviet Federative Socialist Republic) Dmitri Parsky (Russian Soviet Federative Socialist Republic) Dmitry Nadyozhny	(German Empire) Rüdiger von der Goltz; C.G.E. Mannerheim

Strength
Total: 32,614 (United Kingdom of Great Britain and Ireland) 14,378 troops (French Third Republic) 12,378 troops (Note: 590 in Murmansk sector, 274 in Arkhangelsk sector) (Russian State) 7,881 troops (United States) 4,971 soldiers (Kingdom of Italy) 1,520 troops (Kingdom of Serbia) 2,000 troops (Canada) 591	(Russian Soviet Federative Socialist Republic) 45,500	(German Empire) 55,000–70,000 troops

Casualties and losses
(United Kingdom of Great Britain and Ireland) 526+ killed (French Third Republic) 488+ killed (United States) 194 dead, 359 wounded	(Russian Soviet Federative Socialist Republic) 2,150 (Allied estimate)	(German Empire) <1,000

The North Russia intervention, also known as the Northern Russian expedition, the Archangel campaign, and the Murman deployment, was part of the Allied intervention in the Russian Civil War after the October Revolution. The intervention brought about the involvement of foreign troops in the Russian Civil War on the side of the White movement. The movement was ultimately defeated, while the British-led Allied forces withdrew from Northern Russia after fighting a number of defensive actions against the Bolsheviks, such as the Battle of Bolshie Ozerki. The campaign lasted from March 1918, during the final months of World War I, to October 1919.

== Reasons behind the campaign ==
Arkhangelsk Governorate

In March 1917, Tsar Nicholas II in Russia abdicated and was succeeded by a provisional government. The US government declared war on the German Empire and its allies in April, after learning of the former's attempt to persuade Mexico to join the Central Powers. The Russian Provisional Government, led by Alexander Kerensky, pledged to continue fighting Imperial Germany on the Eastern Front. In return, the US began providing economic and technical support to the Russian provisional government, so they could carry out their military pledge.

The Russian offensive of 18 June 1917 was crushed by a German counteroffensive. The Russian Army was plagued by mutinies and desertions. Allied war materiel still in transit quickly began piling up in warehouses at Arkhangelsk (Archangel) and the ice-free port of Murmansk. Anxious to keep Russia in the war, the Royal Navy established the British North Russia Squadron under Admiral Kemp.

The Bolsheviks, led by Vladimir Lenin, came to power in October 1917 and established the Russian Socialist Federative Soviet Republic. Five months later, they signed the Treaty of Brest-Litovsk with Germany, which formally ended the war on the Eastern Front. This allowed the German army to begin redeploying troops to the Western Front, where the depleted British and French armies had not yet been bolstered by the American Expeditionary Force.

Coincidental with the Treaty, Lenin personally pledged that if the Czechoslovak Legion would stay neutral and leave Russia, they would enjoy safe passage through Siberia on their way to join the Allied forces on the Western Front. However, as the 50,000 members of the Legion made their way along the Trans-Siberian Railroad to Vladivostok, only half had arrived before the agreement broke down and fighting with the Bolsheviks ensued in May 1918. Also worrisome to the Allied Powers was the fact that in April 1918, a division of German troops had landed in Finland, creating fears they might try to capture the Murmansk–Petrograd railroad, the strategic port of Murmansk and possibly even the city of Arkhangelsk. It was also feared that large military stores at Arkhangelsk might fall into unfriendly hands.

Faced with these events, the leaders of the British and French governments decided the western Allied Powers needed to begin a military intervention in North Russia. They had three objectives: they hoped to prevent the Allied war materiel stockpiles in Arkhangelsk from falling into German or Bolshevik hands; to mount an offensive to rescue the Czechoslovak Legion which was stranded along the Trans-Siberian Railroad, and resurrect the Eastern Front; and by defeating the Bolshevik army with the assistance of the Czechoslovak Legion, to expand anti-communist forces drawn from the local citizenry.

On November 11, the armistice between Germany and the Allies was signed, marking the end of World War I, which made the goal of re-establishing the Eastern Front obsolete. However, British forces remained. From this point, their primary aims shifted to reinstating a White government and overthrowing the Bolsheviks.

Severely short of troops to spare, the British and French requested that US President Woodrow Wilson provide U.S. troops for what was to be called the North Russia campaign, or the Allied intervention in North Russia. In July 1918, against the advice of the US War Department, Wilson agreed to a limited participation in the campaign by a contingent of U.S. Army soldiers of the 339th Infantry Regiment, that was hastily organized into the American North Russia Expeditionary Force, which came to be nicknamed the Polar Bear Expedition. Under his Aide Memoire, Wilson set the guidelines for American intervention by saying the purpose of American troops in Russia was "to guard military stores which may subsequently be needed by Russian forces and to render such aid as may be acceptable to the Russians in the organization of their own self-defense."

== International contingent ==
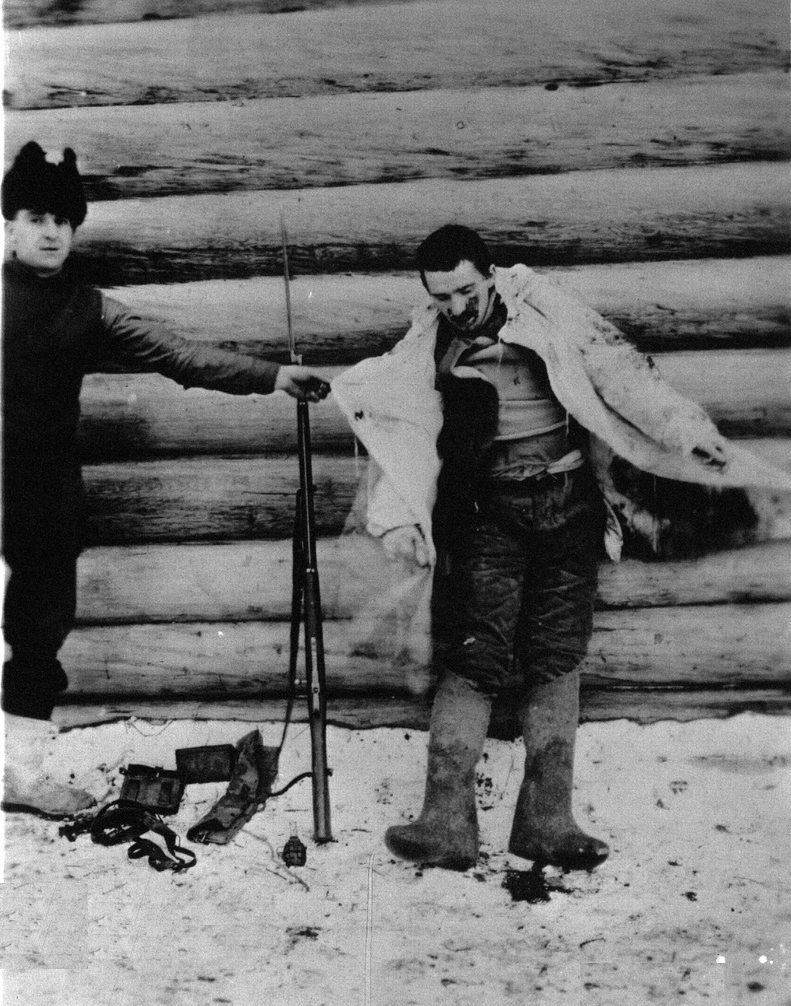
A Bolshevik soldier shot dead by an American guard, 8 January 1919

British Army Lieutenant General Frederick Poole, who had previously spent two years in Russia, was appointed by the British Secretary of State for War, Lord Milner, to lead the expedition to Arkhangelsk.

The international force included:

=== British Empire ===
British Army:
- Headquarters elements,
  - 2/10th (Cyclist) Battalion, Royal Scots,
  - 2/7th Battalion, Durham Light Infantry,
    - 548th (Dundee) Army Troops Company, Royal Engineers,
    - 253rd Company, Machine Gun Corps,
    - Canadian Malamute company of experienced sled dogmen
- 236th Infantry Brigade,
  - 17th (Service) Battalion (1st City), King's (Liverpool) Regiment
  - 6th (Service) Battalion, Green Howards
  - 13th (Service) Battalion, Green Howards
  - 11th (Service) Battalion (1st South Down), Royal Sussex Regiment
- 237th Infantry Brigade,
  - "Karelian Regiment" of three "columns" of 3680 locally recruited Karelians.
  - Two "columns" of Serbian troops amounting to 1120 troops.
- 238th Infantry Brigade,
  - "Finnish Legion" of Red Finns, commanded by British officers.
    - Infantry company from 2/9th (County of London) Battalion, London Regiment
    - Two detached sections from 253rd Company, Machine Gun Corps,
    - Two detached sections from 548th (Dundee) Army Troops Company, Royal Engineers
    - 238th Trench Mortar Battery
- 52nd Battalion, Manchester Regiment,
- and elements of the Royal Dublin Fusiliers.
- Slavo-British Allied Legion (SBAL): a British-trained and led contingent composed mostly of anti-Bolshevik Russian volunteers (including Dyer's Battalion).
- Canadian Field Artillery
  - (67th and 68th Batteries of the 16th Brigade, Canadian Field Artillery)
- Royal Field Artillery
    - 421st Battery
  - (86th and 135th Batteries of the 32nd Brigade)
  - 6th Brigade
    - 420th Battery
    - 434th Battery
    - 435th Battery
    - 1203rd Battery

Royal Navy:
- a flotilla of over 20 ships including the seaplane carriers HMS Pegasus and HMS Nairana
- 6th Battalion Royal Marine Light Infantry (RMLI), (Note: The British 6th Battalion Royal Marines Light Infantry (RMLI) was scratched together from a company of the Royal Marine Artillery and companies from each of the three naval port depots. Very few of their officers had seen any land fighting. Their original purpose had been only to deploy to Flensburg to supervise a vote to decide whether northern Schleswig-Holstein should remain German or be given to Denmark. Many of the Marines were less than 19 years old; it would have been unusual to send them overseas. Others were ex-prisoners of war who had only recently returned from Germany and had no home leave. There was outrage when on short notice, the 6th Battalion was shipped to Murmansk, Russia, on the Arctic Ocean, to assist in the withdrawal of British forces. Still not expecting to have to fight, the battalion was ordered forward under army command to hold certain outposts.)

Royal Air Force:
- contingent comprising Airco DH.4 bombers, Fairey Campania and Sopwith Baby seaplanes along with a single Sopwith Camel fighter.

==== 1919 reinforcements ====
In late May 1919, the British North Russia Relief Force (British Army) arrived to cover the withdrawal of British, US and other anti-Bolshevik forces. It was made up primarily of:

- the 45th Battalion and 46th Battalions, Royal Fusiliers, (Note: Two companies of the 45th Battalion and one of the machine gun companies were composed mainly of Australian volunteers who were veterans of the Western Front: about 200–300 former members of the Australian Imperial Force.)
- 2nd Battalion, Hampshire Regiment,
- 1st Battalion, Oxfordshire and Buckinghamshire Light Infantry.
  - two companies of the 201st Battalion, Machine Gun Corps,
  - an armed company of the Chinese Labour Corps
  - 55th Battery, Royal Garrison Artillery
  - 240th Light Trench Mortar Battery,
  - 241st Light Trench Mortar Battery,
  - 250th Signal Company, Royal Engineers
  - and the 385th Field Company, Royal Engineers.

=== United States ===
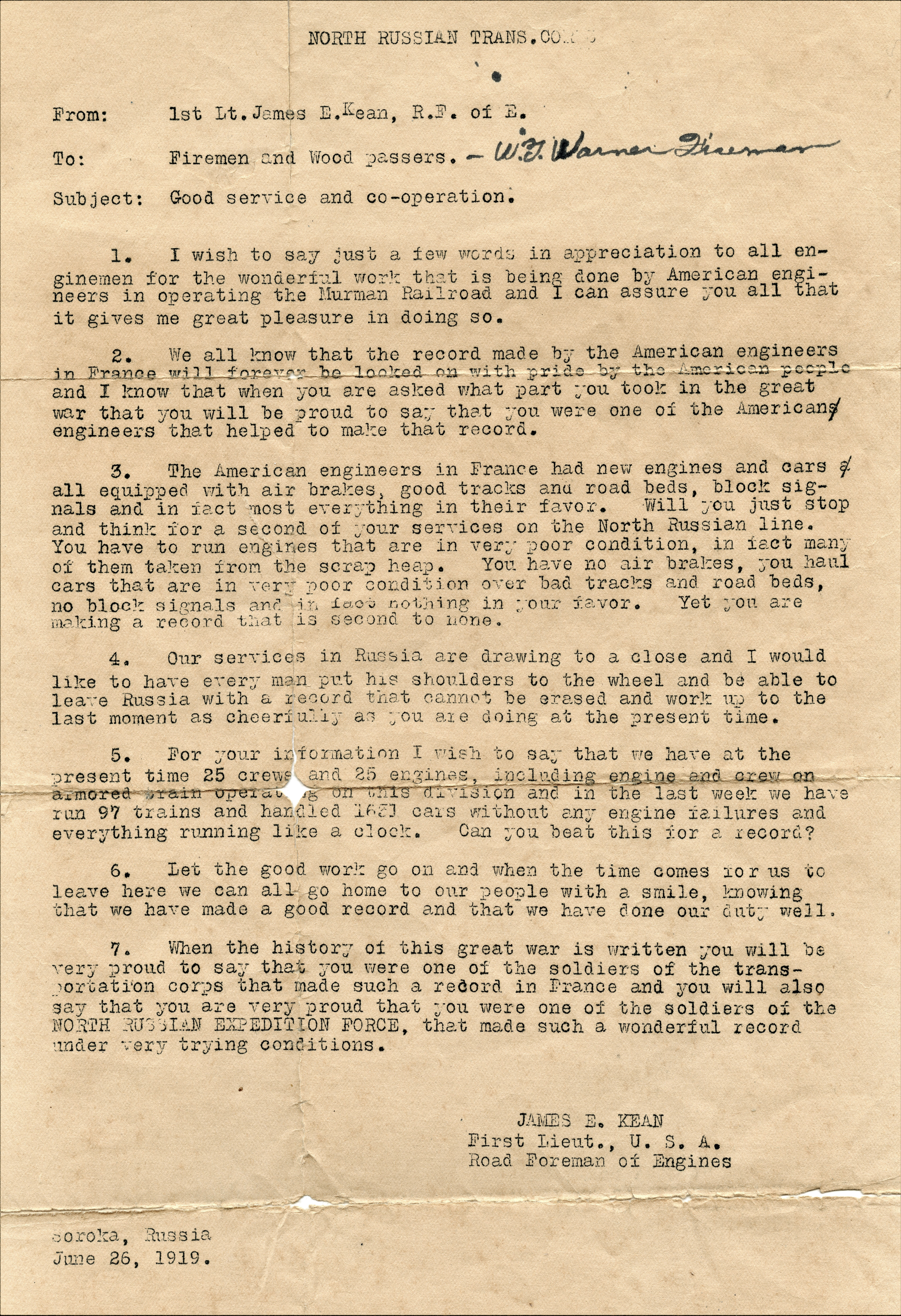
Letter written by US Army 1LT James E. Kean highlighting his unit's mission in Russia – June 26, 1919

North Russia Expeditionary Force (also known as the Polar Bear Expedition): approximately 5,000 personnel from the US Army. including the:
- 310th Engineers,
- 339th Infantry,
- 337th Field Hospital,
- and 337th Ambulance Company.
- Also the 167th and 168th Railroad Companies, which were sent to Murmansk to operate the Murmansk to Petrograd line. US Navy: the cruiser USS Olympia during August and September 1918 (including 53 personnel attached to British naval units).

=== France ===
Predominantly the 21st Provisional Colonial Infantry Battalion, a company of ski troops, and engineers. Three artillery batteries (61st, 62nd, 63rd) of the 2nd Colonial Artillery Regiment provided supporting firepower. This was supplemented with a North Russian battalion of the French Foreign Legion composed of anti-Bolshevik Russian volunteers who, like the SBAL, were recruited locally. For their bravery, they were awarded one Distinguished Service Cross and six Military Medals from the Americans and British respectively.

=== Italy ===
1,350 men in the Corpo di spedizione italiano in Murmania commanded by Colonel Sifola.

=== Russia ===
"White Russian" forces included the Northern Army (previously the army of Alexander Kerensky's provisional Russian government, led by General Evgenii Miller)

=== Other countries ===
1,000 Serbian and Polish infantry attached to Admiral Kolchak's forces in the north (as distinct from his Siberian forces, which included the Czechoslovak Legion).
30 Czechoslovak volunteers, part of them serving directly in British Army and part of them detached from the Czechoslovak Legion and attached to British Army.

== Opposing forces ==
Opposing these international forces were the Bolshevik Sixth and Seventh Red Army, combined in the Northern Front (RSFSR), which was poorly prepared for battle in May 1918.

== Landing at Murmansk ==
The First British involvement in the war was the landing in Murmansk in early March 1918. Ironically, the first British landing in Russia came at the request of a local Soviet council. Fearing a German attack on the town, the Murmansk Soviet requested that the Allies landed troops for protection. Leon Trotsky had ordered the soviet to accept Allied aid after the German invasion of Russia in February–March 1918. 170 British troops arrived on 4 March 1918, the day after the signing of the Treaty of Brest-Litovsk between Germany and the Bolshevik government.

White Finns volunteers who had crossed the border during the Finnish Civil War had captured the Russian town of Pechenga, and it was feared that the Whites would hand over the town to the Germans who would then use the bay as a submarine base. The Germans were allies of the White Finns as they had been assisting them militarily during their Civil War. British troops saw action for the first time in early May, when a party of White Finns ski troops beat off a patrol led by Royal Marines and sailors from HMS Cochrane. The second clash took place on 10 May at Tunturimaja, where Royal Marines and their local guides were outflanked and forced once again to retreat. The British forces, alongside Red Guards, eventually prevailed and secured Pechenga by 11 May with several casualties. In the following months, British forces in the area were largely engaged in small battles and skirmishes with White Finns in support of the Red Army. Command of the British forces in the area was given to Major General Sir Charles Maynard. In late June, 600 British reinforcements arrived. By this time, Soviet–Allied relations were passing from distrust to open hostility. A Bolshevik force was sent to take control of the town up the Murmansk-Petrograd railway, but in a series of skirmishes the Allied forces repelled the attack. This was the first real fighting between the troops of the Allies and Soviet Russia. A trainload of Bolshevik troops was also found at Kandalaksha heading north, but Maynard managed to convince them to stop, before Serb reinforcements arrived and took over the train.

In September, the British forces, who had so far mainly only engaged White Finns in small battles and skirmishes, were reinforced by the arrival of a force of 1,200 Italians as well as small Canadian and French battalions. By early Autumn, British forces under Maynard in the Murmansk region were also 6,000 strong. However, on 11 November, the armistice between Germany and the Allies was signed, ending the First World War, meaning that the primary objective of re-establishing the Eastern Front was now irrelevant. The British forces did not leave. From this point onwards, the sole objectives of the British were to restore a White government and to remove the Bolsheviks from power.

== Landing at Arkhangelsk ==
Russian Civil War in 1918–1919

On 2 August 1918, anti-Bolshevik forces, led by Tsarist Captain Georgi Chaplin, staged a coup against the local Soviet government at Arkhangelsk. British diplomats had traveled to the city in preparation of the invasion, and General Poole had coordinated the coup with Chaplin. Allied warships sailed into the port from the White Sea. There was some resistance at first and Allied ships were fired on, but 1500 French and British troops soon occupied the city. The Northern Region Government was established by Chaplin and popular revolutionary Nikolai Tchaikovsky; to all intents and purposes, however, General Poole ran Arkhangelsk, declaring martial law and banning the red flag, despite the decision of the Northern Region Government to fly it.

It was reported in the British press in early August that the Allied Powers had occupied Arkhangelsk, although not officially confirmed by the British authorities at the time. By 17 August it was being reported that the Allies had advanced to the shores of Onega Bay.

The lines of communications south from Arkhangelsk were the Northern Dvina in the east, Vaga River, Arkhangelsk Railway, the Onega River in the west, and the Yomtsa River providing a line of communication between the Vaga River and the railway in the centre. As soon as Arkhangelsk had been captured, preparations were made for a push southwards along the Arkhangelsk-Vologda railway. An armoured train was commissioned to support the advance, and a battle took place between Allied and Bolshevik armoured trains on 18 August. In September 1918, the Allied Powers took Obozerskaya, around 100 miles (160 km) south of Arkhangelsk. During the attack, the RAF provided air support to the advancing Allied infantry, conducting bombing and strafing runs. On 4 September 1918 the promised American forces arrived. Three battalions of troops, supported by engineers and under the command of Colonel George Stewart, landed in Arkhangelsk. This force numbered 4,500 troops. In early September also an RAF squadron was set up specifically for service at Arkhangelsk, equipped with obsolete RE8 reconnaissance-bomber aircraft.

== Advance along the Northern Dvina ==
A British River Force of 11 monitors (HMS M33, HMS Fox and others), minesweepers, and Russian gunboats was formed to use the navigable waters at the juncture of the rivers Vaga and Northern Dvina. Some 30 Bolshevik gunboats, mines, and armed motor launches took their toll on the allied forces.

The Allied troops, led by Lionel Sadleir-Jackson, were soon combined with Poles and White Guard forces. Fighting was heavy along both banks of the Northern Dvina. The River Force outflanked the enemy land positions with amphibious assaults led by Royal Marines, together with coordinated artillery support from land and river. Their Lewis guns proved to be an effective weapon, since both sides were only armed with bolt-action rifles.

The 2/10th Royal Scots cleared the triangle between the Dvina and Vaga and took a number of villages and prisoners. The strongly fortified village of Pless could not be attacked frontally, so 'A' Company, less one platoon, attempted a flanking movement through the marshes. The following morning the company reached Kargonin, behind Pless, and the defenders – thinking themselves cut off by a large force – evacuated both villages. The regimental historian describes this as 'a quite remarkable march by predominantly B1 troops'.

In mid-September, Allied troops were driven out of Seletskoe, and it took three days for the settlement to be retaken. By late September, Royal Marines and 2/10th Royal Scots had reached Nijne-Toimski, which proved too strong for the lightly equipped Allied force. The monitors having withdrawn before the Dvina froze, the force was shelled by Bolshevik gunboats. In early October, the village of Borok was taken but, after a series of Bolshevik attacks were launched on 9 October, the Scots were forced to withdraw from the village. The Scots lost 5 men in their defence of the village. On 27 October, Allied forces were ambushed at Kulika near Topsa, losing at least 27 men killed and dozens wounded, a figure that could have been higher if it had not been for a detachment of Poles who bravely covered the retreat as others panicked. The Allied force withdrew to a defensive line for the winter, first driving off a number of attacks with the help of a Canadian Field Artillery battery, culminating in a very heavy assault on 11 November. An RAF squadron was set up at Bereznik on the bank of the Dvina, equipped with RE8s. Meanwhile, in October fighting between Bolshevik and American and French troops had occurred along the Arkhangelsk–Vologda railway. US rail troops worked to repair the trainline so as to allow the advance along the line to continue.

The Allied troops were mainly inactive in the winter of 1918, building blockhouses with only winter patrols sent out. On the first occasion that White Russian troops were sent into the line of combat during the North Russian campaign, on 11 December 1918, the White Russian troops mutinied. The ringleaders were ordered to be shot by General Ironside.

== Escalation ==
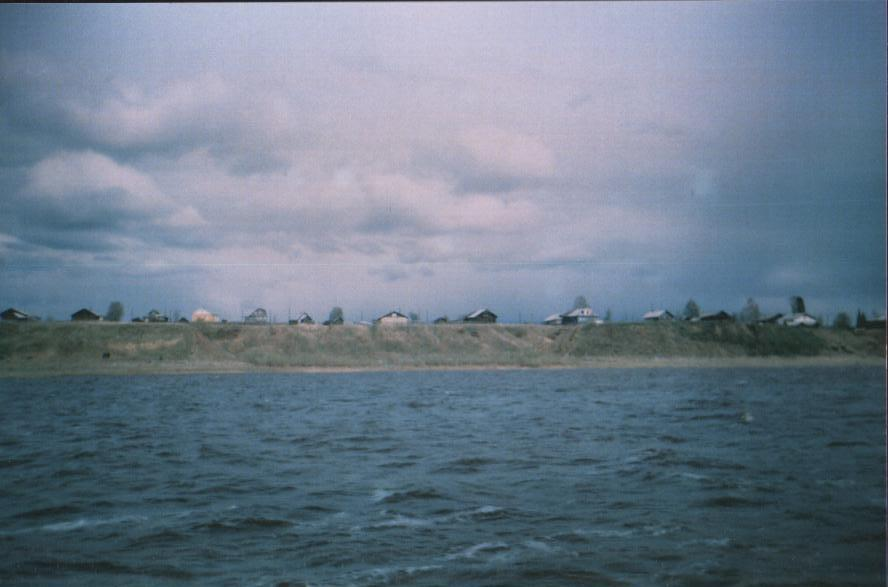
Konetsgorye, view from the Northern Dvina River

Within four months the Allied Powers' gains had shrunk by 30–50 kilometres (19–31 mi) along the Northern Dvina and Lake Onega Area as Bolshevik attacks became more sustained. The Bolsheviks launched their largest offensive yet on Armistice Day 1918 along the Northern Divina front, and there was heavy fighting on Armistice Day 1918 at the Battle of Tulgas (Toulgas) at the Kurgomin–Tulgas line: the final defensive line in 1919. Trotsky as Commander in Chief of the Red Army personally supervised this task on the orders of Lenin. 1,000 Red troops attacked the village, and the American and Scots defenders were driven back rapidly. The field hospital was captured and the large defensive gun batteries were threatened, but after heavy hand-to-hand fighting, the Red troops were pushed away from the guns. The Bolshevik force lost as many as 650 men killed, wounded or taken prisoner, whilst the Americans lost three men and seventeen Scots were killed. The Allied forces had managed to quell the Bolshevik offensive by 14 November. When the news came through of the Armistice with Germany, many of the British troops in Arkhangelsk eagerly anticipated a quick withdrawal from North Russia, but their hopes were soon dashed.

The Bolsheviks had an advantage in artillery in 1919 and renewed their offensive while the Vaga River was hurriedly evacuated. 'A' Company of 2/10th Royal Scots had to be sent to reinforce a heavily pressed force on the Vaga, marching with sledges over 50 miles (80 km) in temperatures 40–60 degrees below freezing. On 27 January 1919, word was received at Arkhangelsk that the Bolsheviks had fired poison gas shells at British positions on the Arkhangelsk–Vologda railway. The use of poison gas by the Bolsheviks was soon announced in the British press. The Bolsheviks would use poison gas shells against the British on at least two occasions in North Russia, although their effectiveness was limited.

On the Dvina front, Tulgas was attacked by the Reds on 26 January. The Bolsheviks originally drove back the American and Scots defenders but the following morning saw the Allied forces retake the settlement after a determined counter-attack. The Bolsheviks continued to attack for the next three days until the Allies decided to withdraw, setting fire to the settlement as they evacuated four days later. The Allied troops then reoccupied the town soon after. By early 1919 the Bolshevik attacks along the Dvina were becoming more substantial.

The River Force monitors made a final successful engagement with the Bolshevik gunboats in September 1919. However two monitors, HMS M25 and HMS M27, unable to sail downstream when the river's levels dropped, were scuttled on 16 September 1919 to prevent their capture by Bolshevik forces.

In the Murmansk sector, the British decided that the only way to achieve success in ejecting the Bolsheviks from power was by raising, training and equipping a large White Russian Army. However, recruitment and conscription attempts failed to provide a sizable enough force. It was therefore decided to move south to capture more populated areas from which recruits could be conscripted. During February 1919, as the British fought defensively against attacking Bolshevik forces, the British decided to launch an offensive, aiming to capture extra territory from which locals could be conscripted. This would be the first significant action on the Murmansk front between the Allies and the Bolsheviks. With a force of only 600 men, most of whom were Canadians, the attack was launched in mid-February. Met with stiff opposition, the town of Segeja was captured and half the Red Army garrison was killed, wounded or taken prisoner. A Bolshevik train carrying reinforcements was intentionally derailed when the line was cut, and any escaping men were cut down by machine-gun fire. During the February offensive, the British forces pushed the Red Army beyond Soroko and as far south as Olimpi. Despite an attempted Bolshevik counter-attack, by 20 February, 3,000 square miles of territory had been taken.

On 22 September, with the Allied withdrawal already ongoing, a British detachment from the Royal Scots was sent by river to Kandalaksha on four fishing boats to stop sabotage operations carried out by Finnish Bolsheviks against the railway there. The British party was ambushed even before landing and suffered heavy casualties, with 13 men killed and 4 wounded. Consequently, the unopposed Bolsheviks destroyed a number of bridges, delaying the evacuation for a time. One of the fatalities, a Private from Ormesby, Yorkshire, who succumbed to his injuries on 26 September, was the last British servicemen to die in action in Northern Russia.

The furthest advance south on the northern front in early 1919 was an Allied Mission in Shenkursk on the Vaga River and Nizhnyaya Toyma on the Northern Dvina where the strongest Bolshevik positions were encountered. The strategicly important city of Shenkursk was described by British commander Ironside as 'the most important city in North Russia' after Arkhangelsk and he was determined to hold the line. However, British and Allied troops were expelled from Shenkursk after an intense battle on 19–20 January 1919, with the Americans losing seventeen men in the process. One American and White Russian force numbering 450 men drove back a Bolshevik force three or four times its size, but suffered some 50 casualties in the process. The battle for Shenkursk took place in -45 degree Celsius temperatures. Over the following days, RAF aircraft flew several bombing and reconnaissance missions to support the withdrawal from Shenkursk. The battle of Shenkursk was a key turning point in the campaign, and the Allied loss put them very much on the back foot for the next few months along the railway and Dvina fronts. On 8 March the Bolsheviks, determined to push the British from their positions on the Vaga, attacked Kitsa. The Reds went as far as using gas shells to bombard the settlement, but all attacks were repulsed. However, with much of the village being destroyed and the Allied force being outnumbered by the enemy, it was decided to withdraw.

On the railway front south of Arkhangelsk, the Allied forces were gradually advancing. On 23 March, British and American troops attacked the village of Bolshie Ozerki, but the first wave of attackers were pushed back. Orders were made to resume the attack the next morning, but some of the British troops protested as they had not had a hot meal for some time. Another assault was repulsed on 2 April. The next day, 500 Bolsheviks attacked Shred Mekhrenga but were eventually repelled, with over 100 Red troops being killed despite the British suffering no fatal casualties. Another Bolshevik attack was launched on Seltskoe, but that attack also failed. In total, the Bolsheviks lost 500 men in one day in the two attacks.

Many of the British and foreign troops often refused to fight, and Bolshevik attacks were launched with the belief that some British troops may even defect to their side once their commanders had been killed. The numerous White mutinies demoralised Allied soldiers and affected morale. The Allied forces were affected by their own mutinies, with the British Yorkshire Regiment and Royal Marines rebelling at points as well as American and Canadian forces. In April, a pre-emptive strike against the Bolsheviks was launched against Urosozero. A French armoured train shelled the town and it was then captured with the loss of 50 Bolshevik troops. A major offensive was then launched in May. On 8 May, Allied positions in Karelskaya came under attack, with 8 men being killed. During the advance on Medvezhyegorsk on 15 May, the stubborn Bolshevik defence was only ended with a bayonet charge. British and Bolshevik armoured trains then traded blows as the British attempted to seize control of more of the local railway. The town was finally seized on 21 May, as Italians and French troops pushed forward with the British. The May offensive never quite carried the Allies as far as the largest town in the region, Petrozavodsk.

After the May offensive, there was a considerable amount of aerial activity around Lake Onega. The British constructed an airfield at Lumbushi, and seaplanes were brought in to add to the force of 6 R.E.8 planes. The seaplanes bombed Bolshevik vessels, sinking four and causing the capture of three, including an armoured destroyer.

In April, public recruiting began at home in Britain for the newly created 'North Russian Relief Force', a voluntary force which had the claimed sole purpose of defending the existing British positions in Russia. By the end of April 3,500 men had enlisted, and they were then sent to North Russia. Public opinion regarding the formation of the force was mixed, with some newspapers being more supportive than others. The relief force eventually arrived in North Russia in late May–June.

On 25 April a White Russian battalion mutinied, and, after 300 men went over to the Bolsheviks, they turned and attacked the Allied troops at Tulgas. The Canadian defenders had to withdraw six miles to the next village, where attacks were eventually beaten off after heavy casualties. The capture of Tulgas by the Bolsheviks meant that the Reds now held the left bank of the Dvina 10 miles behind the Allied line. On 30 April the Bolshevik flotilla appeared – 29 river craft – and, together with 5,500 troops, attacked the 550 total Allied troops in three area. Only superior artillery saved the Allied forces, with the river flotilla eventually withdrawing. Tulgas was then eventually recaptured.

In May and June, the units of the original British force which had arrived in Arkhangelsk in August and September 1918 finally received orders for home. In early June the French troops were withdrawn and the Royal Marines detachment was also sent home, followed by all Canadian troops after it was requested that they be repatriated. All remaining American troops also left for home. The Serbian troops (perhaps Maynard's best infantry fighters) became unreliable as others withdrew around them. By 3 July, the Italian company was on the verge of mutiny as its men were seriously disaffected with their continued presence in Russia so long after the Armistice. In mid July, the two companies of American railway troops were also withdrawn. The Royal Marines unit had been expressing its dissatisfaction with being forced to stay in Russia after the Armistice since February, and had been openly demanding to their commanding officers that they be sent home. Threatening letters were sent to their officers stating that if they were not repatriated, the men would commandeer the first train going to Murmansk. The men became increasingly unwilling to participate in serious military action throughout 1919. The French and American troops stationed in the north were similarly reluctant to fight, and French troops in Arkhangelsk refused to take part in any action that was not merely defensive. During June, small naval battles occurred on Lake Onega between Allied and Bolshevik ships. The Bolshevik forces were completely taken by surprise when British seaplanes emerged and attacked. The settlement of Kartashi was captured during the month. Despite being told when volunteering that they were only to be used for defensive purposes, plans were made in June to use the men of the North Russian Relief Force in a new offensive aimed at capturing the key city of Kotlas and linking up with Kolchak's White forces in Siberia. The villages of Topsa and Troitsa were captured in anticipation of this action, with 150 Bolsheviks being killed and 450 being captured. However, with Kolchak's forces being pushed back rapidly, the Kotlas offensive was cancelled.

In early July 1919, another White unit under British command mutinied and killed its British officers, with 100 men then deserting to the Bolsheviks. Another White mutiny was foiled later in the month by Australian troops. On 20 July, 3,000 White troops in the key city of Onega mutinied and handed over the city to the Bolsheviks. The loss of the city was a significant blow to the Allied forces as it was the only overland route available for the transfer of supplies and men between the Murmansk and Arkhangel theatres, a particularly vital line of communication during the months of the year when the White Sea froze over rendering Arkhangel inaccessible to maritime traffic. This event led to the British losing all remaining trust for the Whites and contributed to the desire to withdraw. Attempts were soon made to retake the city, but in a failed attack in late July the British had to force detachments of White forces to land at gunpoint in the city, since they were adamant that they would not take part in any fighting. On one Allied ship, 5 Bolshevik prisoners captured in battle even managed to temporarily subdue the 200 White Russians on board and take control of the ship with little resistance. Despite the Allied setbacks, a battalion of marines, the 6th Royal Marine Light Infantry, was sent to assist the British at the end of July.

== Final offensives ==
The final two months on the Dvina front, August and September 1919, would see some of the fiercest fighting between British and Red Army troops of the Civil War. In August, a major offensive was launched along the Dvina to try and strike a blow at Bolshevik morale and to increase the morale of the White forces before a withdrawal. As part of this, an attack was made on the village of Gorodok. Before the attack began, 6 RAF DH.9s, 5 DH.9As and two Sopwith Snipes dropped three tonnes of bombs on the village in two successful raids, and on 10 August British planes also dropped bombs on other Bolshevik held villages. During the attack, 750 Bolshevik prisoners were taken, and one battery was found to have been manned by German troops. The village of Seltso was also attacked, but a strong Bolshevik defence halted any British progress. However, the villages of Kochamika, Jinta, Lipovets and Zaniskaya were captured with little resistance. In total the offensive led to the deaths of around 700 Reds and was considered a success. There was also action on the railway front south of Arkhangelsk at this time, and a raid on the settlement of Alenxandrova took place on 19 August. On 24 August, there was an aerial dogfight between a British R.E.8 aircraft and two Bolshevik Nieuport fighters over the Pinega River, with the British plane only returning safely when the observer flew 100 miles back to base whilst his pilot lay unconscious. (Note: The R.E.8 had basic duplicate flight controls in the observer's cockpit which folded out of way when not in use.) On 10 September, the city of Onega was retaken. The American River Force monitors made a final successful engagement with the Bolshevik gunboats in September 1919. However two British monitors, HMS M25 and HMS M27, unable to sail downstream when the river's levels dropped, were scuttled on 16 September 1919 to prevent their capture by Bolshevik forces.

A final offensive on the Murmansk front was launched by the Allied forces in September, aimed at destroying the Bolshevik forces to leave the White forces in a good position after the planned withdrawal. On 28 August 1918 the British 6th Royal Marine Light Infantry Battalion was ordered to seize the village of Koikori (Койкары) from the Bolsheviks as part of a wide offensive into East Karelia to secure the British withdrawal to Murmansk. Serbian forces supported the British as they attempted to push on to the Bolshevik village. The attack on the village was disorganized and resulted in three Marines killed and 18 wounded, including the battalion commander who had ineffectually led the attack himself. A week later, B and C companies, led this time by an army major, made a second attempt to take Koikori, while D company was involved in an attack on the village of Ussuna. The British were again repulsed at Koikori; the army major was killed and both Marine company commanders wounded. D company was also beaten off by Bolshevik forces around Ussuna, with the death of the battalion adjutant, killed by sniper fire.

The next morning, 9 September, faced with the prospect of another attack on the village, one Marine company refused to obey orders and withdrew themselves to a nearby friendly village. As a result, 93 men from the battalion were court-martialled; 13 were sentenced to death and others received substantial sentences of hard labour. In December 1919, the Government, under pressure from several MPs, revoked the sentence of death and considerably reduced the sentences of all the convicted men. (Note: The questions asked in Parliament tell a slightly different story. "Mr. Thomas asked Mr. Long, First Lord of the Admiralty whether he is aware that on 9th September a special battalion of the Royal Marines in Murmansk, after hard fighting for fifteen hours without food, were told by Major Strover, Royal Field Artillery, (Note: Major Martyn Rogers Strover, DSO, was originally a Captain in the Royal Field Artillery but later transferred as a Major to the Royal Garrison Artillery.) to clear out, and, being left with no one in command, they marched to the base for food, and then, in consequence of this, fifty-three men have been sentenced to a term of imprisonment, in most cases of two years, which is being served in His Majesty's Naval Prison, Bodmin; and whether he will have full inquiry made into the matter in order to ascertain whether these men should have the remainder of their sentences quashed? A few days later, Lt-Commander Joseph Kenworthy said: "It seems incredible that ninety-three of these men should be in gaol on a charge of cowardice and insubordination. It is an event unprecedented. Is it a fact that these men were disembarked from the ship and sent on leave with the instruction that they were going to be sent to the Army of the Rhine? Is it a fact that six hours after they had returned from leave, and before they were embarked, they were told that they were being sent to Russia? Is it also a fact that they were sent out there, and although they did not like it, they went? Whether these men actually did refuse to fight or did show any sense of cowardice is very much questioned.")

The Serbs and White Russian forces attacked again on 11 and 14 September, but these attacks also failed. However, the British did manage to reach the Nurmis river by 18 September, with 9,000 troops, including 6,000 White Russians, participating in this final offensive.

On 6 September, the commanding officer of the 2nd Battalion Hampshire Regiment, Lieutenant Colonel Sherwood-Kelly, published an open letter in the Daily Express lambasting the North Russia campaign, stating that the volunteer British troops were being used for offensive actions (despite being told that they wouldn't be) and that the regional White "puppet" government "rested on no basis of public confidence and support". The letter contributed to the British public and soldiers' desire for a withdrawal from North Russia.

== British withdrawal ==
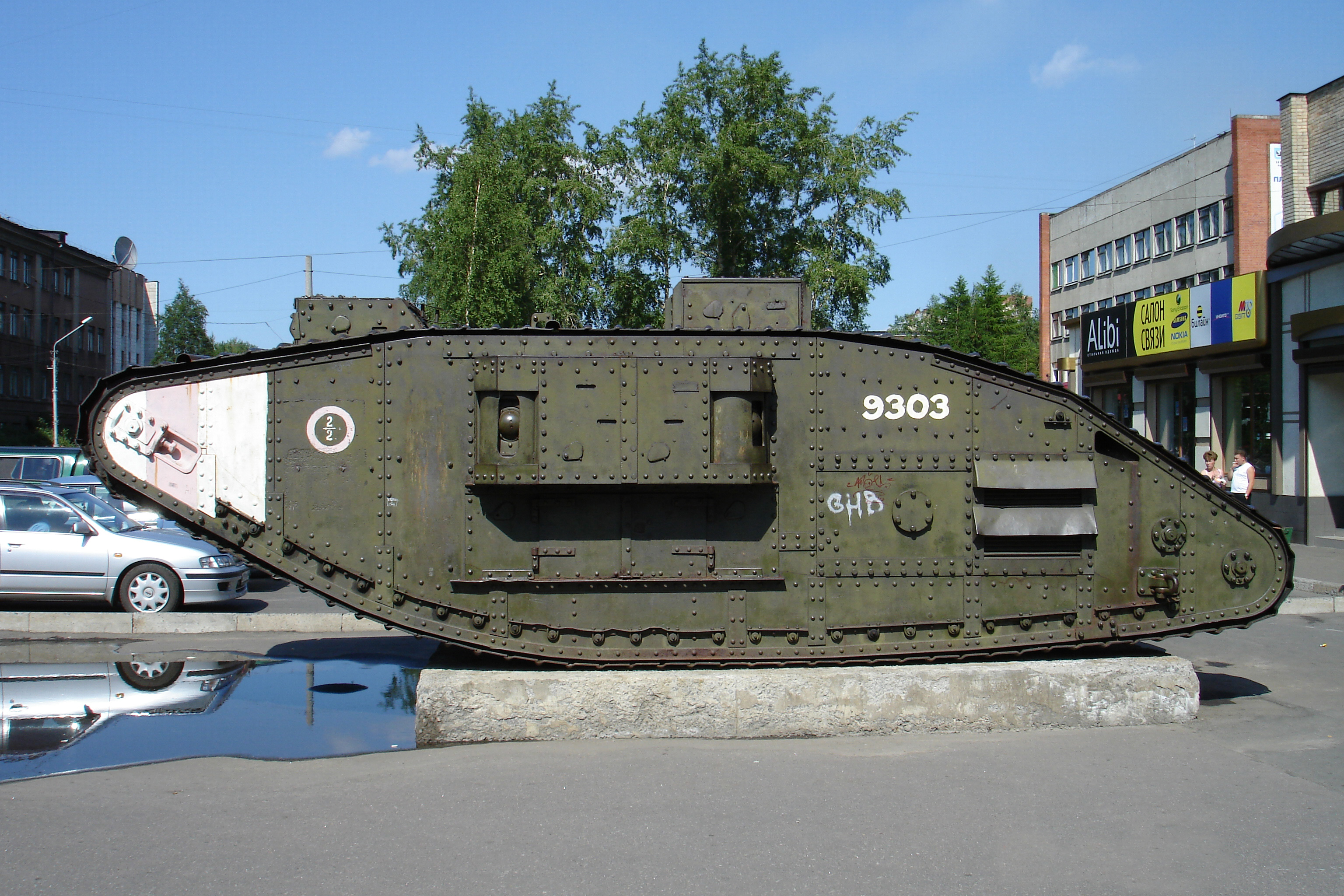
Captured British Mark V tank in Arkhangelsk (2006)

An international policy to support the White Russians and, in newly appointed Secretary of State for War Winston Churchill's words, "to strangle at birth the Bolshevik State" became increasingly unpopular in Britain. In January 1919 the Daily Express was echoing public opinion when, paraphrasing Bismarck, it exclaimed, "the frozen plains of Eastern Europe are not worth the bones of a single grenadier".

From April 1919, the inability to hold the flanks and mutinies in the ranks of the White Russian forces caused the Allied Powers to decide to leave. British officers at Shussuga had a lucky escape when their Russian gunners remained loyal. A number of western military advisers were killed by White mutineers who went over to the Bolsheviks. The Bolsheviks had no intention of allowing the British to leave without a fight, and resumed their attacks on the British positions on 6 September. Fighting took place in the villages of Kodema, Ivanovskaya, Puchega and Chudinova, where 81 Bolsheviks were killed and 99 taken prisoner. In total, 163 Bolsheviks were killed in their offensive compared to one fatality on the side of the British. Over the next week, the Bolsheviks continued attacking the British lines and moved forward very quickly, and there were clashes at Pless and Shushunga. The attackers were subsequently identified as a combined force of civilian partisans and deserters who had mutinied and gone over to the Bolsheviks from the British lines on 7 July. By this point, British troops had started withdrawing to Arkhangelsk in order to prepare themselves for the evacuation of North Russia.

The British War Office sent General Henry Rawlinson to North Russia to assume command of the evacuation out of both Arkhangelsk and Murmansk. General Rawlinson arrived on August 11.

During September, a couple of Bolshevik assaults were launched on Bolshie Ozerki, and although the first was repelled, 750 Red troops advanced on the village on 15 September and attacked from all sides, inflicting heavy casualties on the British and Allied defenders. On 22 September, with the Allied withdrawal already ongoing, a British detachment from the Royal Scots was sent by river to Kandalaksha on four fishing boats to stop sabotage operations carried out by Finnish Bolsheviks against the railway there. The British party was ambushed even before landing and suffered heavy casualties, with 13 men killed and 4 wounded. Consequently, the unopposed Bolsheviks destroyed a number of bridges, delaying the evacuation for a time. One of the fatalities, a private from Ormesby, Yorkshire, who died of his injuries on 26 September, was the last British servicemen to die in action in Northern Russia.

On the morning of September 27, 1919, the last Allied troops departed from Arkhangelsk, and on October 12, Murmansk was abandoned.

== Arkhangelsk Railway and withdrawal of US troops ==
Minor operations to keep open a line of withdrawal against the 7th Red Army as far south as Lake Onega and Yomtsa River to the east took place along the Arkhangelsk Railway with an armoured train manned by the Americans. The last major battle fought by the Americans before their departure took place at Bolshie Ozerki from 31 March through 4 April 1919.

The US appointed Brigadier General Wilds P. Richardson as commander of US forces to organize the safe withdrawal from Arkhangelsk. Richardson and his staff arrived in Arkhangelsk on April 17, 1919. By the end of June, the majority of the US forces was heading home and by September 1919, the last US soldier of the Expedition had also left Northern Russia.

== Aftermath ==
The White Russian Northern Army was left to face the Red Army alone. Poorly disciplined, they were no match for the Red Army, and quickly collapsed when the Bolsheviks launched a counter-offensive in December 1919.

Many soldiers capitulated and the remnants of the Army were evacuated from Arkhangelsk in February 1920. On February 21, 1920, the Bolsheviks entered Arkhangelsk and on March 13, 1920, they took Murmansk. The White Northern Region Government ceased to exist. White Northern Russian commander Yevgeny Miller held out to the end, fleeing with a number of other White officers – including Grigory Chaplin – in an icebreaker when the Reds entered Arkhangelsk. They fled to France, and Miller was later captured by the Bolsheviks and executed in 1939.

== Legacy ==
In 1927, the Constructivist-styled Monument to the Victims of the Intervention was raised in Murmansk, on the tenth anniversary of the Russian Revolution. It is still standing as of 2026.

While the intervention has been mostly forgotten in the west, it is still taught in history lessons in Russian schools and universities as proof of western hostility towards Russia.

== The campaign in fiction ==
Two fictional television characters fought with the British Expeditionary Force: Jack Ford in When the Boat Comes In (as an intelligence officer in Murmansk) and Albert Steptoe in Steptoe and Son.

The campaign features in the Alexander Fullerton novels Look to the Wolves and Bloody Sunset.

The 1990 film Archangel is a surrealistic drama set in 1919 Arkhangelsk during the war.

In John Lawton's novel, Then We Take Berlin (2013), Countess Rada Lyubova mentions (from the novel's present in post-World War II Britain) that she "had turned back at the British lines near Archangel ... 'such folly'" and "had crossed Siberia with the remnants of the Czech Legion ... 'not many ever saw home again.'"

== See also ==
- List of states and regions involved in the Russian Civil War
- Bibliography of the Russian Revolution and Civil War
- Outline of the Russian Revolution and Civil War
- American Expeditionary Force Siberia
- Aunus expedition
- Australian contribution to the Allied Intervention in Russia 1918–1919
- British campaign in the Baltic (1918–1919)
- Estonian War of Independence
- Murmansk Legion
- Siberian intervention
- Southern Russia intervention
- Viena expedition

== Bibliography ==
- Balbirnie, Steven (2 July 2016). "'A Bad Business': British Responses to Mutinies Among Local Forces in Northern Russia". Revolutionary Russia. 29 (2): 129–148. doi:10.1080/09546545.2016.1243613. ISSN 0954-6545. S2CID 152050937.
- Bowyer, Chaz (1988). RAF Operations 1918–1938. London: William Kimber. ISBN 978-0-71-830671-7.
- Brander, A. Michael (1976). Famous Regiments Series: The Royal Scots (The Royal Regiment). London: Leo Cooper. ISBN 978-0-85-052183-2.
- Davis, Donald; Trani, Eugene (2002). The First Cold War: The Legacy of Woodrow Wilson in U.S.–Soviet Relations. University of Missouri Press. ISBN 978-0-82-621388-4.
- Foglesong, David S. (2014). "Fighting but Not At War". America's Secret War Against Bolshevism: U.S. Intervention in the Russian Civil War 1917–1920. Chapel Hill: The University of North Carolina Press. pp. 208–254. ISBN 978-1-46-961113-6.
- Grey, Jeffery (1999). A Military History of Australia (2nd ed.). Cambridge: Cambridge University Press. ISBN 978-0-52-164483-9.
- Hare, Paul R. (1990). The Royal Aircraft Factory. London: Putnam. ISBN 0-85177-843-7.
- House, John M.; Curzon, Daniel P. M. (2019). The Russian Expeditions 1917–1920. U.S. Army campaigns of World War I, (No. 77-10) (1st ed.). Washington, D.C.: Center of Military History, United States Army. OCLC 1127909938.
- Kinvig, Clifford (2006). Churchill's Crusade: The British Invasion of Russia 1918–1920. London: Hambledon Continuum. ISBN 1-85285-477-4.
- Mawdsley, Evan (2007). The Russian Civil War. Pegasus Books. ISBN 978-1-933648-15-6.
- Millman, Brock (1998). "The Problem with Generals: Military Observers and the Origins of the Intervention in Russia and Persia, 1917-18". Journal of Contemporary History. 33 (2): 291–320. doi:10.1177/002200949803300207. S2CID 154104534 – via Sage Publications.
- Munt, Franck, ed. (2015) [1921]. Historique sommaire du 2e régiment d'artillerie coloniale pendant la campagne de 1914–1918 (PDF) (in French) (facs. repr. tableaudhonneur.free.fr ed.). Rennes: Impr. Oberthïr. OCLC 829611823.
- Paasilinna, Erno (1980). Kaukana maailmasta: historiaa ja muistoja Petsamosta [Far from the world: history and memories of Petsamo] (in Finnish). Helsinki: Otava. ISBN 951-10604-2-2.
- Swettenham, John (1967). Allied Intervention in Russia 1918-1919 and the Part Played by Canada. Toronto: The Ryerson Press.
- Willett Jr., Robert L. (2005). Russian Sideshow: America's Undeclared War, 1918–1920. Potomac Books. ISBN 1-57488-706-8.
- Williamson, Howard J. (2018). The Military Medal Awarded to The Allied Armies by The British Government. privately published by Anne Williamson. ISBN 978-1-99-967271-3.
- Wright, Damien (2017). Churchill's Secret War with Lenin: British and Commonwealth Military Intervention in the Russian Civil War, 1918–20. Solihull: Helion. ISBN 978-1-911512-10-3.
