= Lake Kuorevesi =

Kuorevesi
- Location within Finland
- Location: Mänttä-Vilppula, Jämsä
- Coordinates: 61.96567°N 24.70070°E
- Type: Lake
- Primary inflows: Keurusselkä
- Primary outflows: Lake Ruovesi
- Catchment area: 2,027 km^{2} (783 sq mi)
- Basin countries: Finland
- Surface area: 23.805 km^{2} (9.191 sq mi)
- Average depth: 6.17 m (20.2 ft)
- Max. depth: 46.3 m (152 ft)
- Water volume: 0.147 km^{3} (119,000 acre⋅ft)
- Shore length^{1}: 172.32 km (107.07 mi)
- Surface elevation: 98.9 m (324 ft)
- Frozen: December–April
- Islands: Kuoresalo, Kurransaari
- Settlements: Mänttä, Vilppula
- ^{1} Shore length is not a well-defined measure.

Lake Kuorevesi (Finnish: Kuorevesi) is a medium-sized lake in Finland. It is situated in the municipalities of Mänttä-Vilppula and Jämsä (formerly Kuorevesi) in the Central Finland region. The lake is part of the Kokemäenjoki basin.

The lake's main inflow is lake Keurusselkä, which drains into Kuorevesi from the north. Kuorevesi in turn drains into the Lake Ruovesi in the west.

== See also ==
- List of lakes in Finland
