= Ruovesi =

- Municipality
- Ruoveden kunta Ruovesi kommun
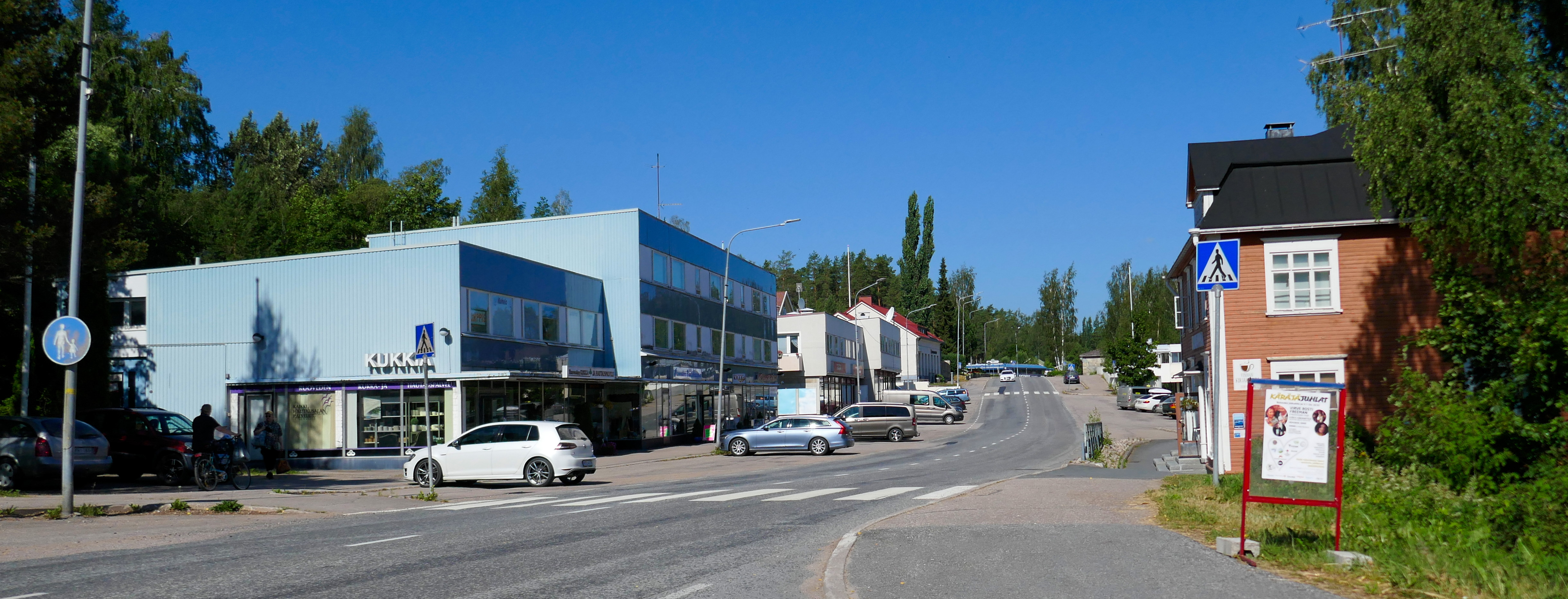
- Central Ruovesi

- Coat of arms

- Location of Ruovesi in Finland
- Interactive map of Ruovesi
- Coordinates: 61°59′N 024°04′E
- Country: Finland
- Region: Pirkanmaa
- Sub-region: Upper Pirkanmaa
- Charter: 1565

Government
  - Municipal manager: Toni Leppänen

Area (2018-01-01)
  - Total: 950.16 km^{2} (366.86 sq mi)
  - Land: 776.99 km^{2} (300.00 sq mi)
  - Water: 173.97 km^{2} (67.17 sq mi)
  - Rank: 108th largest in Finland

Population (2025-12-31)
  - Total: 3,995
  - Rank: 190th largest in Finland
  - Density: 5.14/km^{2} (13.3/sq mi)

Population by native language
  - Finnish: 95.9% (official)
  - Swedish: 0.3%
  - Others: 3.8%

Population by age
  - 0 to 14: 11%
  - 15 to 64: 51.2%
  - 65 or older: 37.8%
- Time zone: UTC+02:00 (EET)
  - Summer (DST): UTC+03:00 (EEST)
- Website: www.ruovesi.fi/for-tourists

Ruovesi is a municipality in the Pirkanmaa region of Finland. The municipality has a population of 3,995 (31 December 2025) and covers an area of 950.16 square kilometres (366.86 sq mi) of which 173.97 km^{2} (67.17 sq mi) is water. The population density is 5.14 inhabitants per square kilometre (13.3/sq mi).

Neighbouring municipalities are Juupajoki, Mänttä-Vilppula, Orivesi, Tampere, Virrat and Ylöjärvi.

The municipality is unilingually Finnish.

Helvetinjärvi National Park is located in Ruovesi. The biggest lake in the area of the municipality, Lake Ruovesi, is a part of the Kokemäki River basin. The educational department takes part in Lifelong Learning Programme 2007–2013 in Finland.

== History ==
The municipality of Ruovesi is named after the eponymous lake, whose name may have originally been *Ruokovesi, derived from the word ruoko meaning 'reed'. The parish of Ruovesi was separated from Pirkkala in 1565, and included the territories of later Ähtäri, Keuruu, Kuru, Mänttä, Multia, Pihlajavesi, Pohjaslahti, Vilppula and Virrat at that time.

== Population ==
On 31 December 2023, there were 4,124 people living in Ruovesi, of whom 2,032 lived in urban areas (taajama), 2,048 lived outside them and 44 lived in an unknown location.

At the time, there were two urban areas in the municipality: Ruoveden kirkonkylä (administrative center; 1,765) and Visuvesi (267).

== People born in Ruovesi ==
- Väinö Nyström (1857 – 1918)
- Verner Järvinen (1870 – 1941)
- Kalle Häkkinen (1878 – 1919)
- Akseli Anttila (1897 – 1953)
- Jorma Gallen-Kallela (1898 – 1939)
- Eila Eskola-Kyröläinen (1931 – 2015)
- Kimmo Latvamäki (1976 – )

== Gallery ==
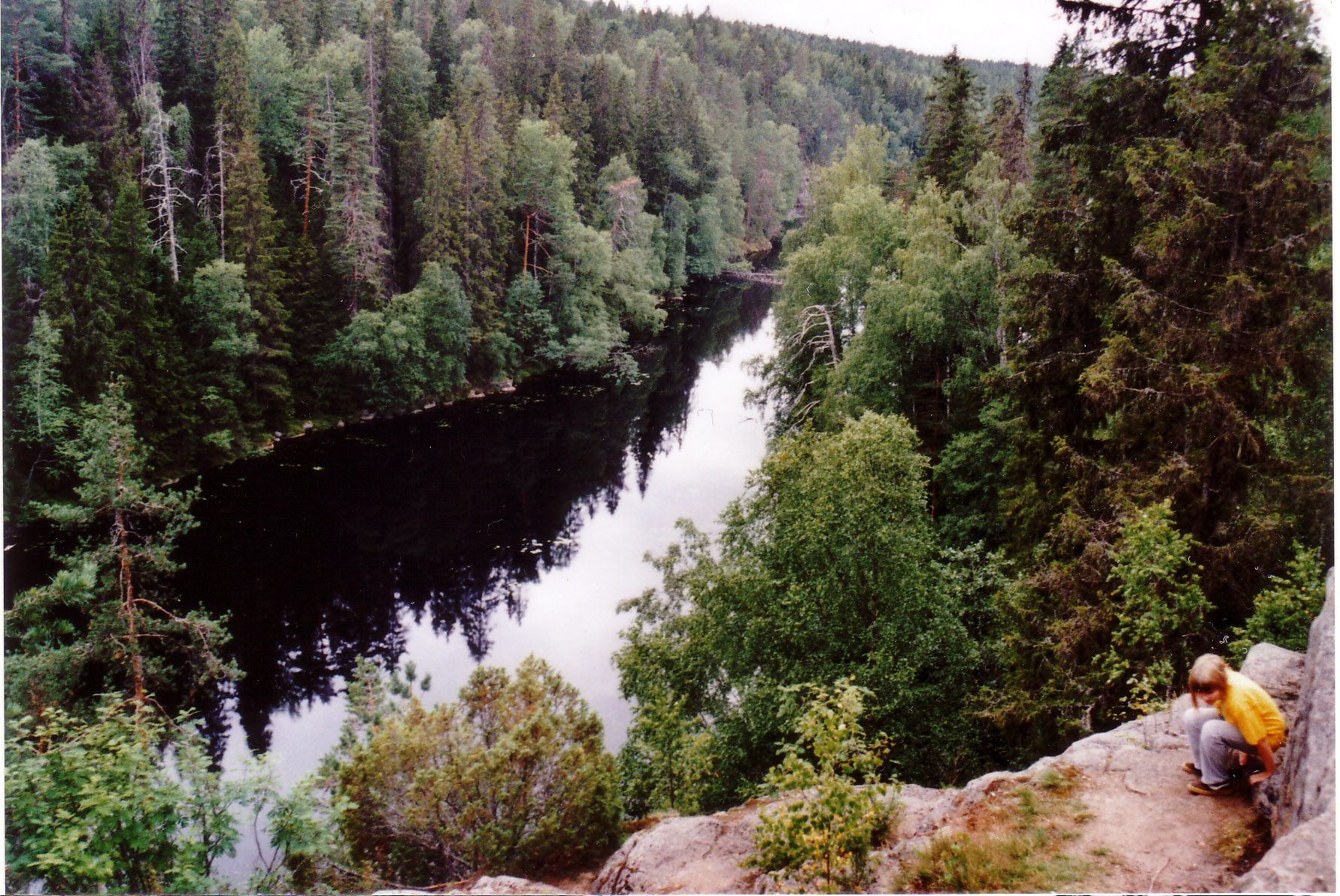
Helvetinjärvi National Park

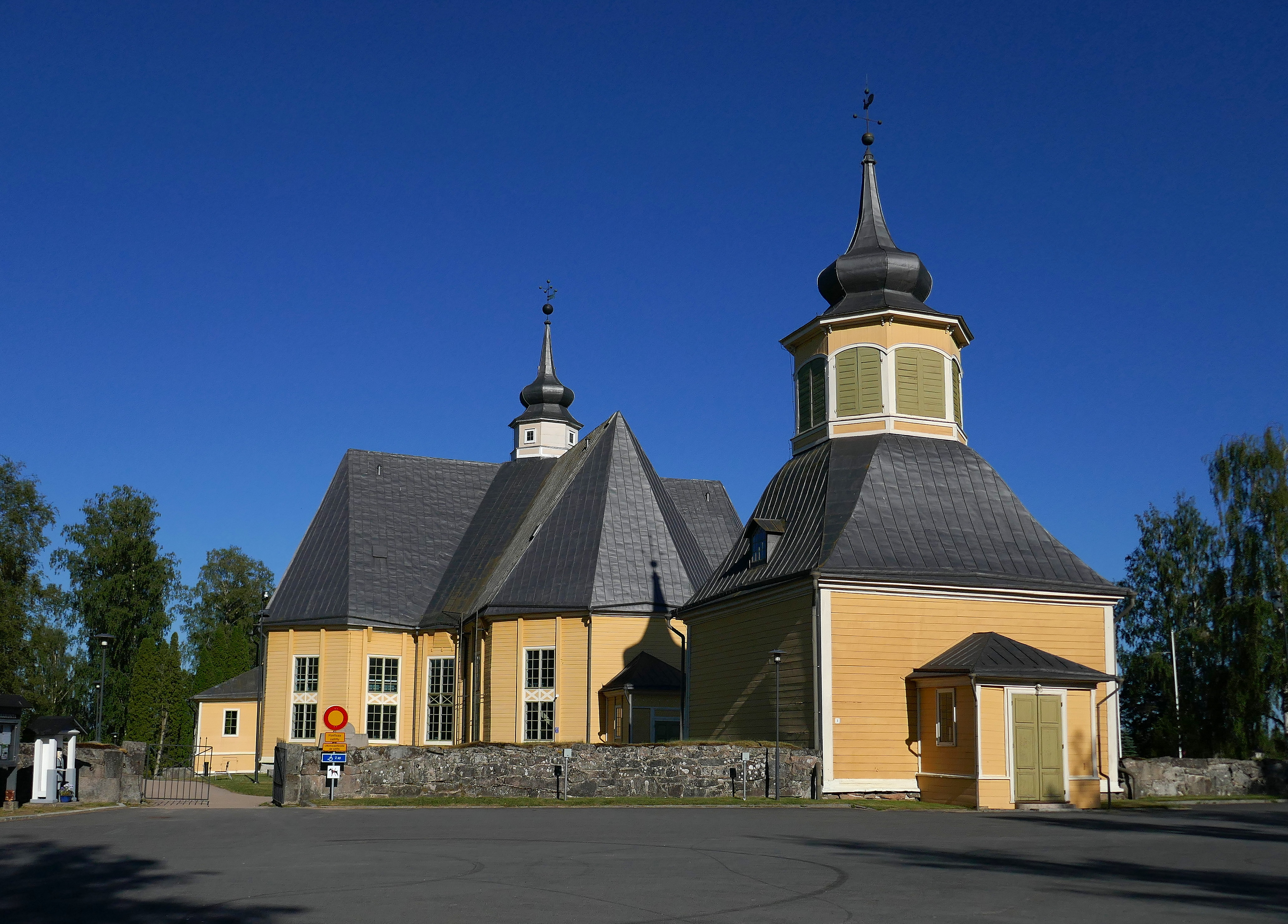
Ruovesi Church

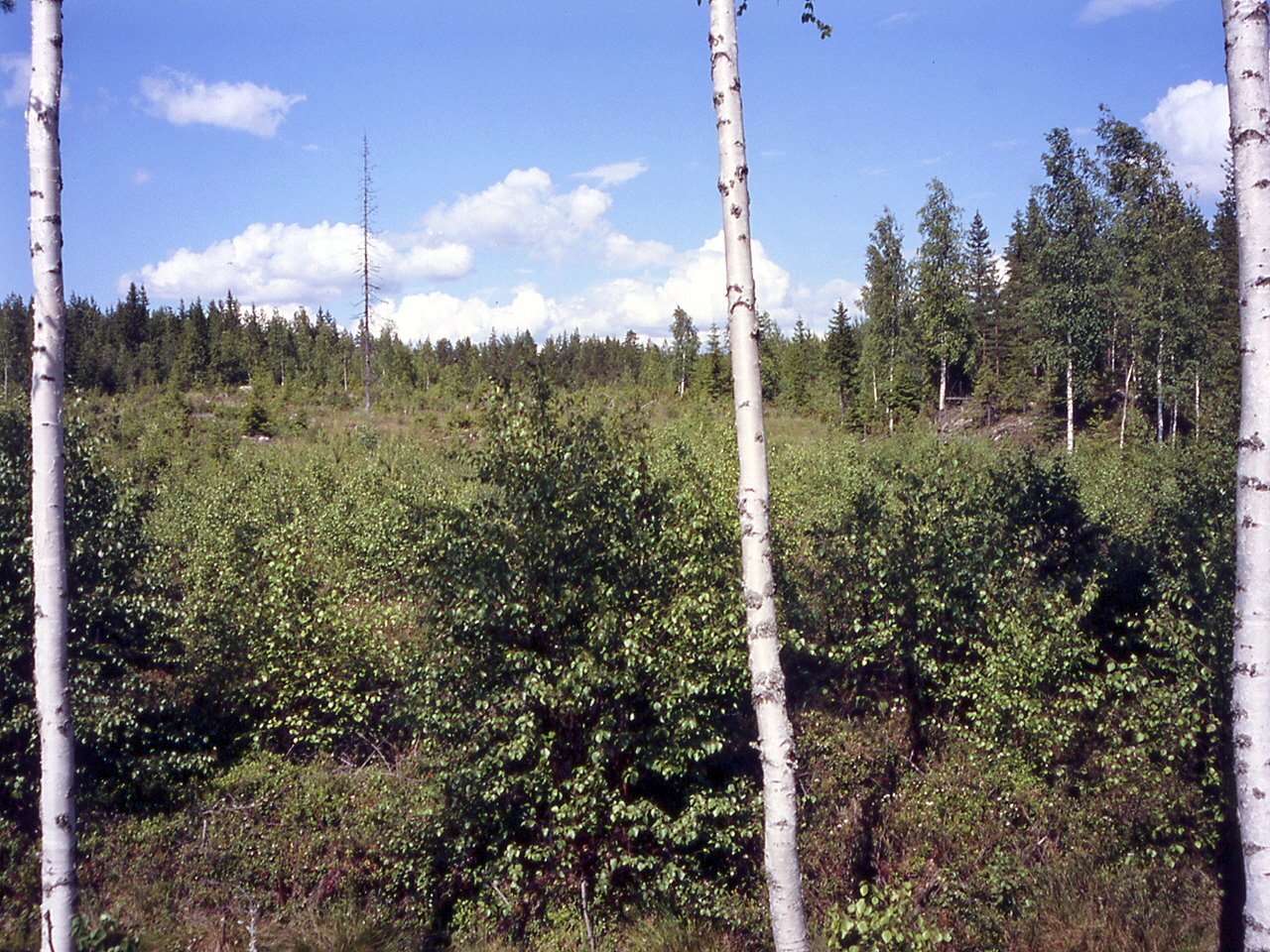
Birches near Ruovesi
