= Mänttä-Vilppula =

- Town
- Mänttä-Vilppulan kaupunki Mänttä-Vilppula stad
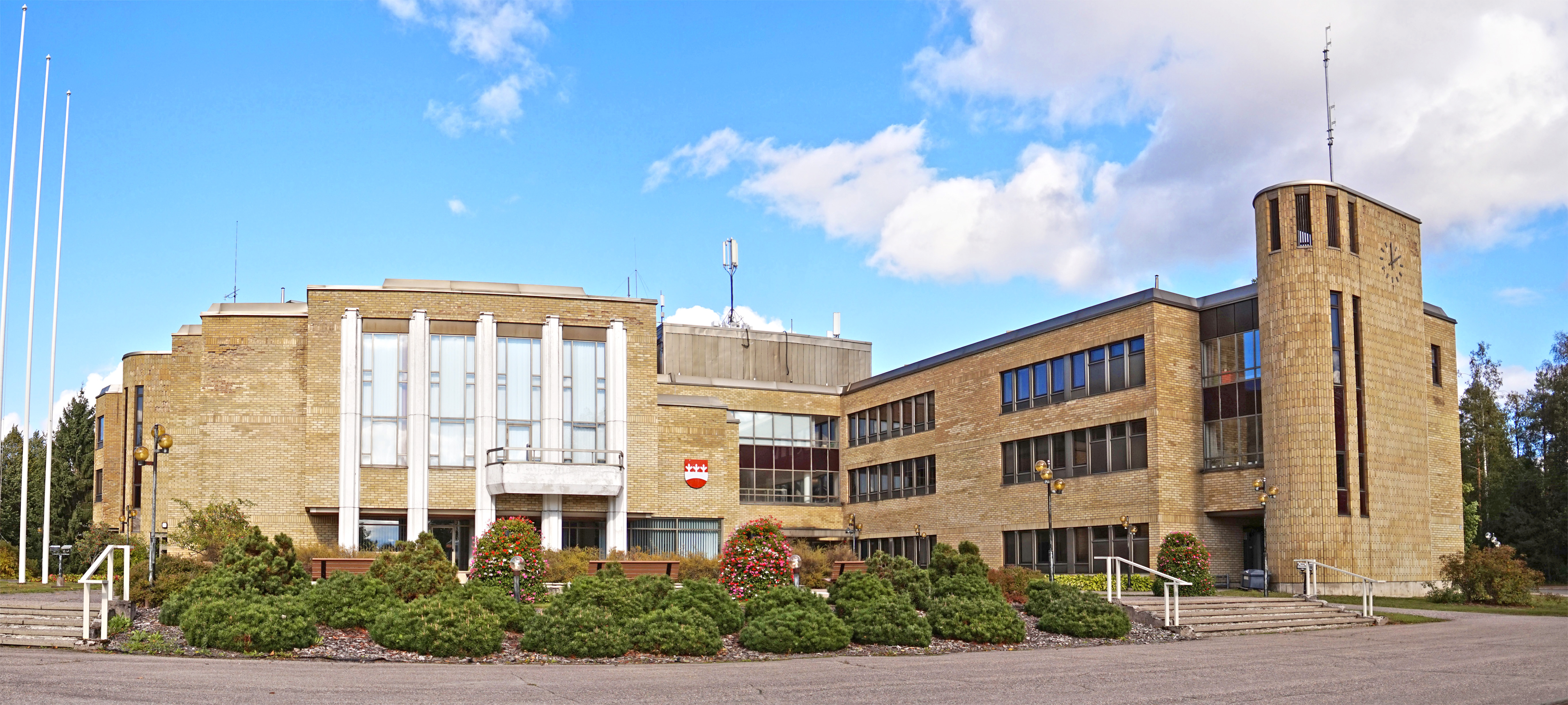
- Mänttä-Vilppula town hall in Mänttä

- Coat of arms

- Location of Mänttä-Vilppula in Finland
- Interactive map of Mänttä-Vilppula
- Coordinates: 62°02′N 024°37′E
- Country: Finland
- Region: Pirkanmaa
- Sub-region: Upper Pirkanmaa
- Charter: 2009
- Seat: Mänttä
- Villages: Vilppula, Pohjaslahti, Kolho

Government
  - Town manager: Anne Heusala

Area (2018-01-01)
  - Total: 657.08 km^{2} (253.70 sq mi)
  - Land: 534.81 km^{2} (206.49 sq mi)
  - Water: 122.61 km^{2} (47.34 sq mi)
  - Rank: 162nd largest in Finland

Population (2025-12-31)
  - Total: 9,109
  - Rank: 104th largest in Finland
  - Density: 17.03/km^{2} (44.1/sq mi)

Population by native language
  - Finnish: 94.6% (official)
  - Swedish: 0.2%
  - Others: 5.2%

Population by age
  - 0 to 14: 11.5%
  - 15 to 64: 52.8%
  - 65 or older: 35.7%
- Time zone: UTC+02:00 (EET)
  - Summer (DST): UTC+03:00 (EEST)
- Website: www.manttavilppula.fi

Mänttä-Vilppula (Finnish: [ˈmæntːæˌʋilpːulɑ]; Swedish: Mänttä-Vilppula, also Mänttä-Filpula) is a town and municipality of Finland. The municipalities of Mänttä and Vilppula were consolidated into a single municipality on January 1, 2009. It is located in the Pirkanmaa region.

The town has a population of 9,109 (31 December 2025) and covers an area of 657.08 square kilometres (253.70 sq mi) of which 122.61 km^{2} (47.34 sq mi) is water. Major lakes in the area include the Ruovesi, Kuorevesi and Keurusselkä. The municipality is unilingually Finnish.

Neighbouring municipalities are Keuruu, Juupajoki, Jämsä, Ruovesi and Virrat. The city of Tampere is located 97 kilometres (60 mi) southwest of the center of Mänttä-Vilppula.

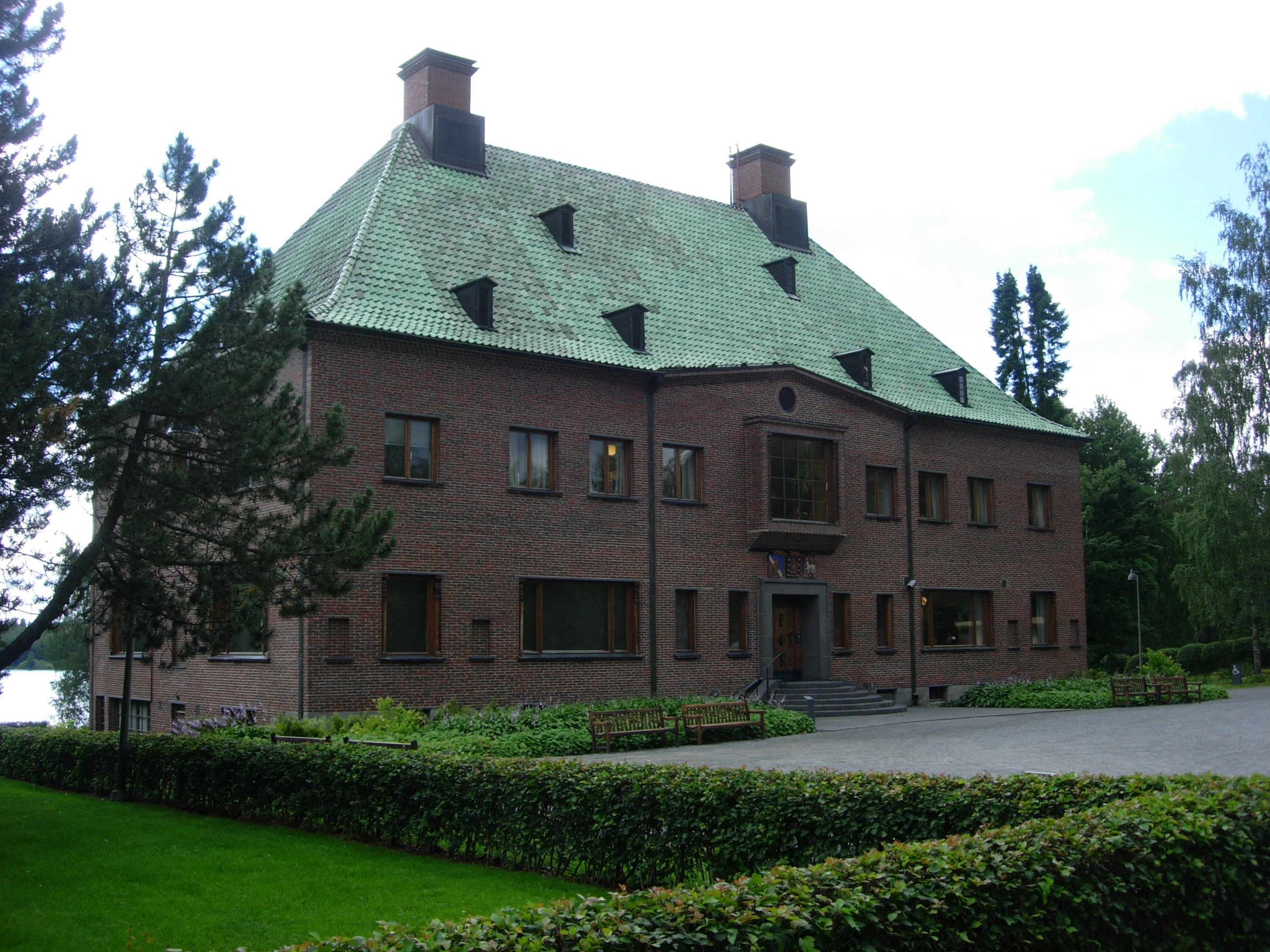
The Serlachius Art Museum

Culturally, Mänttä-Vilppula is known, among other things, for the Serlachius Museum situated in the Mänttä area, which houses the art collection collected by Vuorineuvos Gösta Serlachius (1876–1942). Also, the Mänttä Art Festival is held annually in the summer.

== Notable people ==
- Eero Rahola (1897–1975)
- Lydia Wideman (1920-2019)
- Veikko Ennala (1922–1991)
- Marjatta Moulin (1926–2018)
- Keijo Liinamaa (1929–1980)
- Risto Siltanen (born 1958)
- Laura Huhtasaari (born 1979)
- Emmi (Finnish singer) (born 1979)
- Pekka Koskela (born 1982)
- Miikka "Lord Satanachia" Ojala (Finnish black metal vocalist) (born 1974)

== See also ==
- Vilppula railway station
- Finnish national road 58
- Serlachius-museo Gustaf
