= Pohjaslahti =

- Former municipality
- Pohjaslahden kunta
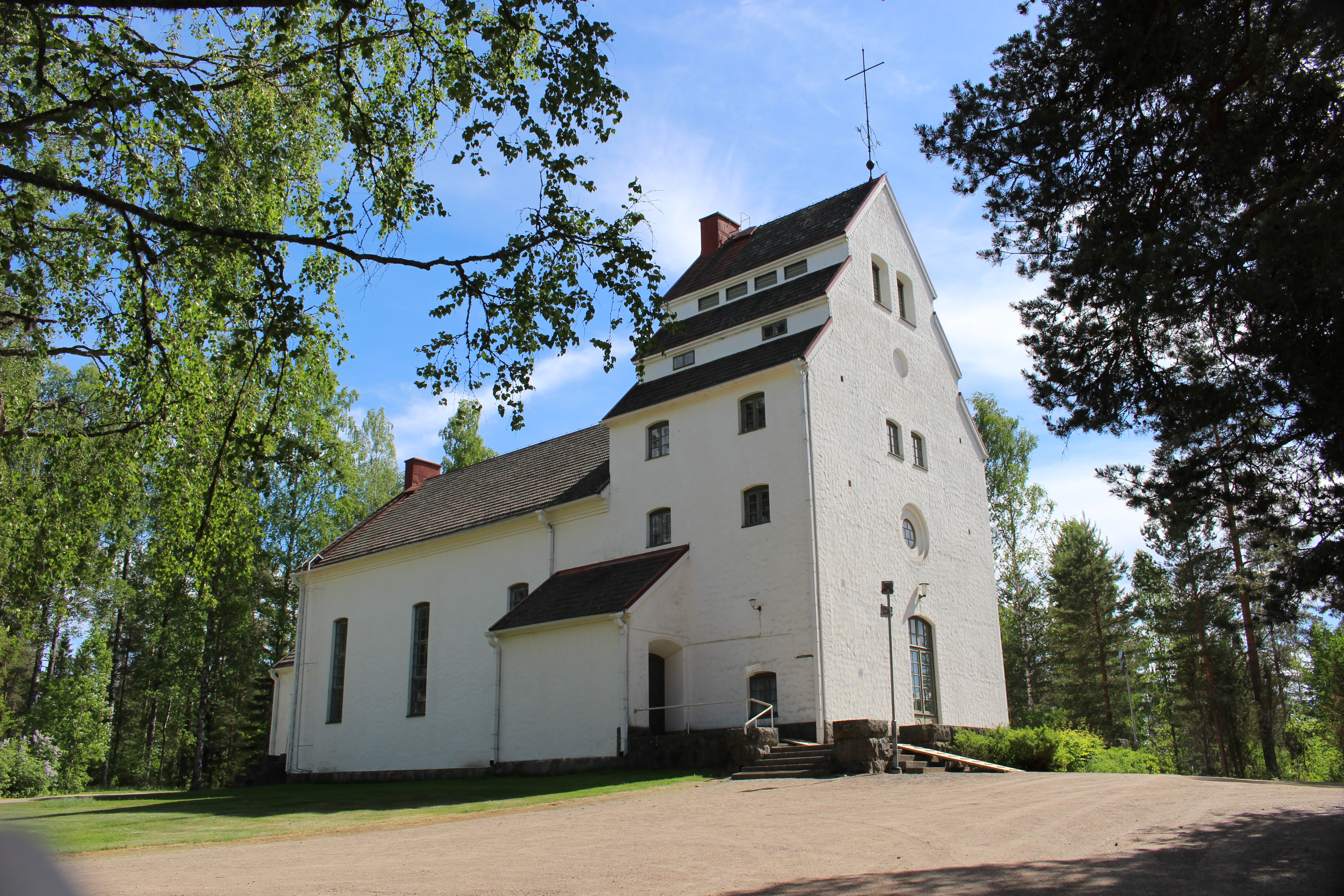
- Pohjaslahti Church.

- Coat of arms

- Location of Pohjaslahti in Finland
- Coordinates: 62.1539741°N 24.1322056°E
- Country: Finland
- Province: Häme Province
- Region: Pirkanmaa
- Established: 1941
- Merged into Vilppula and Virrat: 1973
- Seat: Pohjaslahti

Area
  - Land: 174.6 km^{2} (67.4 sq mi)

Population (1972-12-31)
  - Total: 1,006

Pohjaslahti is a village and former municipality of Finland at the time of its existence in the Häme Province, now in the Pirkanmaa region. It was divided between Vilppula and Virrat in 1973. Pohjaslahti was the last rural municipality to be created in Finland, which happened in 1941.

It bordered Vilppula, Ruovesi, Virrat and Keuruu. It also bordered Pihlajavesi until 1969, when it was merged into Keuruu.

== History ==
Pohjaslahti has existed at least since 1564, when it was mentioned as Pohialaxi. A farm named Pohjaslahti was established earlier in the 16th century. At the time, it was a part of Ruovesi, which was separated from Pirkkala in 1565. Ruovesi was mainly settled by Tavastians and the dialects of Ruovesi and Pohjaslahti are Tavastian dialects. Some settlers in the area were Savonians, whose influence can still be seen in the local dialect, e.g. the usage of the extra loi-syllable in plural nouns (for example ristejä may be pronounced as ristilöitä).

Pohjaslahti became a separate parish in 1927 and a municipality in 1941. It was the last new rural municipality to be created in Finland, however some towns and kauppalas were still created afterwards.

The church, designed by Kauno Kallio, was opened in 1932. The altarpiece was painted by Urho Lehtinen.

The municipality was divided between Vilppula and Virrat in 1973. Most of the municipality, including the village of Pohjaslahti itself, was given to Vilppula. Out of the 1006 residents there on the last day of the municipality's existence, 841 lived on the lands transferred to Vilppula and 165 on the lands transferred to Virrat. Vilppula merged with Mänttä in 2009 to form Mänttä-Vilppula.

== Services ==
Pohjaslahti has a library and a small daycare center.

=== Education ===
Pohjaslahti had a school for grades 1-6 until 2014. Nowadays, the children attend school in Vilppula and Kotala. The school grounds have been used for various events since 2018.

== Sights ==
An old mill by the Kangaskoski rapids acts as a small museum.
