= Vilppula railway station =

Railway station in Mänttä-Vilppula, Finland

Vilppula
- Vilppula railway station in 2019.

General information
- Location: Keskuskatu 21, 35700; Vilppula, Mänttä-Vilppula; Finland
- Coordinates: 62°01′33″N 024°30′26″E
- System: VR station
- Owner: Finnish Transport Infrastructure Agency
- Operator: VR Group
- Line: Tampere–Haapamäki
- Platforms: 1 side platform

Construction
- Structure type: Ground station
- Architect: Knut Nylander (extension by Bruno Granholm)

Other information
- Station code: Vlp
- Classification: Operating point

History
- Opened: 29 September 1897
- Former names: Filppula (until May 1897)

Passengers
- 2008: 32,000

Services
Preceding station	VR Group	Following station
Orivesi Central towards Tampere	Tampere–Haapamäki	Kolho towards Haapamäki
Location
- Location within Pirkanmaa Location within Finland

The Vilppula railway station (Finnish: Vilppulan rautatieasema, Swedish: Vilppula järnvägsstation, Filppula until May 1897) is located in the town of Mänttä-Vilppula, Finland, in the district and former municipality of Vilppula. It is located along the Tampere–Haapamäki railway, and its neighboring stations are Kolho in the north and Orivesi Central in the south.

== Services ==
All regional trains on the route Tampere–Haapamäki–Keuruu–Jyväskylä stop at Vilppula; the default type of rolling stock for this route is the Dm12 railbus. All services arrive to and depart from track 1.
