= Lake Ruovesi =

Lake in Finland

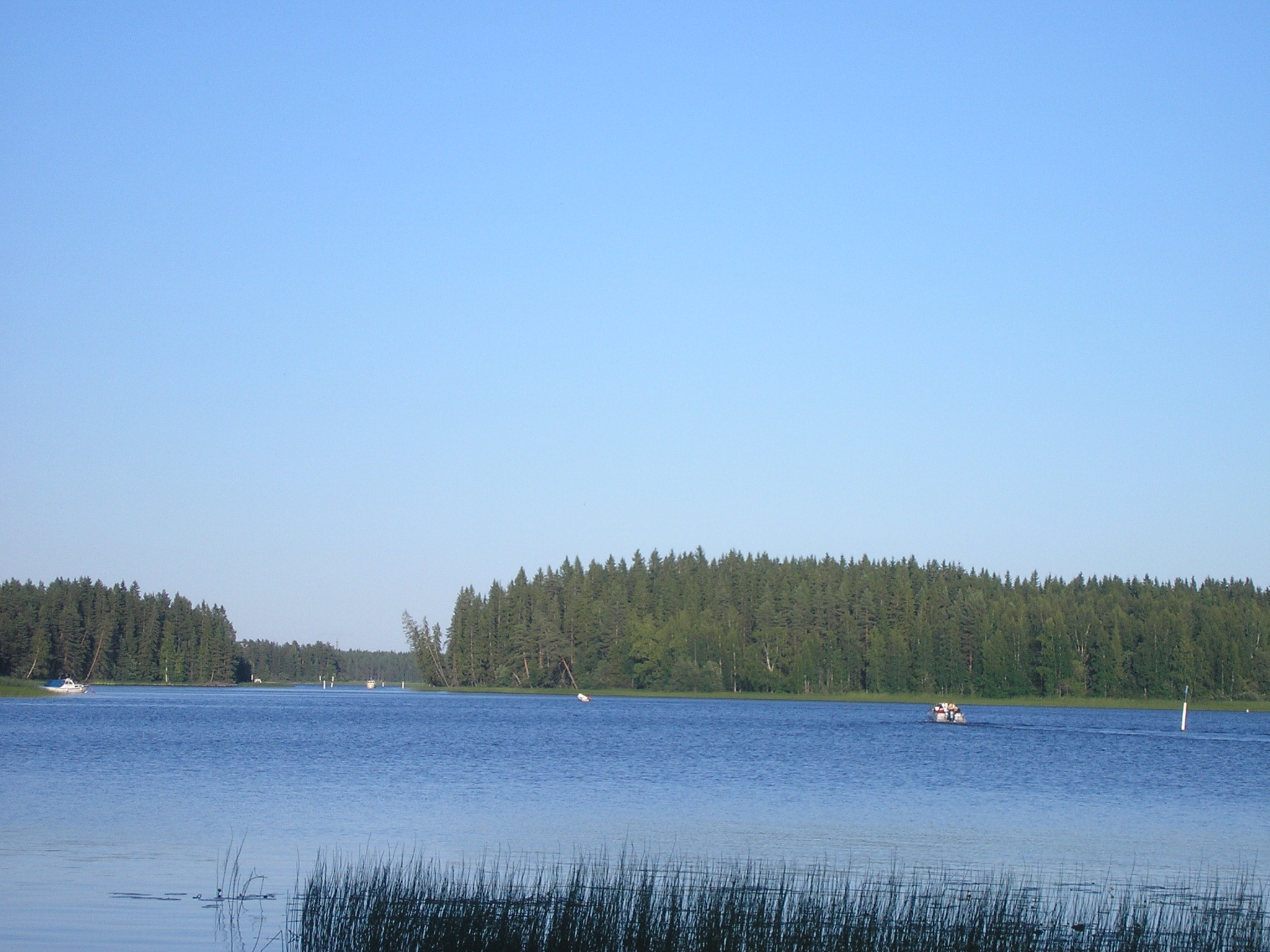

- Location within Finland
- Location: Ruovesi, Mänttä-Vilppula
- Coordinates: 61°59′N 24°07′E
- Primary inflows: Tarjanne, Lake Kuorevesi
- Primary outflows: Palovesi
- Catchment area: Kokemäenjoki
- Basin countries: Finland
- Surface area: 32.107 km^{2} (12.397 sq mi)
- Max. depth: 46.55 m (152.7 ft)
- Shore length^{1}: 319.12 km (198.29 mi)
- Surface elevation: 96.1 m (315 ft)
- Frozen: December–April
- Islands: Lehtissaari, Sotkansaari
- Settlements: Ruovesi, Vilppula
- ^{1} Shore length is not a well-defined measure.

Lake Ruovesi is a medium-sized lake in Central Finland. It is situated in the municipalities of Ruovesi and Mänttä-Vilppula in the Pirkanmaa region in western Finland. Besides the municipality, a local newspaper published in that municipality is also named Ruovesi.

The lake is a part of the Kokemäki River basin and its main inflows are the Lake Tarjanne in north and the Lake Kuorevesi in the east. The lake drains into the lake Palovesi in south, which in its turn drains into the lake Näsijärvi.

== See also ==
- List of lakes in Finland
