= Väinö Nyström =

Aleksander Väinö Nyström (11 September 1857 – 31 January 1918) was a Finnish civil servant, bank director and politician, born in Ruovesi. He was a member of the Parliament of Finland from 1909 to 1910, representing the Finnish Party. A few days after the beginning of the Finnish Civil War, being a prominent supporter of the White faction, he was arrested by Red Guards and shot in Pirkkala on 31 January 1918.
