= Virrat =

Town in southwest Finland

Virrat Virdois
- Town
- Virtain kaupunki Virdois stad
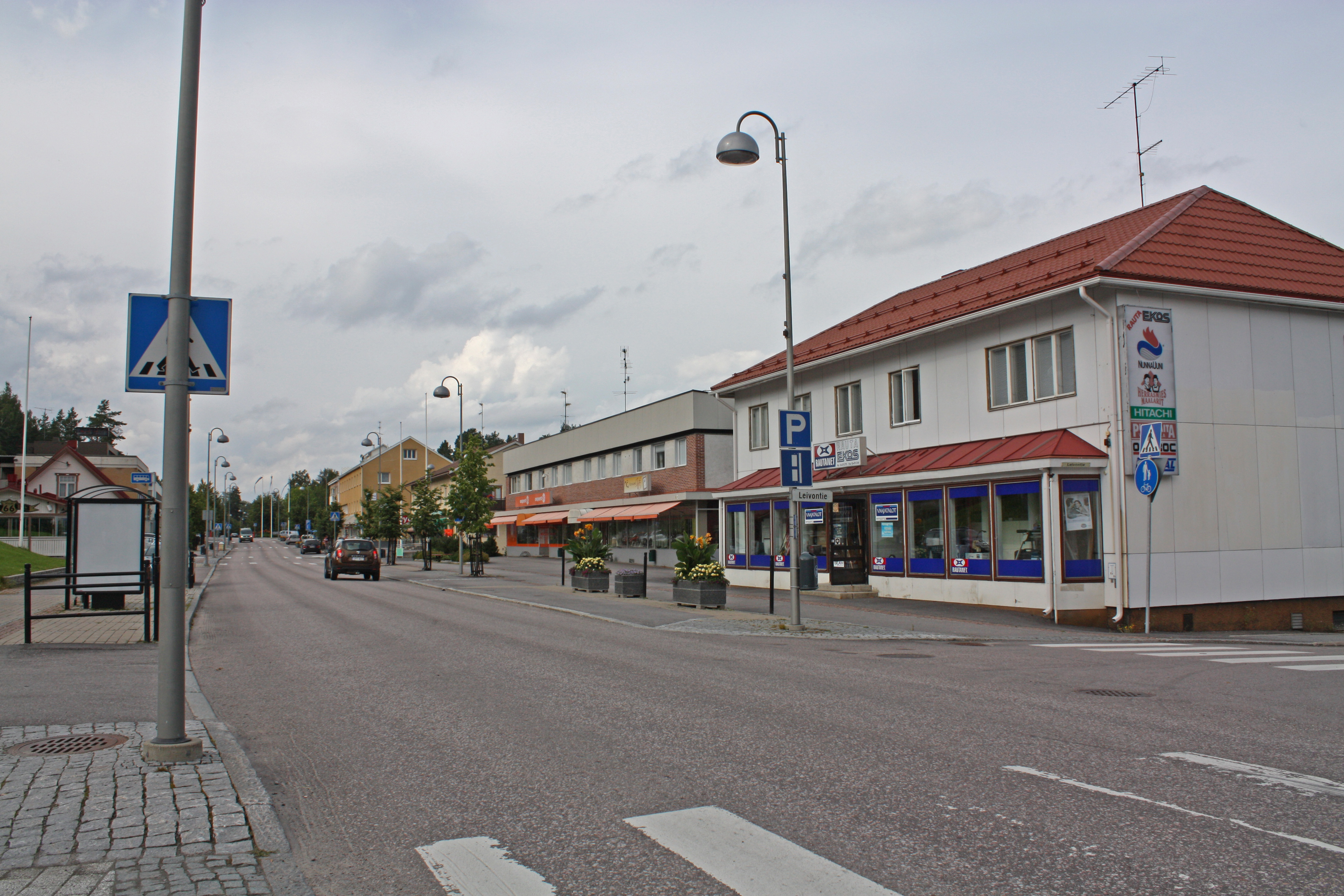
- An intersection of Virtaintie and Leivontie streets in Virrat

- Coat of arms

- Location of Virrat in Finland
- Interactive map of Virrat
- Coordinates: 62°15′N 023°46′E
- Country: Finland
- Region: Pirkanmaa
- Sub-region: Upper Pirkanmaa
- Charter: 1868

Government
  - Town manager: Henna Viitanen

Area (2018-01-01)
  - Total: 1,299.07 km^{2} (501.57 sq mi)
  - Land: 1,162.63 km^{2} (448.89 sq mi)
  - Water: 136.73 km^{2} (52.79 sq mi)
  - Rank: 63rd largest in Finland

Population (2025-12-31)
  - Total: 6,126
  - Rank: 152nd largest in Finland
  - Density: 5.27/km^{2} (13.6/sq mi)

Population by native language
  - Finnish: 95.2% (official)
  - Others: 4.8%

Population by age
  - 0 to 14: 11.7%
  - 15 to 64: 50.7%
  - 65 or older: 37.6%
- Time zone: UTC+02:00 (EET)
  - Summer (DST): UTC+03:00 (EEST)
- Website: www.virrat.fi

Virrat (Finnish: [ˈʋirːɑt]; Swedish: Virdois) is a town and municipality of Finland. Part of the Pirkanmaa region, it is located 104 kilometres (65 mi) north of Tampere and 113 kilometres (70 mi) west of Jyväskylä. Virrat is 285 kilometres (177 mi) from Helsinki. The town has a population of 6,126 (31 December 2025) and covers an area of 1,299.07 square kilometres (501.57 sq mi) of which 136.73 km^{2} (52.79 sq mi) is water. The population density is 5.27 inhabitants per square kilometre (13.6/sq mi). The municipality is unilingually Finnish.

The town grew rapidly in the mid-20th century, and by 1950 the population reached more than 12,000. Virrat acquired town status in 1977, although it had received the right to hold markets three years earlier, in 1974. More recently the population level has been adversely impacted by the drift of employment opportunities and people to the larger towns. Apart from the town of Virrat itself, the administratively defined municipality is largely rural, and includes the villages of Äijänneva, Härkönen Jäähdyspohja, Killinkoski, Koro, Kotala, Kurjenkylä, Liedenpohja, Ohtola, Vaskuu, and Vaskivesi.

Major lakes in the area are Lake Toisvesi, beside which the town of Virrat is located, and Lake Tarjanne at the border of the municipalities of Virrat, Mänttä-Vilppula, and Ruovesi.

Virrat crater on Mars is named after it.

== Climate ==
Virrat has a subarctic climate (Dfc). Diurnal air temperature variation is higher than in other parts of Pirkanmaa.

Climate data for Virrat Äijänneva (1991-2020 normals, extremes 1993-present)
Month	Jan	Feb	Mar	Apr	May	Jun	Jul	Aug	Sep	Oct	Nov	Dec	Year
Record high °C (°F)	8.0 (46.4)	8.6 (47.5)	14.8 (58.6)	22.9 (73.2)	28.2 (82.8)	31.0 (87.8)	32.9 (91.2)	30.7 (87.3)	26.6 (79.9)	19.5 (67.1)	13.0 (55.4)	9.4 (48.9)	32.9 (91.2)
Mean maximum °C (°F)	3.5 (38.3)	3.6 (38.5)	8.5 (47.3)	16.7 (62.1)	23.5 (74.3)	26.1 (79.0)	27.3 (81.1)	25.8 (78.4)	20.3 (68.5)	13.2 (55.8)	8.0 (46.4)	4.3 (39.7)	28.4 (83.1)
Mean daily maximum °C (°F)	−3.6 (25.5)	−3.3 (26.1)	1.1 (34.0)	7.9 (46.2)	14.6 (58.3)	18.9 (66.0)	21.6 (70.9)	19.9 (67.8)	14.2 (57.6)	7.0 (44.6)	1.6 (34.9)	−1.7 (28.9)	8.2 (46.8)
Daily mean °C (°F)	−6.5 (20.3)	−6.9 (19.6)	−3.3 (26.1)	2.7 (36.9)	8.8 (47.8)	13.4 (56.1)	16.0 (60.8)	14.1 (57.4)	9.3 (48.7)	3.7 (38.7)	−0.6 (30.9)	−4.0 (24.8)	3.9 (39.0)
Mean daily minimum °C (°F)	−10.3 (13.5)	−11.2 (11.8)	−8.4 (16.9)	−2.2 (28.0)	2.0 (35.6)	6.7 (44.1)	9.7 (49.5)	8.1 (46.6)	4.4 (39.9)	0.8 (33.4)	−2.9 (26.8)	−7.2 (19.0)	−0.9 (30.4)
Mean minimum °C (°F)	−26.9 (−16.4)	−27.4 (−17.3)	−22.7 (−8.9)	−10.7 (12.7)	−5.0 (23.0)	−0.9 (30.4)	2.4 (36.3)	0.5 (32.9)	−4.0 (24.8)	−9.4 (15.1)	−14.0 (6.8)	−20.5 (−4.9)	−30.8 (−23.4)
Record low °C (°F)	−36.2 (−33.2)	−37.5 (−35.5)	−33.7 (−28.7)	−19.6 (−3.3)	−9.0 (15.8)	−5.4 (22.3)	−1.1 (30.0)	−2.4 (27.7)	−7.1 (19.2)	−18.3 (−0.9)	−26.9 (−16.4)	−34.2 (−29.6)	−37.5 (−35.5)
Source 1: https://www.ilmatieteenlaitos.fi/ilmastollinen-vertailukausi
Source 2: https://kilotavu.com/asema-taulukko.php?asema=101310

== Notable people ==
- Seppo Hovinen (born 1951), a Finnish javelin thrower
- I. K. Inha (1865–1930), a Finnish photographer, author, translator, and journalist
- Antti Lieroinen (died 1643), a famous Finnish cunning man and death-sentenced for witchcraft
- Vesa Rantanen (born 1975), a Finnish pole vaulter
- Tom Sukanen (1873–1943), a Finnish-born Canadian sailor and farmer

== Gallery ==
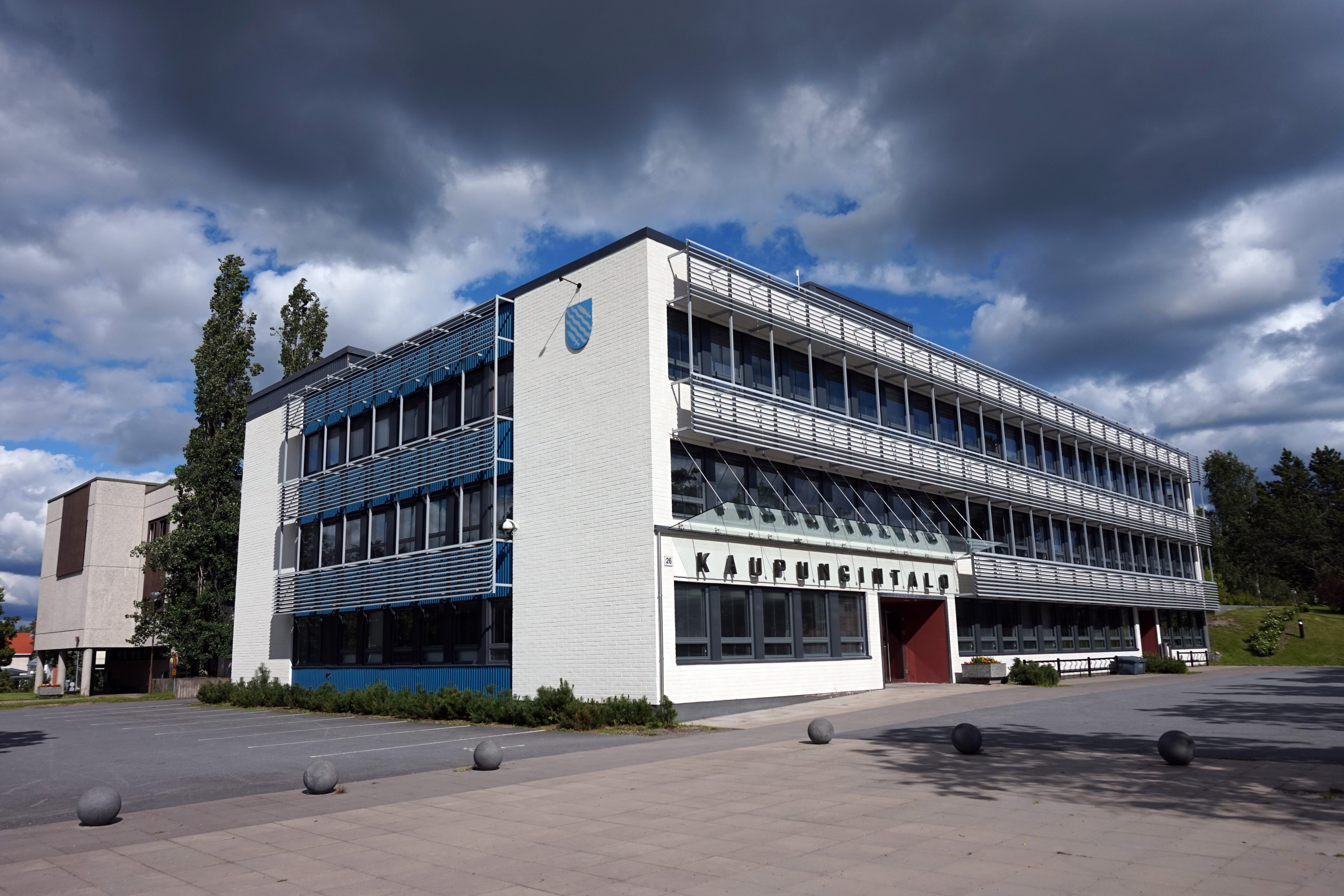
Virrat Town Hall

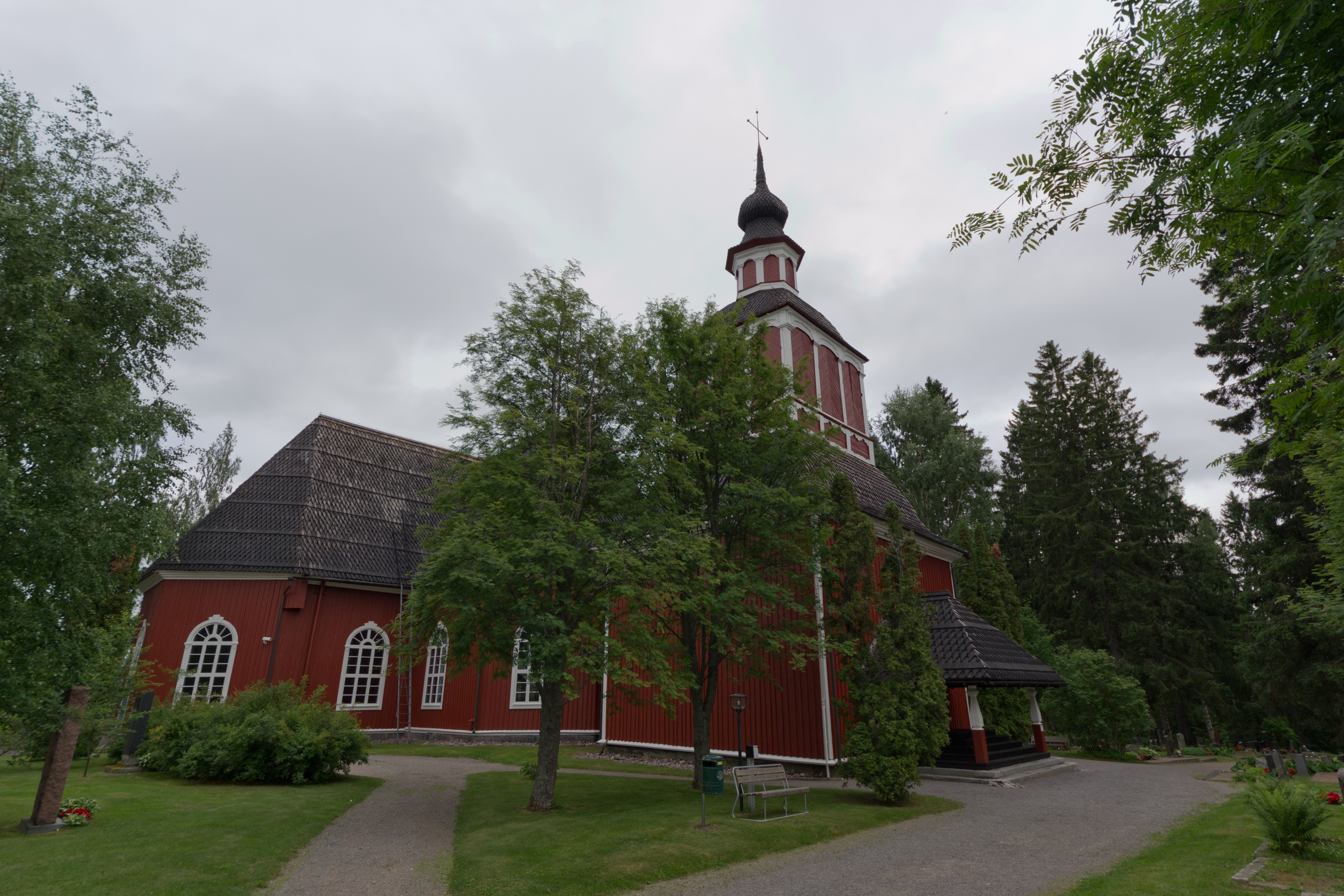
Virrat Church

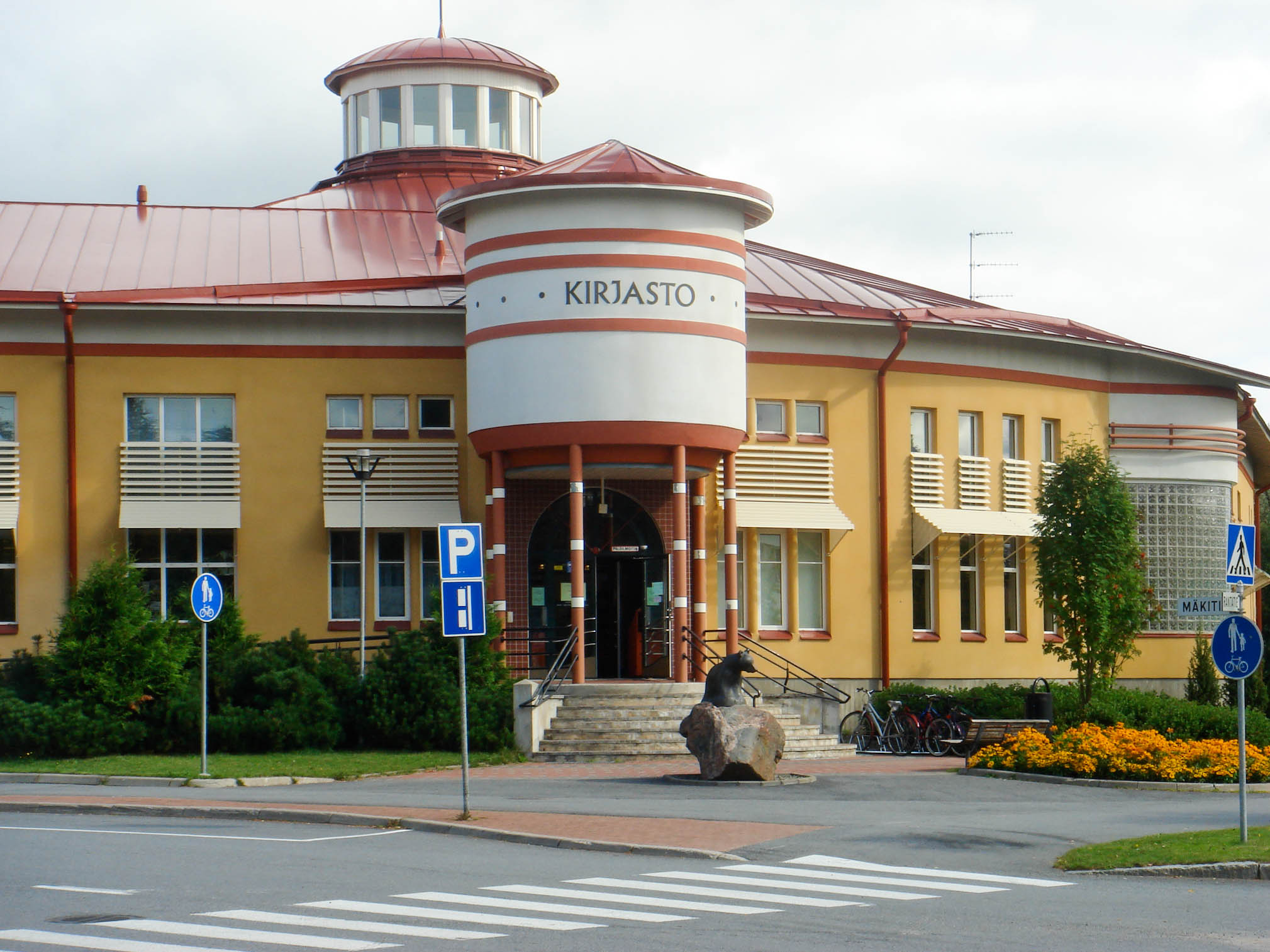
Virrat Library

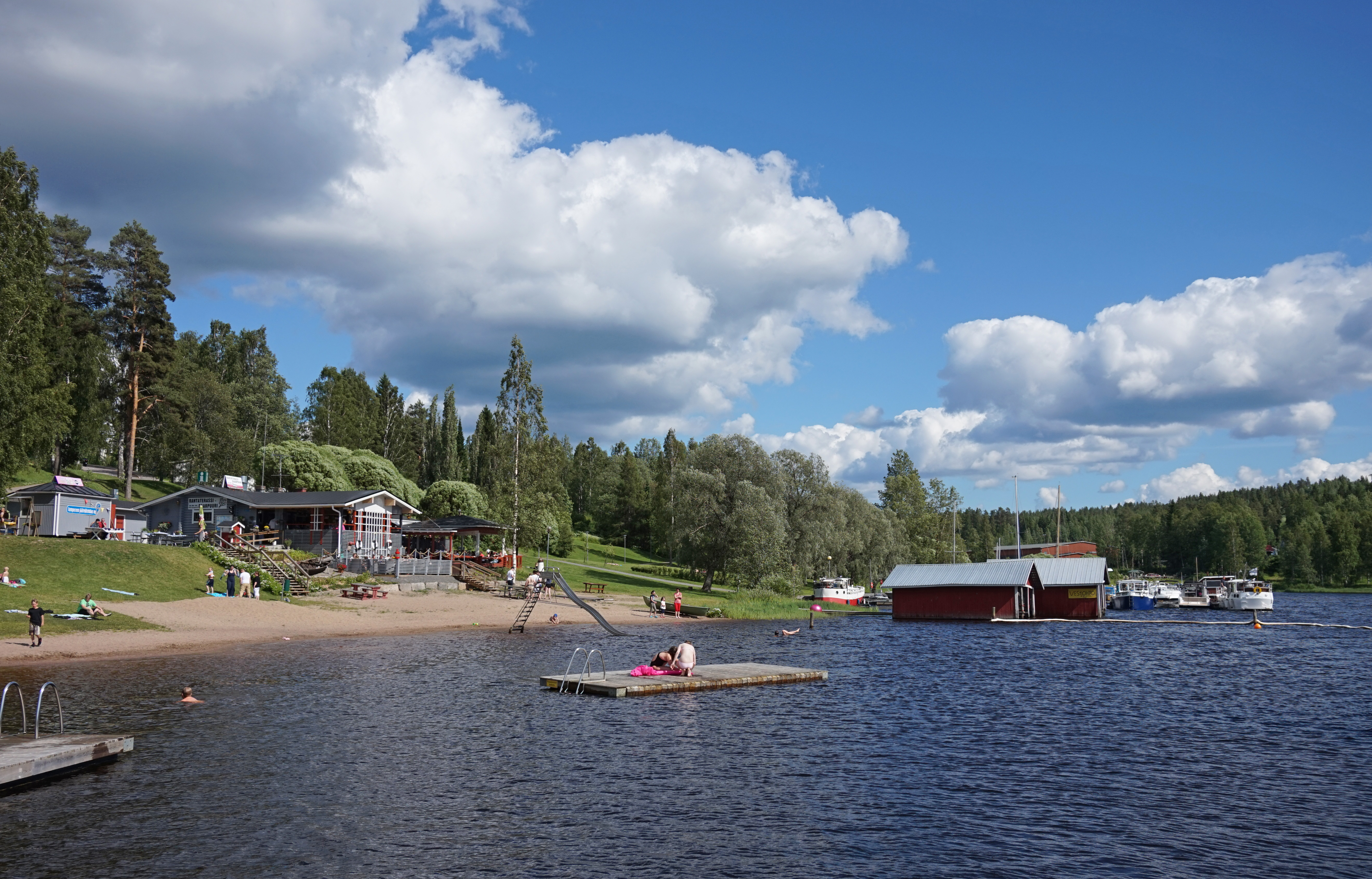
A beach at the Kalettomanlahti Bay in Virrat

== See also ==
- Finnish Lake Road
