= Jorma Gallen-Kallela =

Finnish painter (1898–1939)

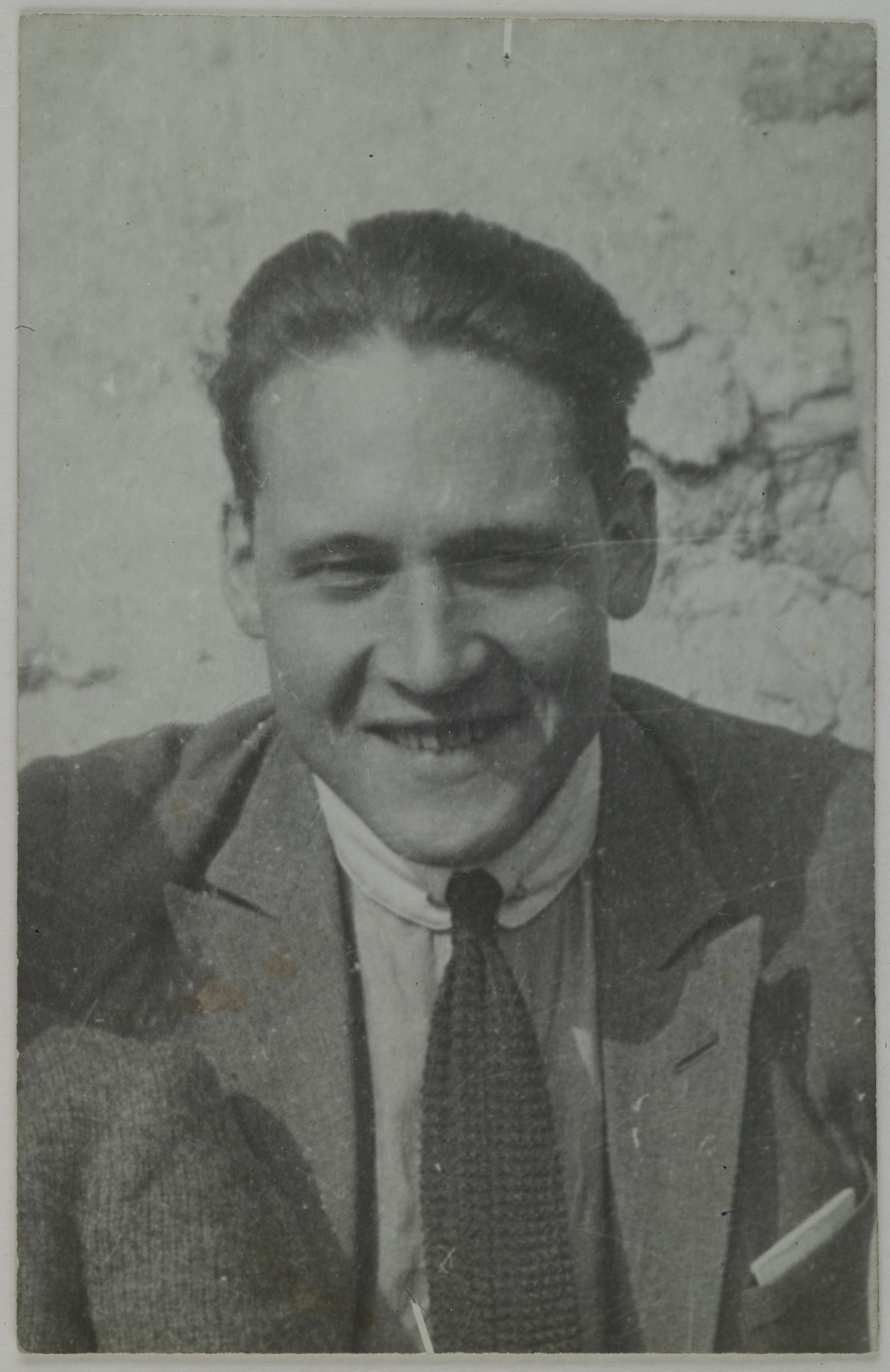
Jorma Gallen-Kallela in Paris in the 1920s.

Jorma Gallen-Kallela (né Gallén) (22 November 1898 – 1 December 1939) was a Finnish artist. He followed in the footsteps of his father, the famed artist Akseli Gallen-Kallela.

== Biography ==
Gallen-Kallela was born in Ruovesi. He studied arts in Buenos Aires in 1915–17, in Copenhagen in 1918–19, under Maurice Denis in Paris in 1919–21, and lastly in Vienna in 1929.

He fought in the Finnish Civil War on the side of the White Guard.

He worked with his father on the Kalevala cupola frescoes at the lobby of the National Museum of Finland in 1928. In 1931, after his father had died and a fire destroyed his father's frescoes in the Jusélius Mausoleum, he used his father's sketches as basis to repaint the frescoes.

His independent works were the artworks for the Kalevala and Rintamamies postage stamps.

He fought in the Winter War, having risen to the rank of lieutenant. While he was inspecting a downed plane of the Soviet Air Force with captain Adolf Ehrnrooth on either the first or the second day of the war, he and Ehrnrooth were ambushed. He saved Ehrnrooth by throwing himself over him, but he himself died from his wounds.

He was survived by his wife and their two children.

== Gallery ==
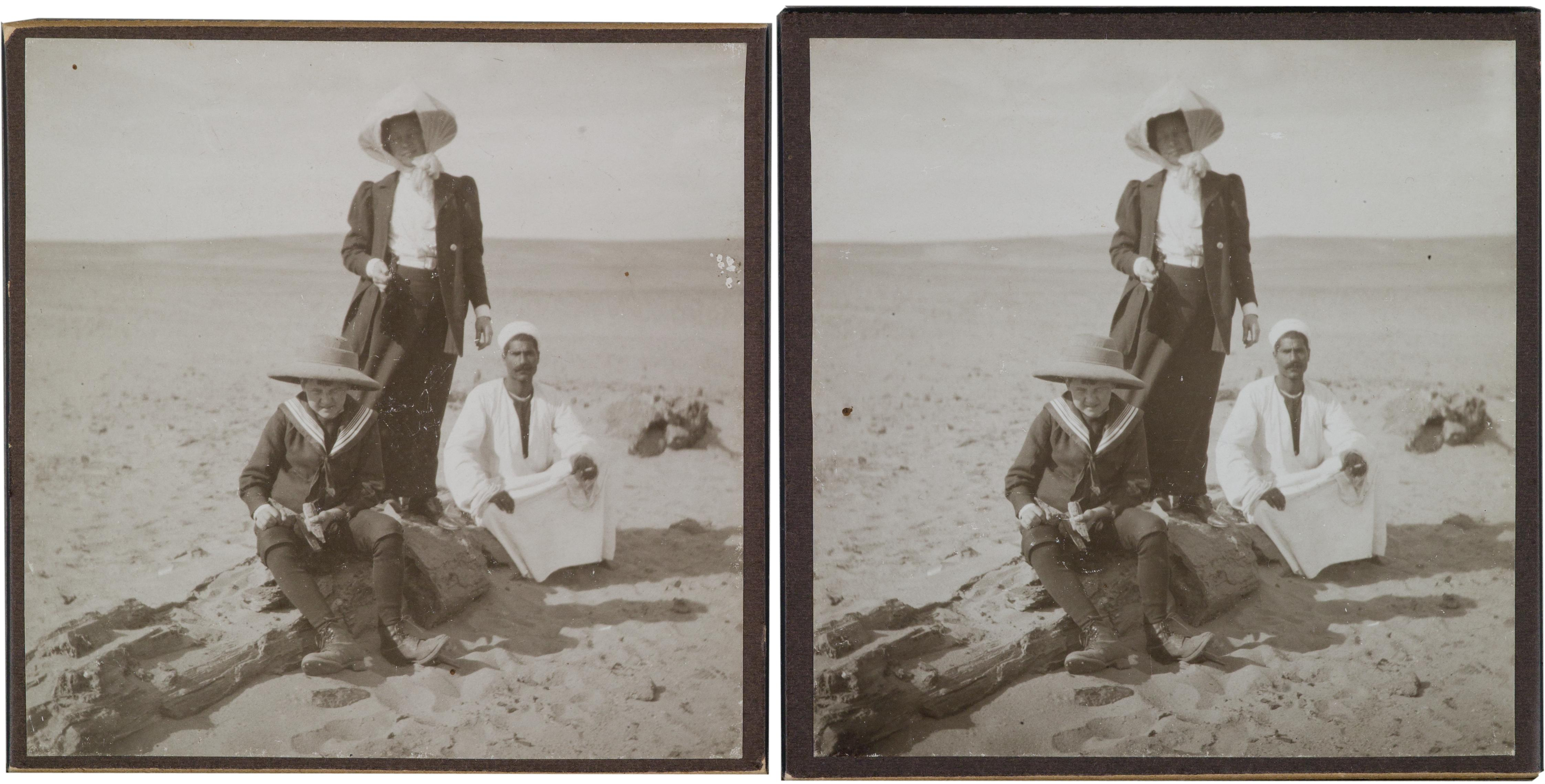
Jorma and Mary Gallen-Kallela with a guide in Egypt, 1910

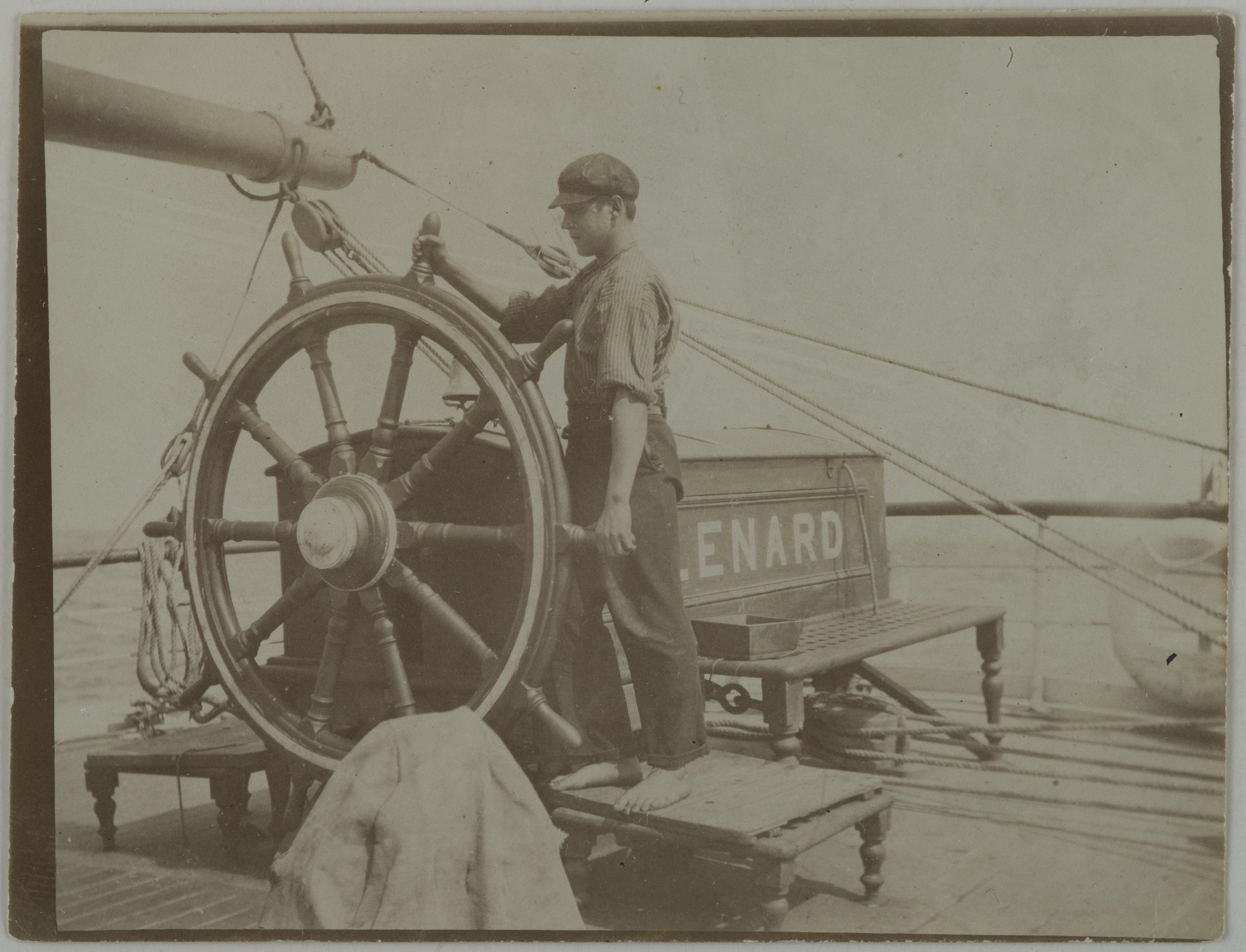
Jorma Gallen-Kallela sailing on the school ship Glenard on the Pacific Ocean, 1915

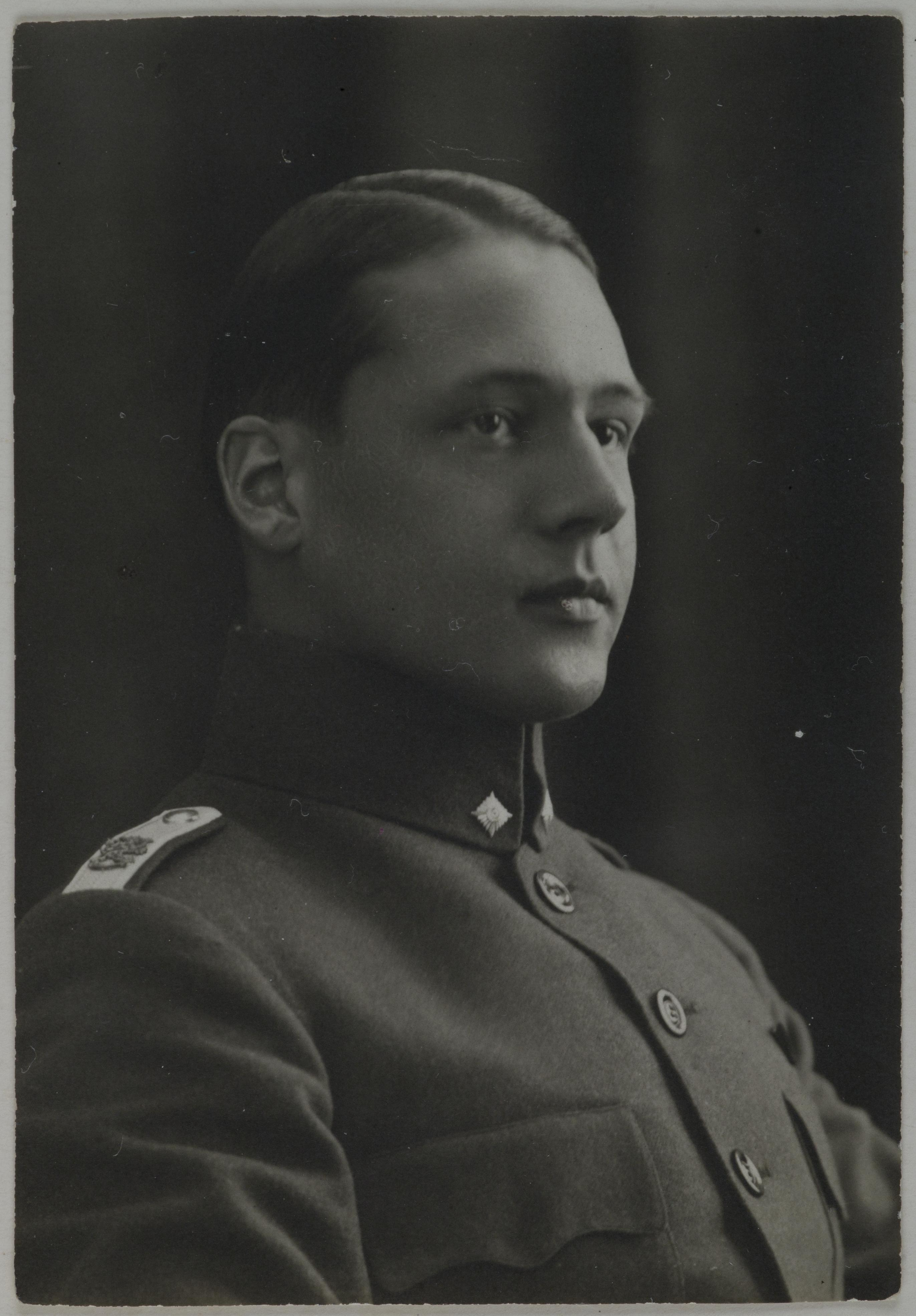
Portrait of Jorma Gallen-Kallela shortly after the Finnish Civil War, 1918

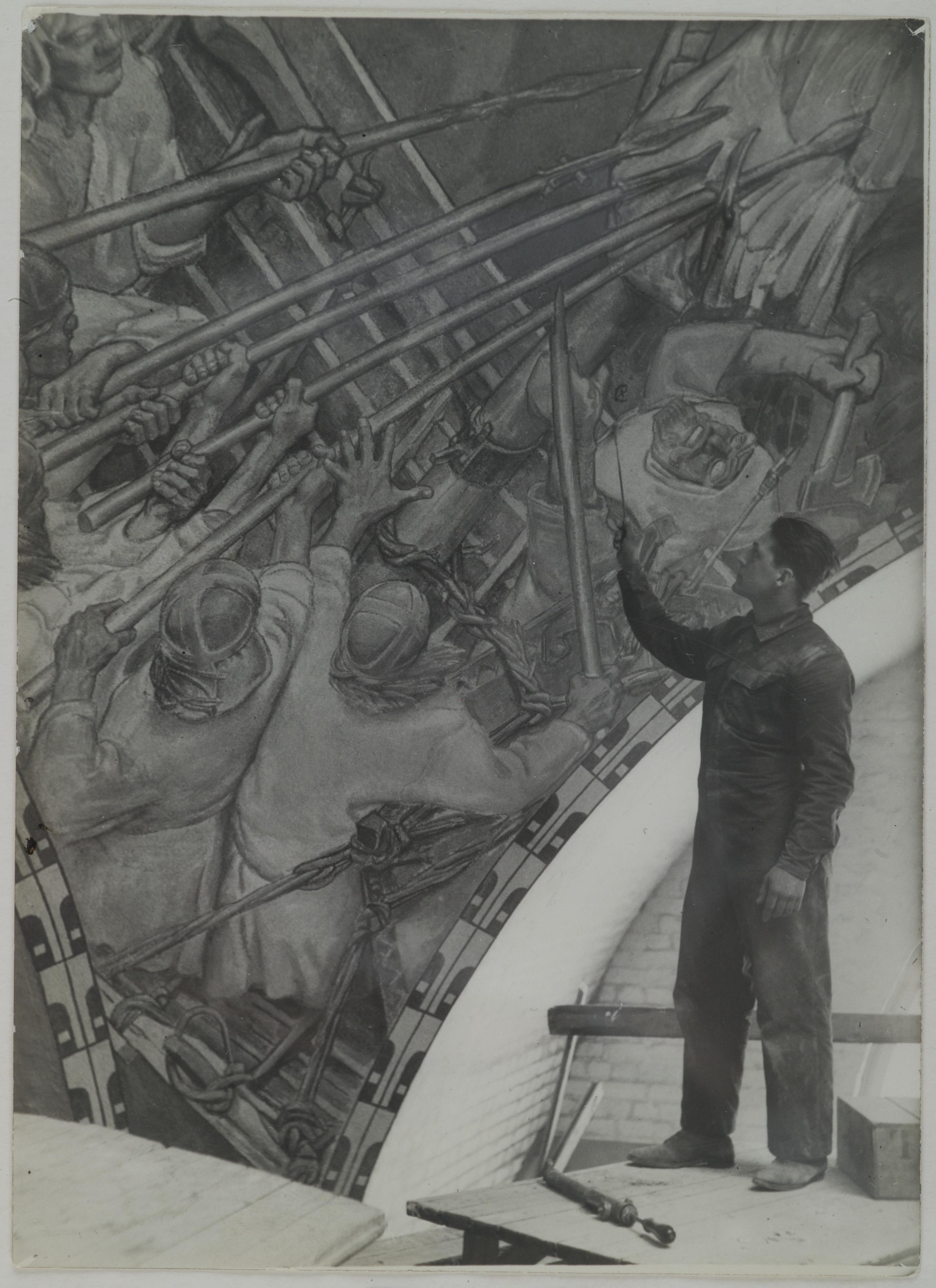
Jorma Gallen-Kallela painting the Kalevala cupola fresco The Defense of the Sampo in the National Museum of Finland, 1928

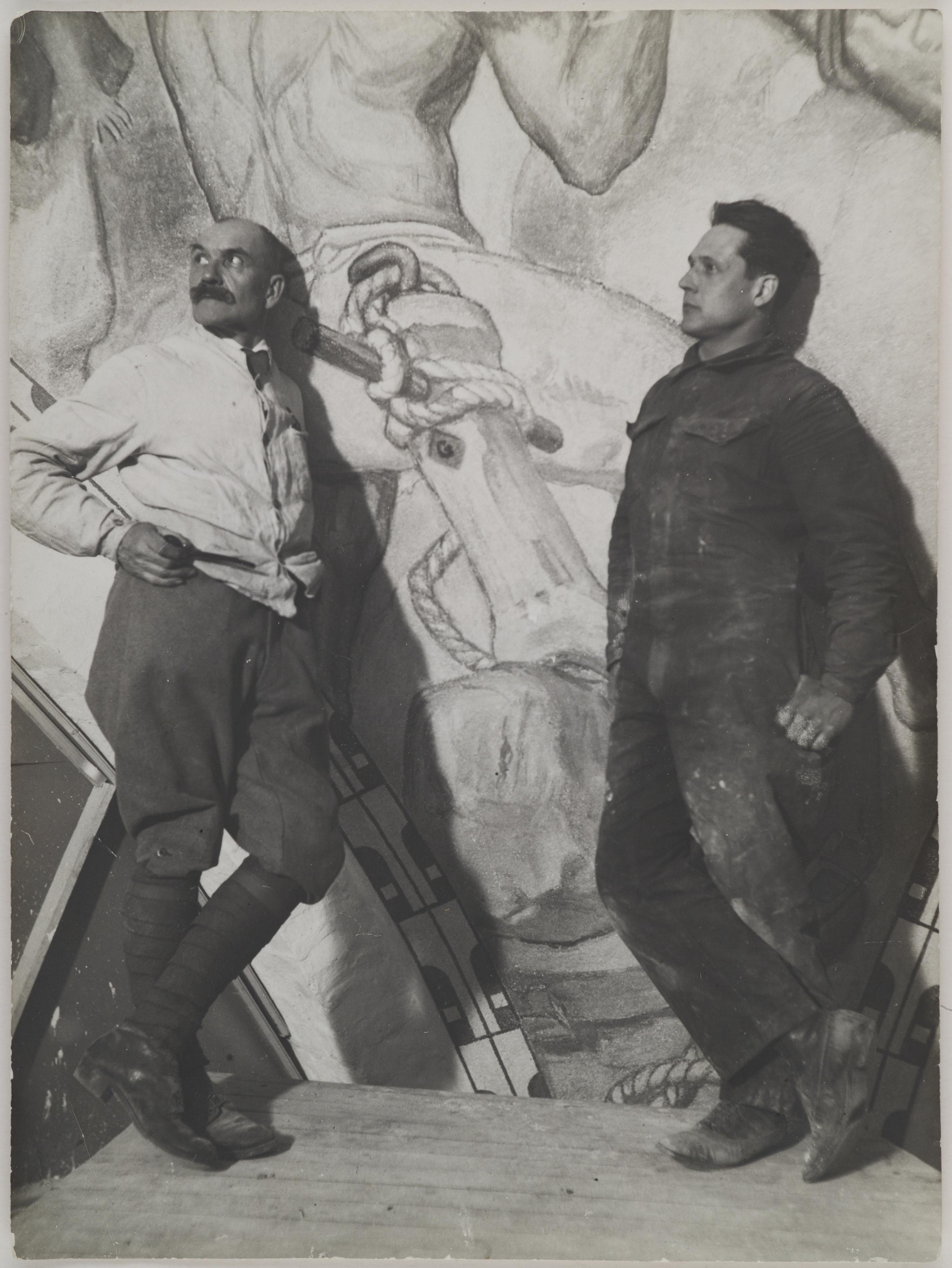
With his father Akseli by the Kalevala cupola fresco, 1928

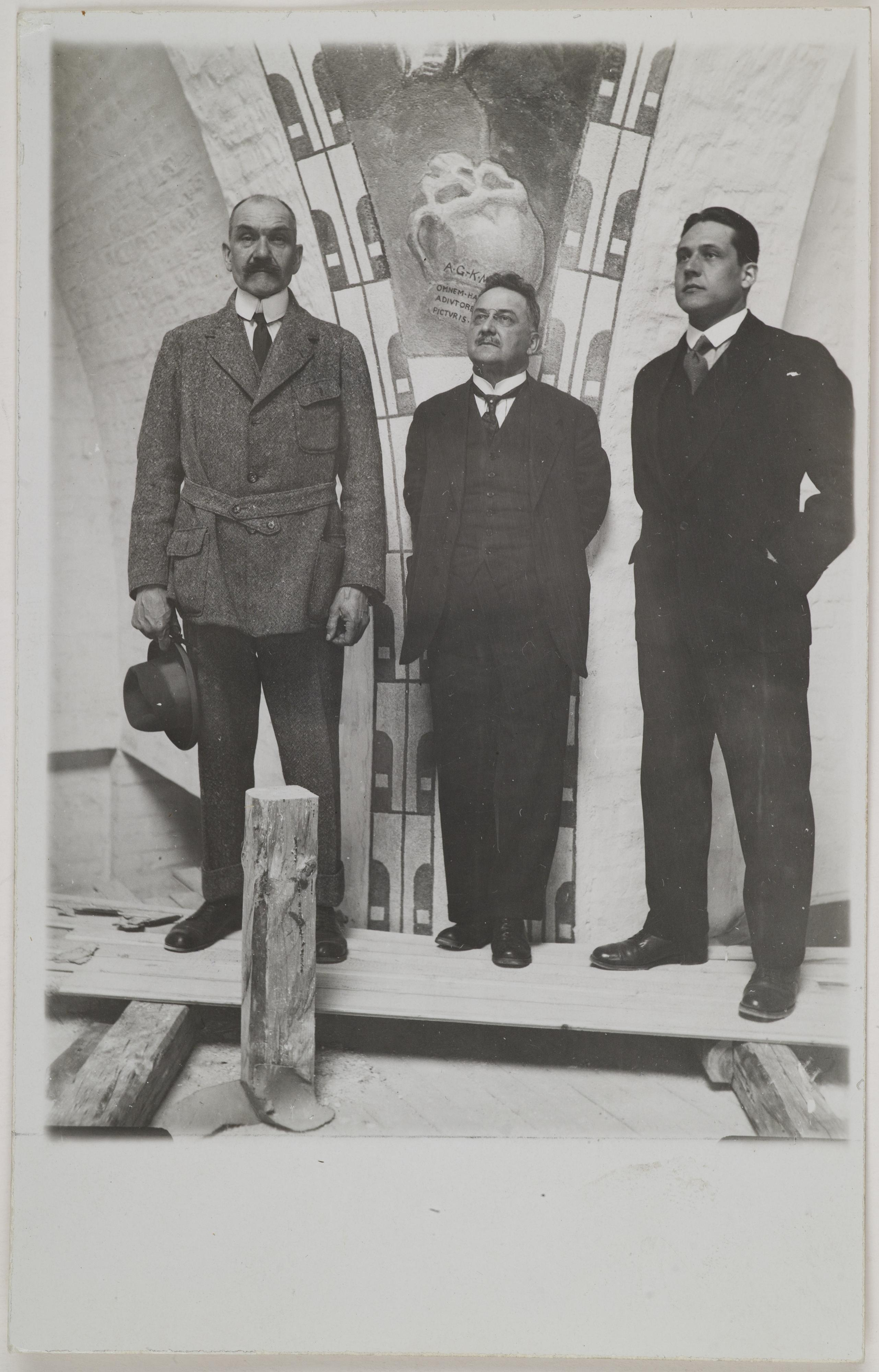
His father Akseli, U. T. Sirelius and himself

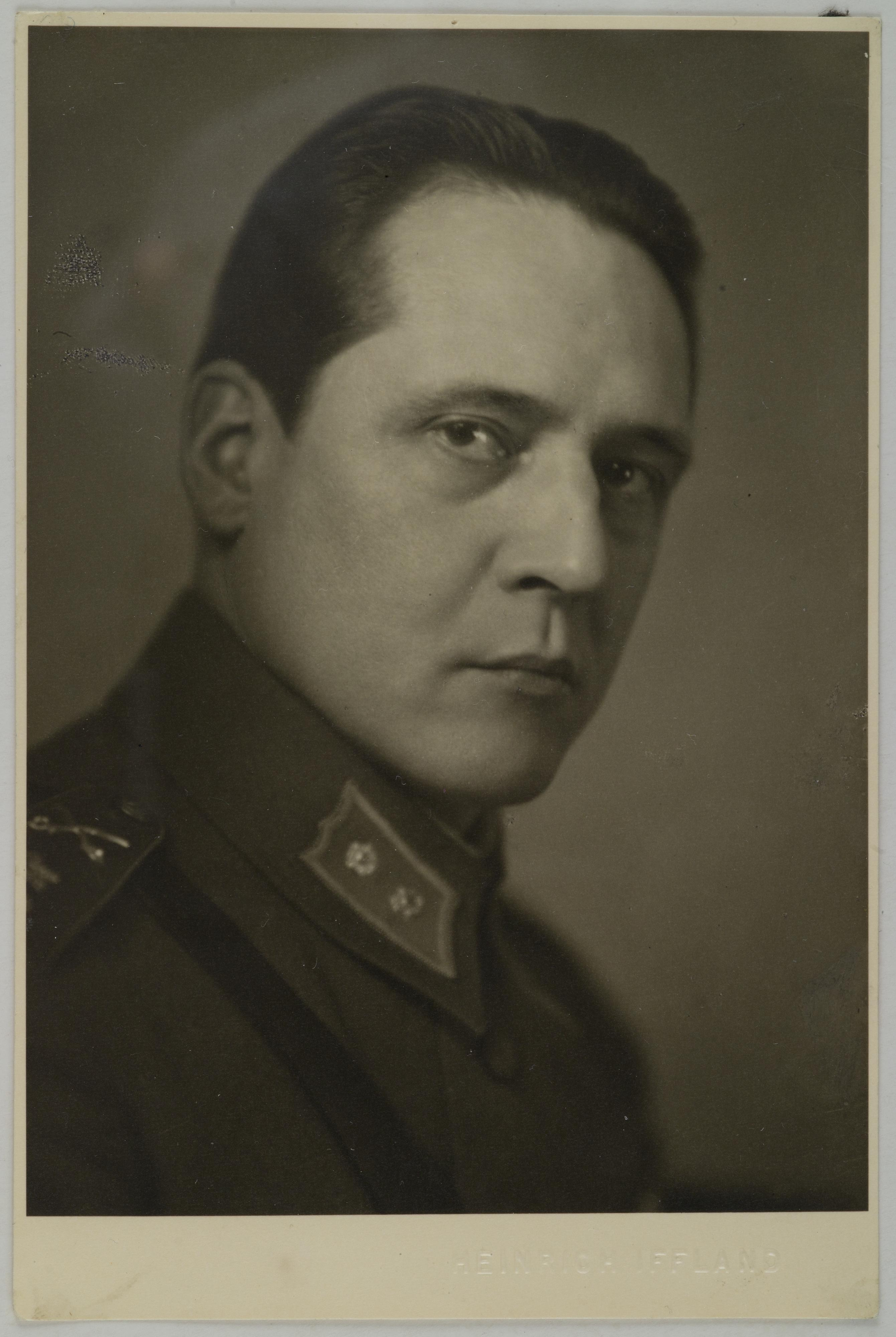
Portrait of him as a lieutenant in the 1930s
