= Emmi (Finnish singer) =

Finnish singer-songwriter

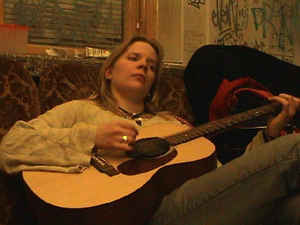
- Emmi playing guitar

Background information
- Born: Emmi Kangasjärvi; 10 October 1979 (age 46)
- Instruments: Vocals, guitar
- Years active: 2000-2009

Emmi is a Finnish singer-songwriter who sings in English. She was born on October 10, 1979, in Vilppula, Finland. She became famous thanks to her single Breakable, which was released in February 2001. In May 2001 her second single Crashing Down and her debut album Solitary Motions were released. Two other quite well known songs from that album are Green Car and Solitary Motions. She was nominated as the Best Nordic Act by MTV Europe Music Awards in 2001. However, the award was won by the Danish band Safri Duo.

There are two versions of Emmi's second album No Nothing. The first one was released only for Finnish market in October 2002. The second one was released for international as well as Finnish market in early 2003. The differences between the versions are the order of songs and the fact that the second version contains two tracks that are not contained in the first version, namely Into The World and World Is Crazy. Conversely, the song Toss Me Down is contained in the first version but not in the second one.

The single Eileen was released in 2005. On October 5, 2005, Emmi's third album Can Full of Joy was released.
