= List of cities and towns in Finland =

The following is a list of cities and towns (Finnish: kaupunki, Swedish: stad) in Finland. (Note: Both town and city translate to kaupunki in Finnish.) The basic administrative unit of Finland is the municipality. Since 1977, there is no legal difference between towns and municipalities, and a municipality can independently decide to call itself a city or town if it considers that it meets the requirements of an urban settlement. The following list includes the municipalities that use the word kaupunki in their official name. For cities and towns founded before the 1960s, the list includes the year it was chartered.

The names used in this encyclopedia are usually the Finnish or Swedish forms, depending on the majority language of the municipality, except when there is a commonly used English name.

== Cities (founded) ==
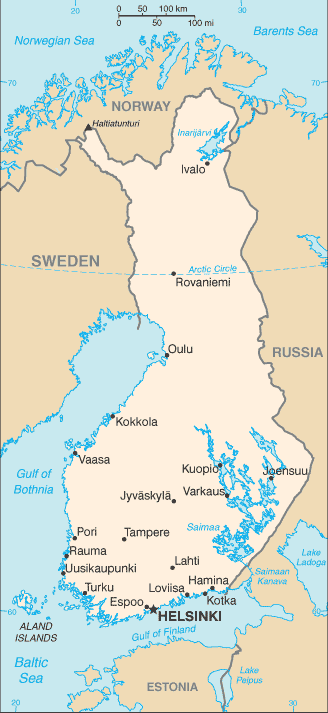
Map of Finland

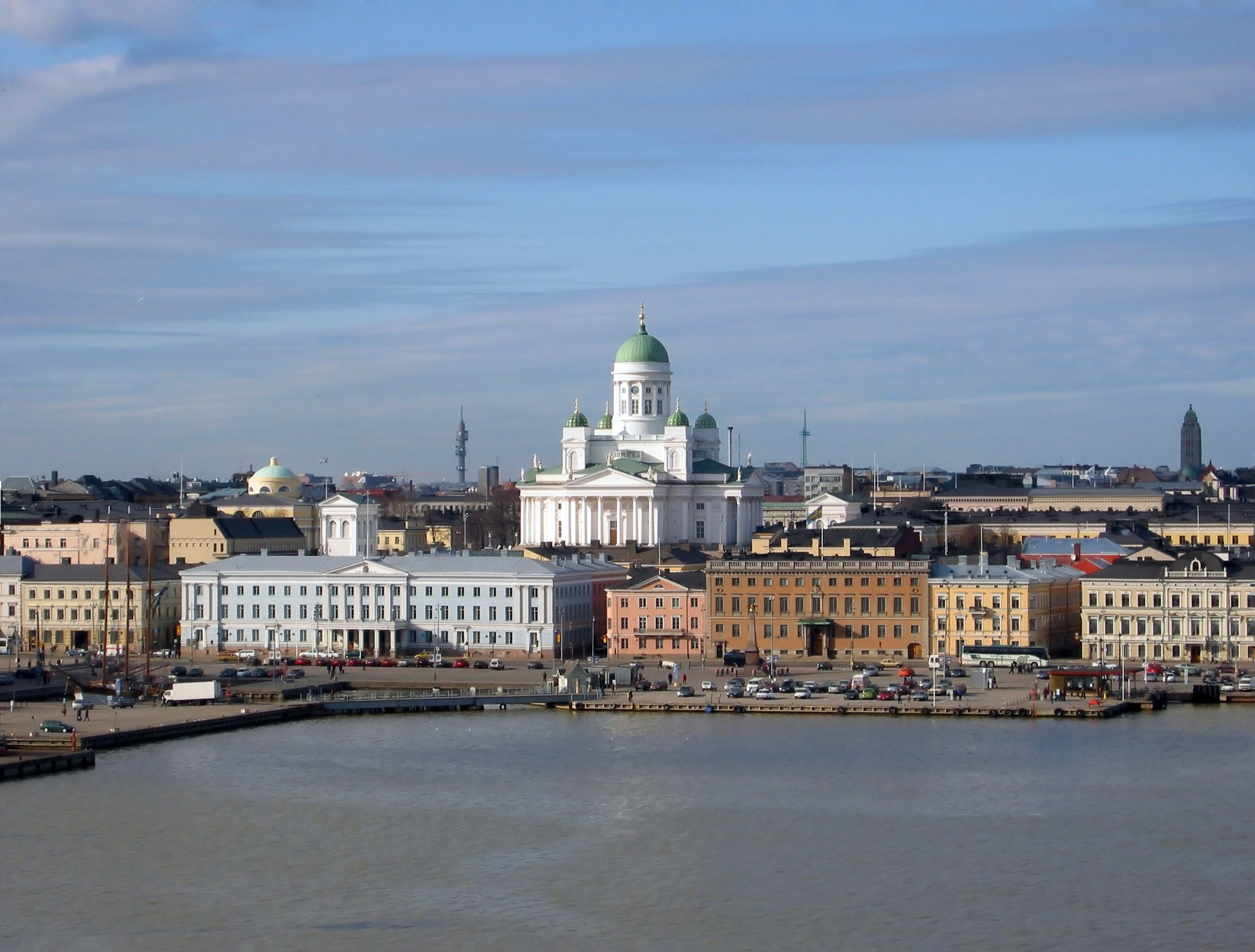
Helsinki

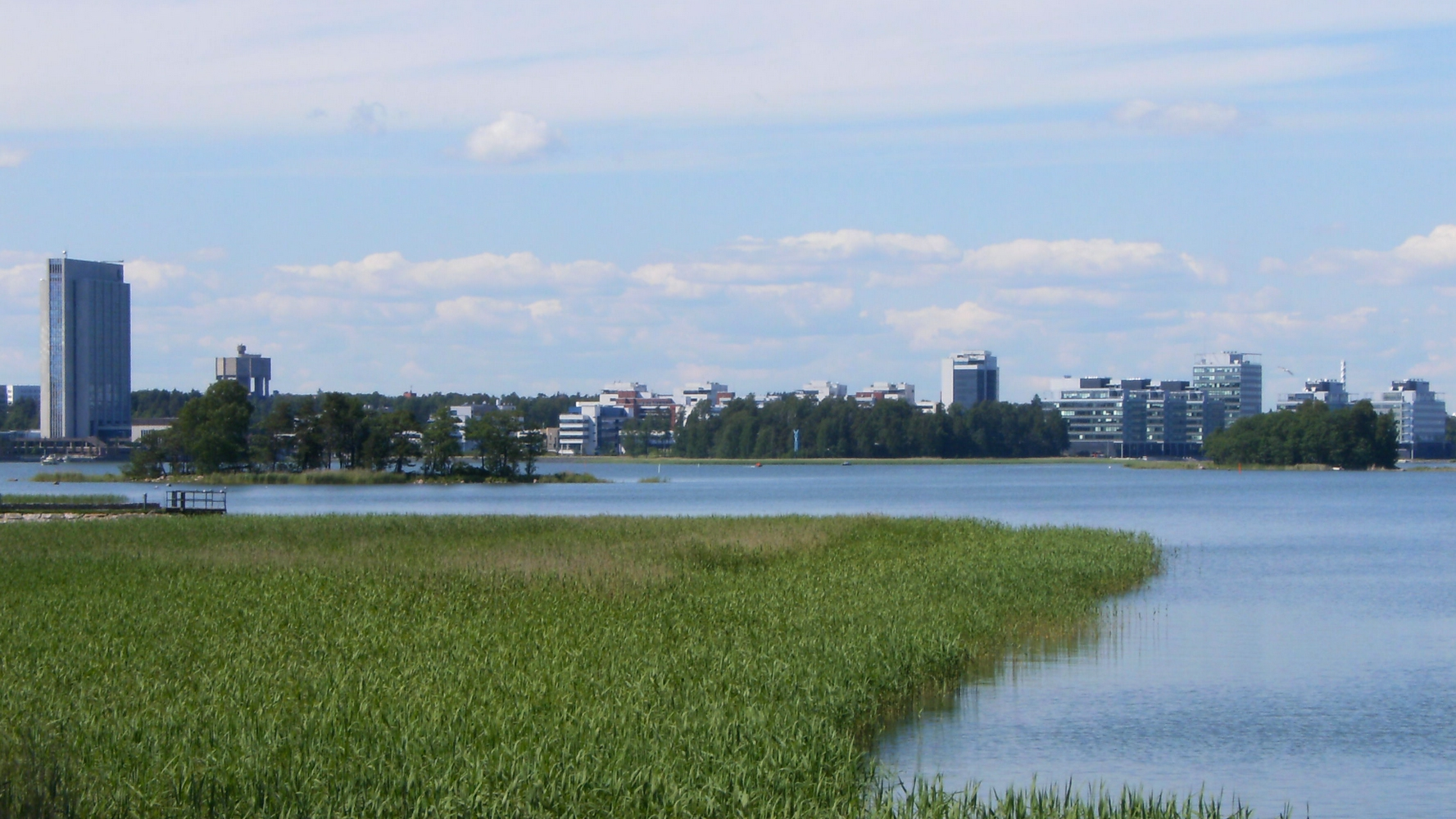
Espoo

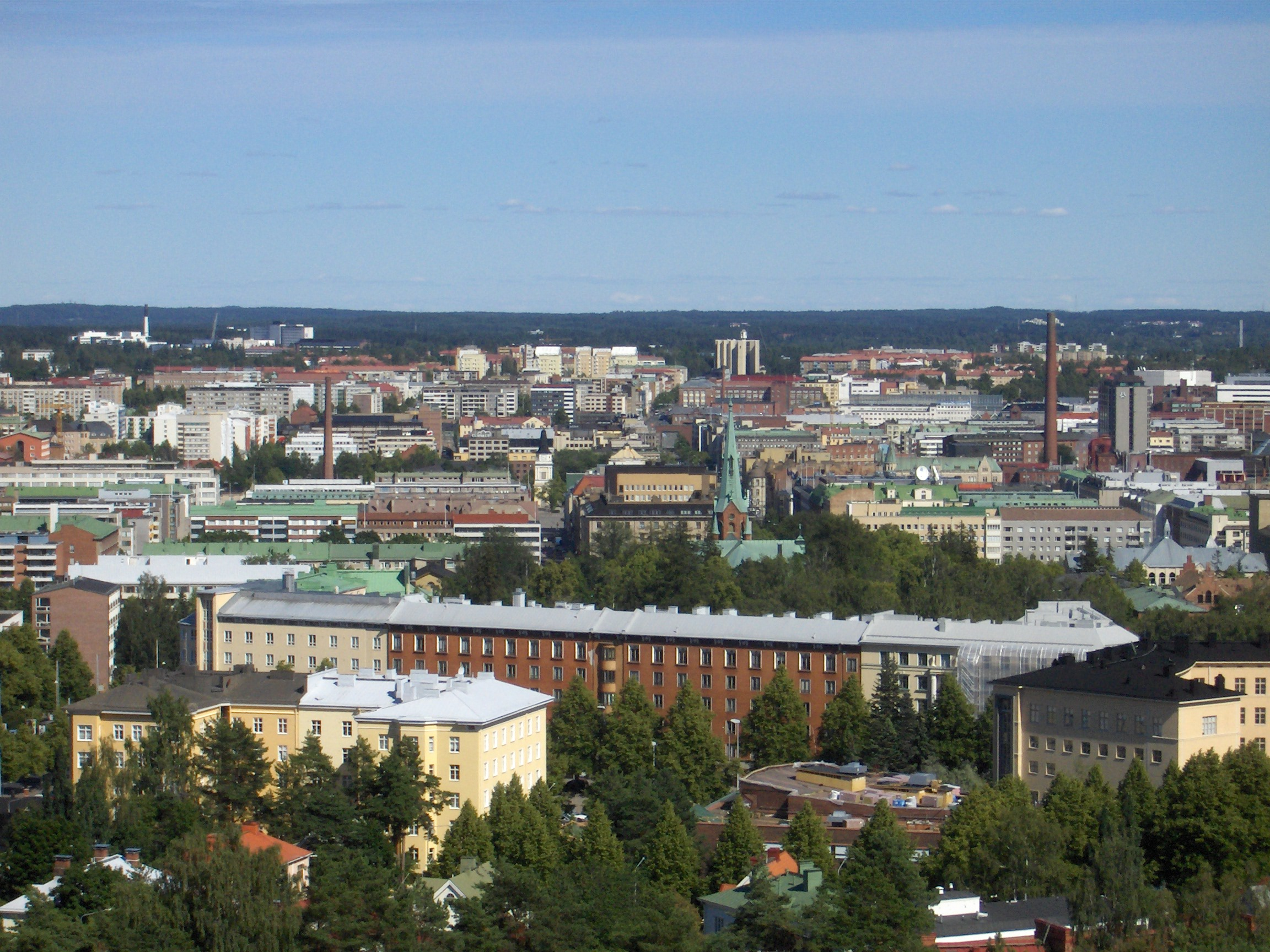
Tampere

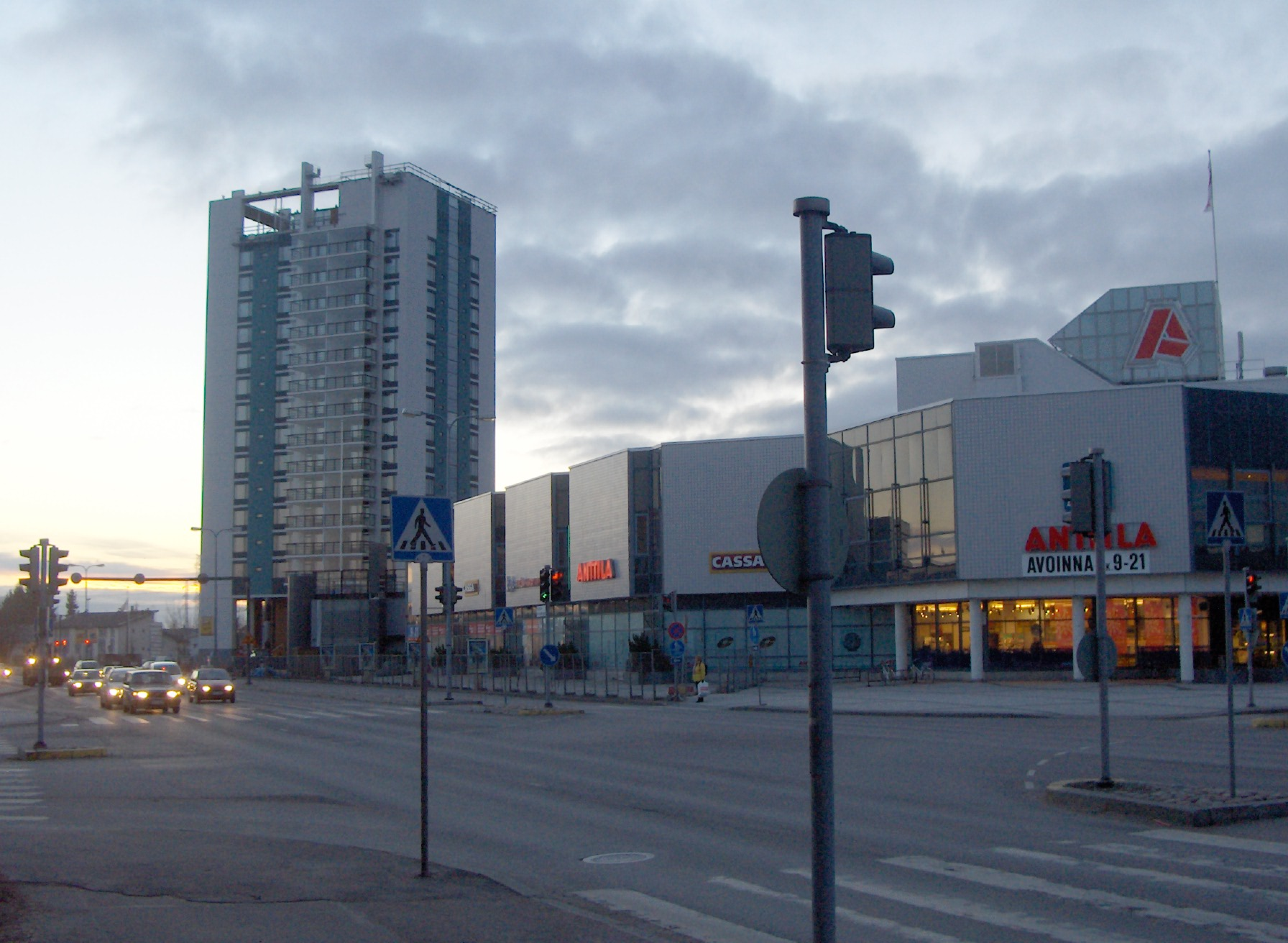
Vantaa

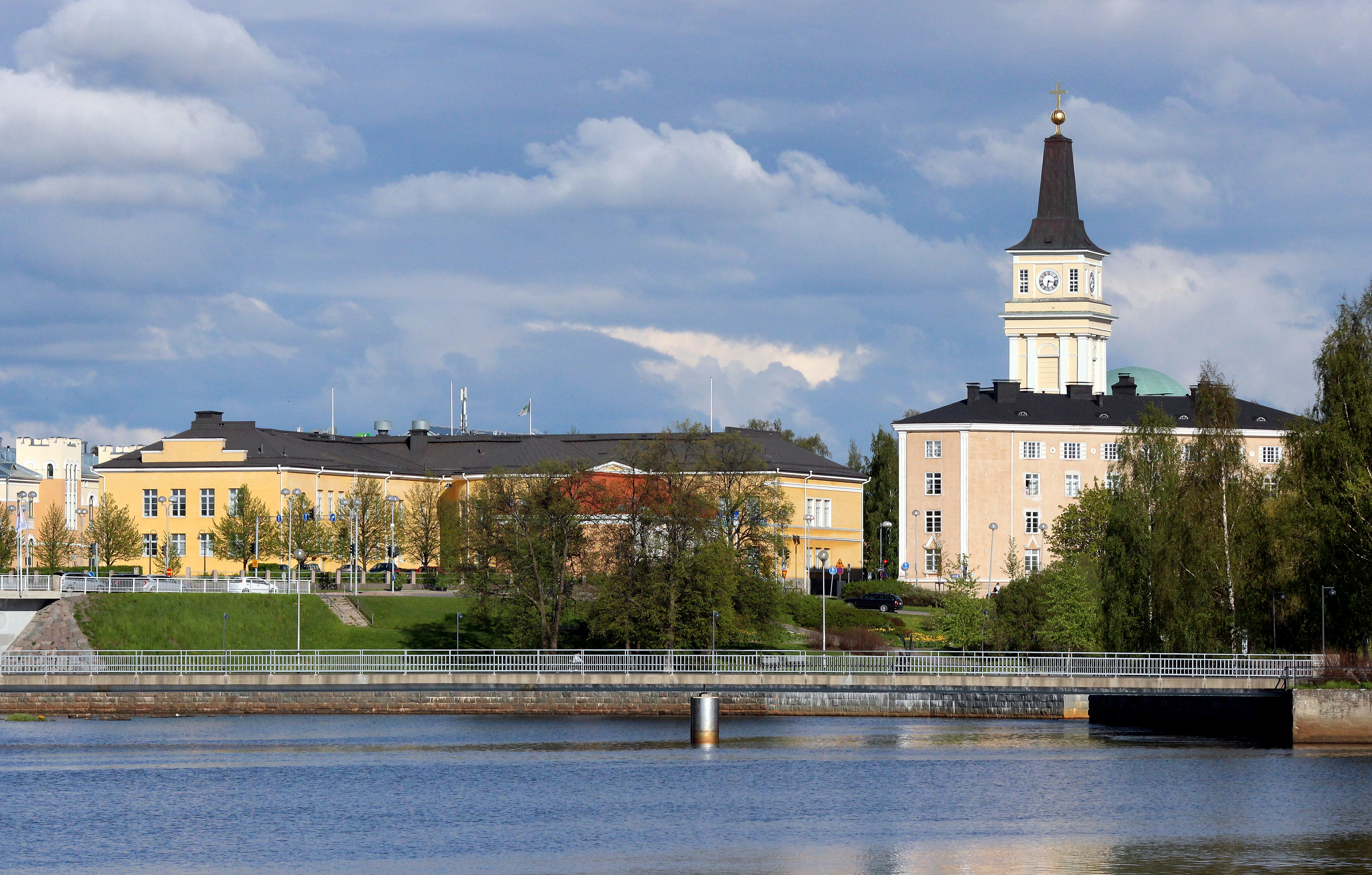
Oulu

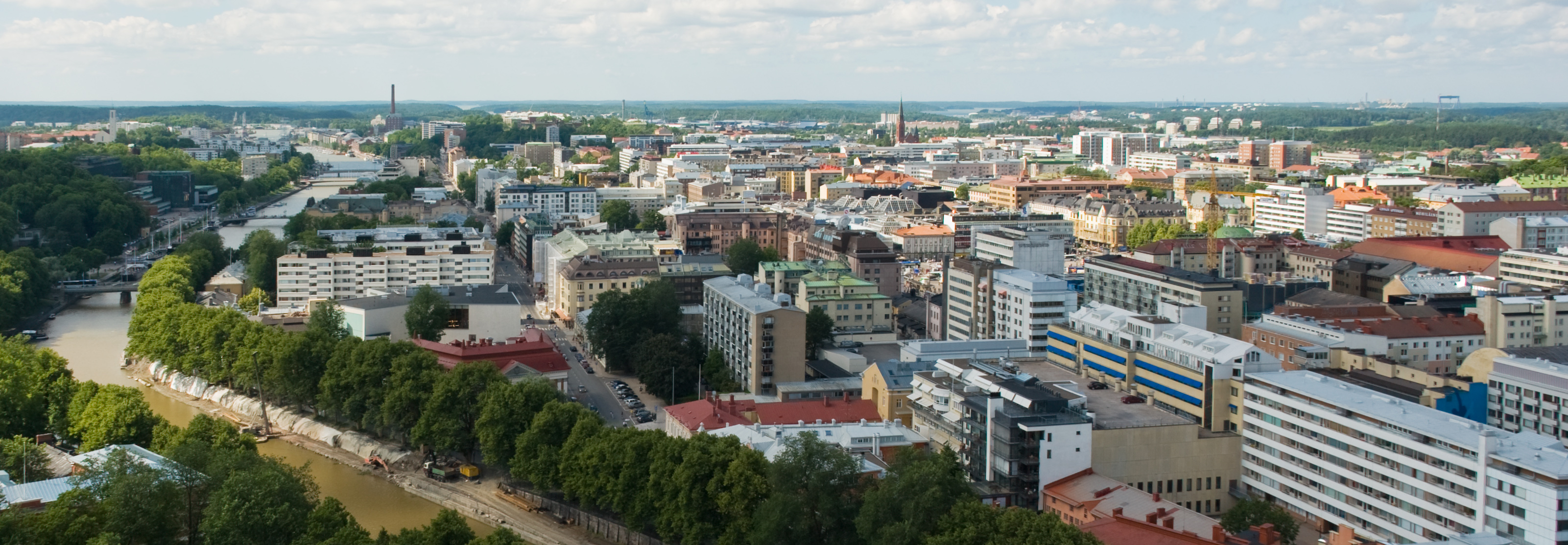
Turku

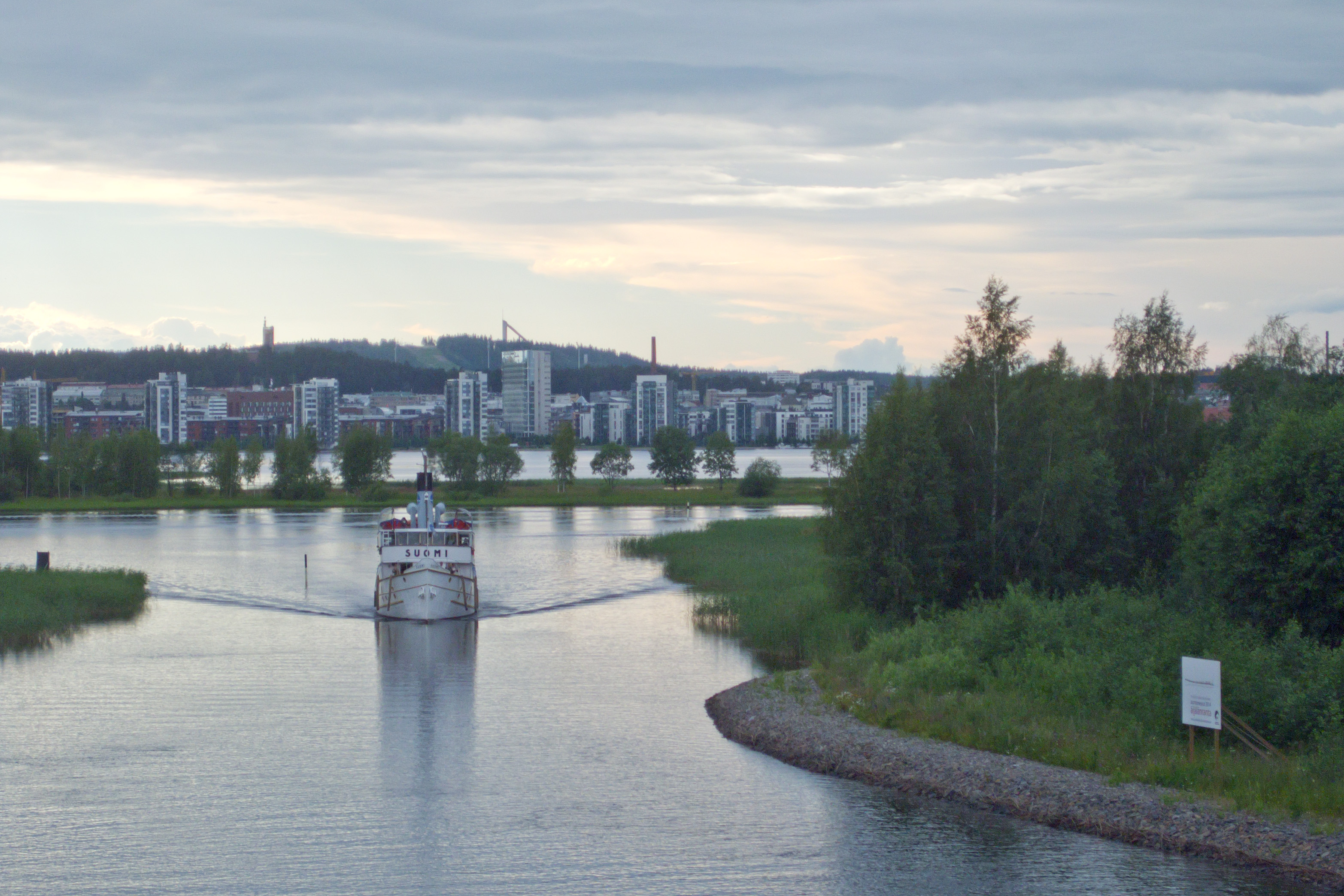
Jyväskylä

Finnish name	Swedish name	Urban area	Founded	Population
Akaa (Note: Administrative center is the locality of Toijala, which became a city in 1977.)	Ackas		2007	16,709
Alajärvi			1986	9,752
Alavus	Alavo		1977	11,611
Espoo	Esbo	Helsinki	1972	281,866
Forssa			1964	17,079
Haapajärvi			1977	7,178
Haapavesi			1996	6,895
Hamina	Fredrikshamn		1653	20,410
Hanko	Hangö		1874	8,448
Harjavalta		Pori	1977	7,076
Heinola			1839	19,007
Helsinki	Helsingfors	Helsinki	1550	648,650
Huittinen	Vittis		1977	10,140
Hyvinkää	Hyvinge		1960	46,622
Hämeenlinna	Tavastehus		1639	67,713
Iisalmi	Idensalmi		1891	21,546
Ikaalinen	Ikalis		1977	7,037
Imatra			1971	27,035
Pietarsaari	Jakobstad		1652	19,303
Joensuu			1848	76,228
Jyväskylä			1837	140,812
Jämsä (Note: Includes a former city of Jämsänkoski, which became a city in 1986.)			1977	20,764
Järvenpää	Träskända	Helsinki	1967	43,170
Kaarina	S:t Karins	Turku	1993	33,335
Kajaani	Kajana		1651	37,039
Kalajoki			1865	12,446
Kangasala		Tampere	2018	31,815
Kankaanpää			1972	11,506
Kannus			1986	5,496
Karkkila	Högfors		1977	8,804
Kaskinen	Kaskö		1785	1,275
Kauhajoki			2001	13,441
Kauhava			1986	16,159
Kauniainen	Grankulla	Helsinki	1972	9,577
Kemi			1869	21,019
Kemijärvi			1973	7,410
Kerava	Kervo	Helsinki	1970	36,174
Keuruu	Keuru		1986	9,858
Kitee	Kides		1992	10,382
Kiuruvesi			1993	8,196
Kokemäki	Kumo	Pori	1977	7,300
Kokkola	Karleby		1620	47,723
Kotka			1878	53,110
Kouvola (Note: Includes former cities of Anjalankoski and Kuusankoski, which became cities in 1977 and 1973, respectively.)			1960	83,600
Kristiinankaupunki	Kristinestad		1649	6,605
Kuhmo			1986	8,377
Kuopio (Note: Includes former cities of Juankoski and Nilsiä, both became cities in 1998.)			1775	118,434
Kurikka			1977	21,050
Kuusamo			2000	15,219
Lahti	Lahtis		1905	119,999
Laitila	Letala		1986	8,658
Lappeenranta (Note: Includes a former city of Joutseno, which became a city in 2005.)	Villmanstrand		1649	72,801
Lapua	Lappo		1977	14,545
Lieksa			1973	11,157
Lohja	Lojo		1969	46,490
Loimaa			1969	16,106
Loviisa	Lovisa		1745	14,968
Maarianhamina	Mariehamn		1861	11,769
Mikkeli	S:t Michel		1838	53,983
Mänttä-Vilppula (Note: Administrative center is the locality of Mänttä, which became a city in 1973.)			2009	10,062
Naantali	Nådendal	Turku	1443	19,168
Nivala			1992	10,764
Nokia		Tampere	1977	33,403
Nurmes			1974	7,675
Uusikaarlepyy	Nykarleby		1620	7,476
Närpiö	Närpes		1993	9,503
Orimattila			1992	16,071
Orivesi			1986	9,221
Oulainen			1977	7,457
Oulu	Uleåborg	Oulu	1605	202,753
Outokumpu			1977	6,825
Paimio	Pemar	Turku	1997	10,784
Parainen	Pargas	Turku	1977	15,261
Parkano			1977	6,519
Pieksämäki			1962	18,039
Pori	Björneborg	Pori	1558	84,566
Porvoo	Borgå		1346	50,224
Pudasjärvi			2004	8,033
Pyhäjärvi (Note: Administrative center is the locality of Pyhäsalmi, the city also carried this name from 1993 to 1996.)			1993	5,282
Raahe	Brahestad		1649	24,852
Raasepori	Raseborg (Note: Administrative center is the locality of Ekenäs (founded in 1546), also includes a former city of Karis (became a city in 1977).)		2009	27,792
Raisio	Reso	Turku	1974	24,219
Rauma	Raumo		1442	39,401
Riihimäki			1960	28,835
Rovaniemi			1960	62,667
Saarijärvi			1986	9,509
Salo			1960	52,580
Sastamala (Note: Administrative center is the locality of Vammala, which became a city in 1965.)			2009	24,727
Savonlinna	Nyslott		1639	33,866
Seinäjoki			1960	63,072
Somero			1993	8,859
Suonenjoki			1977	7,179
Tampere	Tammerfors	Tampere	1779	234,441
Tornio	Torneå		1621	21,912
Turku	Åbo	Turku	1200–1300	190,935
Ulvila	Ulvsby	Pori	1365 to 1558, later 2000	13,074
Uusikaupunki	Nystad		1617	15,737
Vaasa	Vasa		1606	67,465
Valkeakoski			1963	21,199
Vantaa	Vanda	Helsinki	1974	226,160
Varkaus			1962	20,956
Viitasaari			1996	6,295
Virrat	Virdois		1977	6,756
Ylivieska			1971	15,205
Ylöjärvi		Tampere	2004	33,034
Ähtäri	Etseri		1986	5,788
Äänekoski (Note: Includes a former city of Suolahti, which became a city in 1977.)			1973	18,971

== See also ==
- List of municipalities of Finland
- List of urban areas in Finland by population
