= Sukanen Ship Pioneer Village and Museum =

Museum in Saskatchewan, Canada

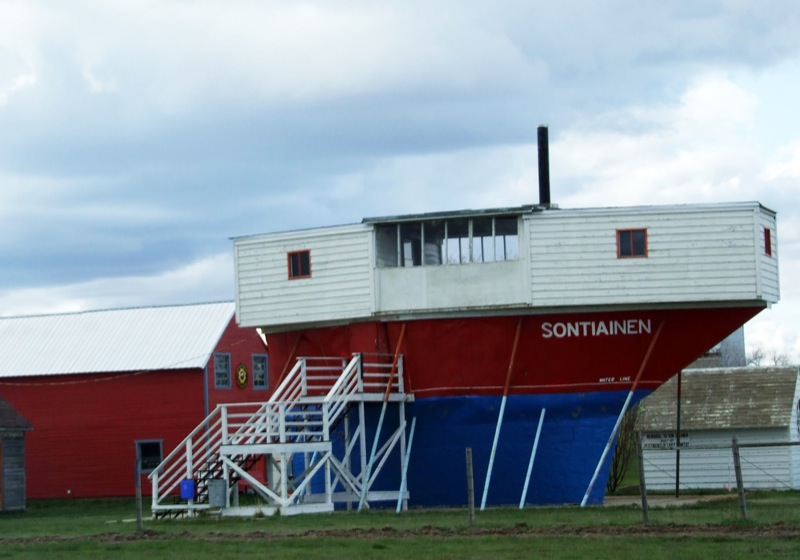
- Interactive map of the Sukanen Ship Pioneer Village and Museum area

General information
- Location: Moose Jaw, Saskatchewan, Canada
- Coordinates: 50.28103°N 105.53788°W
- Demolished: Museum
- Client: Moose Jaw Car Club

The Sukanen Ship Pioneer Village and Museum is located south of the City of Moose Jaw, Saskatchewan, Canada, on Highway 2. It has many displays of life on the Canadian Prairies, including many historic buildings that have been moved from surrounding communities, set up to mimic that of a small farming town from the early 1900s to 1930s.

The car club at Moose Jaw agreed to the restoration of Tom Sukanen's ship at their museum site. Tom Sukanen was a Finnish homesteader who settled near Birsay who hoped to travel home again on his ship he assembled near the South Saskatchewan River.

The Sukanen Ship Pioneer Village and Museum features a typical village replete with pioneer artifacts and tractors, cars and trucks, even a McCabe's Grain Co. grain elevator built in 1913 standing approximately 68 feet (21 m) tall. The elevator was moved from Mawer in 2007 to its new location, nearly 60 km southeast of its original location. The village is restored by the Moose Jaw car club, and is run by volunteers.

== See also ==
- List of museums in Saskatchewan
