= Eero Rahola =

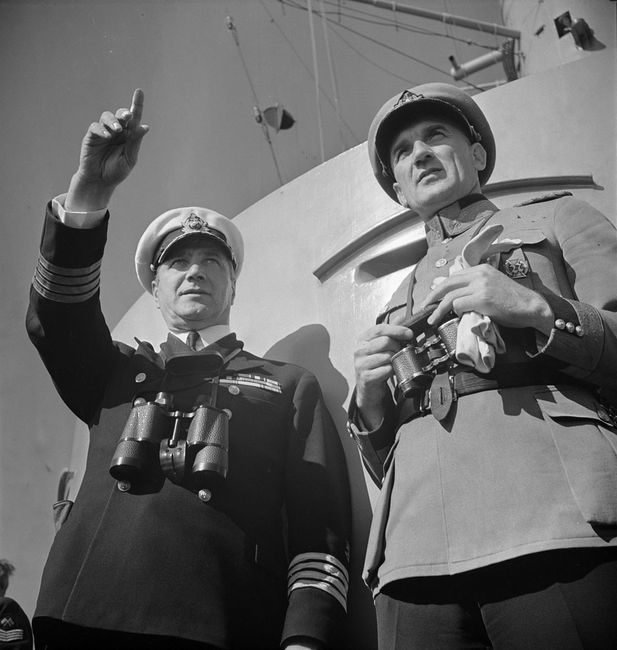
Eero Rahola (left)

Eero Rahola (15 January 1897 – 22 May 1975) was a Finnish Counter admiral and civil servant.

Eero Rahola was born in Mänttä. He participated in the Finnish Civil War on the side of the Whites and took part in the Battle of Helsinki. Subsequently, he fought in the Estonian War of Independence. Between 1919 and 1921 he was stationed as a Finnish officer in Italy, where he also served three months aboard the Italian cruiser Francesco Ferruccio. He stayed in Italy and studied at the Italian Naval Academy; he graduated in 1925. Upon his return to Finland he served as a naval officer in several high positions. Between 1936 and 1940, i.e. also during the Winter War, he was commander of the coastal navy, and commander of the Finnish Navy 1940–1945, i.e. also during the Continuation War. In 1943 he was promoted to Counter admiral. He resigned in 1945 and was 1945-1964 head of the Finnish Maritime Administration. He died in Helsinki, aged 78.
