= Tom Sukanen =

Canadian shipbuilder (1878–1943)

Tom Sukanen (born Tomi Jaanus Alankola; 1878 – April 23, 1943), was a Finnish-born Canadian sailor. He immigrated to Minnesota at the age of twenty, where he married and became a farmer. In 1911, he left his wife and farm and walked to Saskatchewan, where his brother Svante Sukanen was living. Tom then began a homestead in the Macrorie area and farmed there for seven years. Returning to Minnesota, he found that his wife had died, their children living in foster homes, and their farm abandoned. He attempted to bring his son back to Saskatchewan, but the boy was turned back at the Canada–US border. In 1929, at the height of the Great Depression, he made a laborious return voyage to Finland for a visit. Upon his return, he set to building a sea vessel to facilitate his permanent repatriation to his homeland.

== Cultural legacy ==
Sukanen has been the inspiration for a number of plays and artworks. Ken Mitchell's play The Shipbuilder is based on Sukanen's story, as is Andreas Schroeder's novel Dustship Glory. The 2009 film Sisu: The Death of Tom Sukanen, written and directed by Chrystene R. Ells, and the 1985 short film Shipbuilder by Stephen Surjik, are both retellings of his story. He is the namesake of the Sukanen Ship Pioneer Village and Museum.
