= Kolho =

Village in Mänttä-Vilppula, Finland

Coordinates: 62°08′N 24°31′E

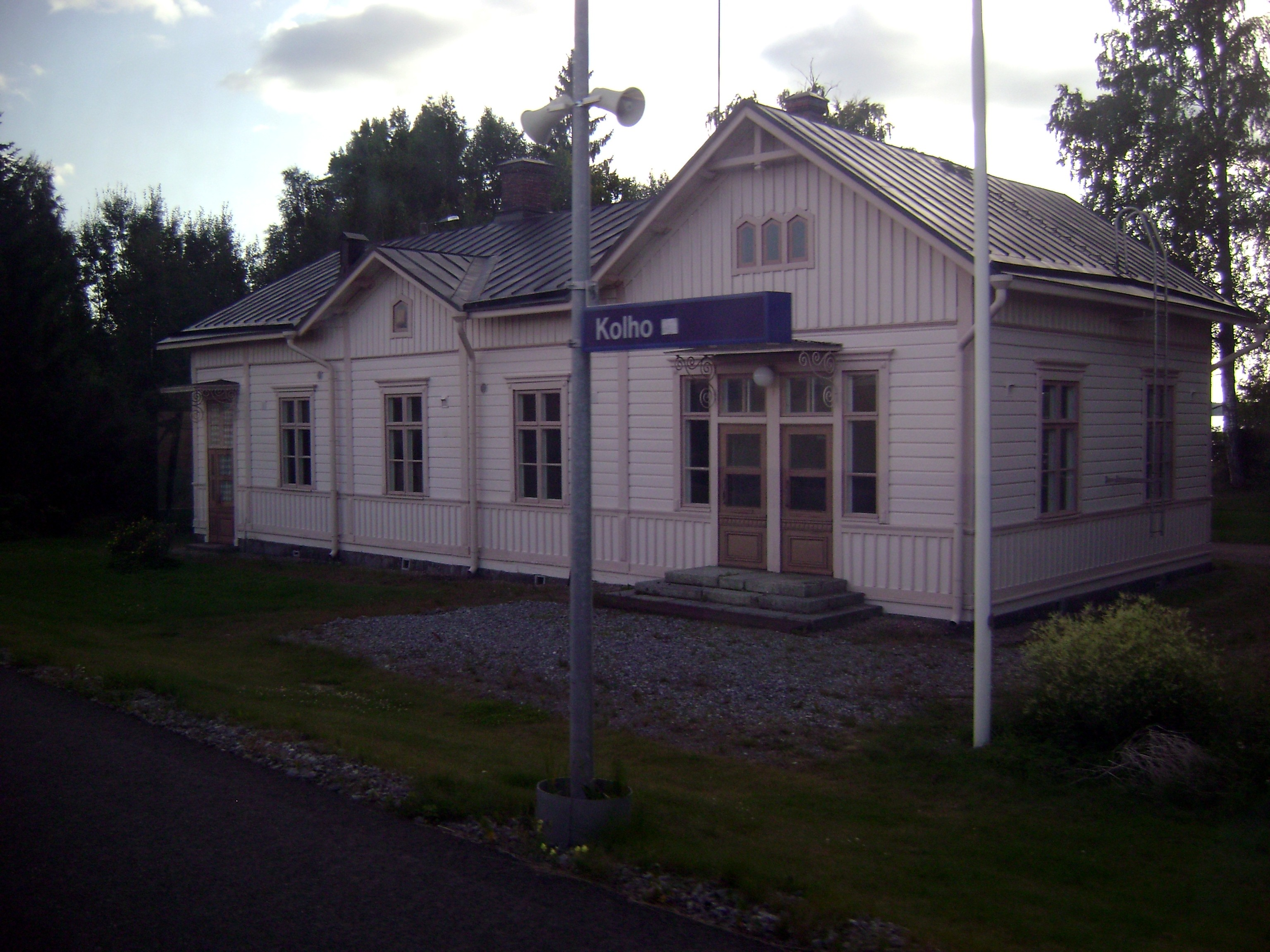
Kolho railway station

Kolho is a village in the city-municipality of Mänttä-Vilppula in Finland. It is located along the Tampere–Haapamäki Line, where Kolho railway station is located.

During the Finnish Civil War, in winter 1918, the Finnish air force used Kolho as a base. Kolho has influenced a number of Finnish artists ranging from Eero Järnefelt, Akseli Gallen-Kallela to Pentti Saarikoski and also was the site of the worst church boat accident in Finnish history.

The Bonn Family Mausoleum

Kolho played a role in the rise of the Finnish paper industry together with the neighbouring Mänttä community, and among the notable figures in Kolho's industry was the industrialist Matthias Bonn (1853–1927). More recently Kolho is known for its natural environment and is a summer resort destination.

James Vehko (aka Jalmari Vehkomäki), the designer of the first Ford's metallic automobile chassis, was originally from Kolho.
