= Mänttä =

Former Town

Coordinates: 62°01′45″N 24°37′25″E

Location of Mänttä in Finland

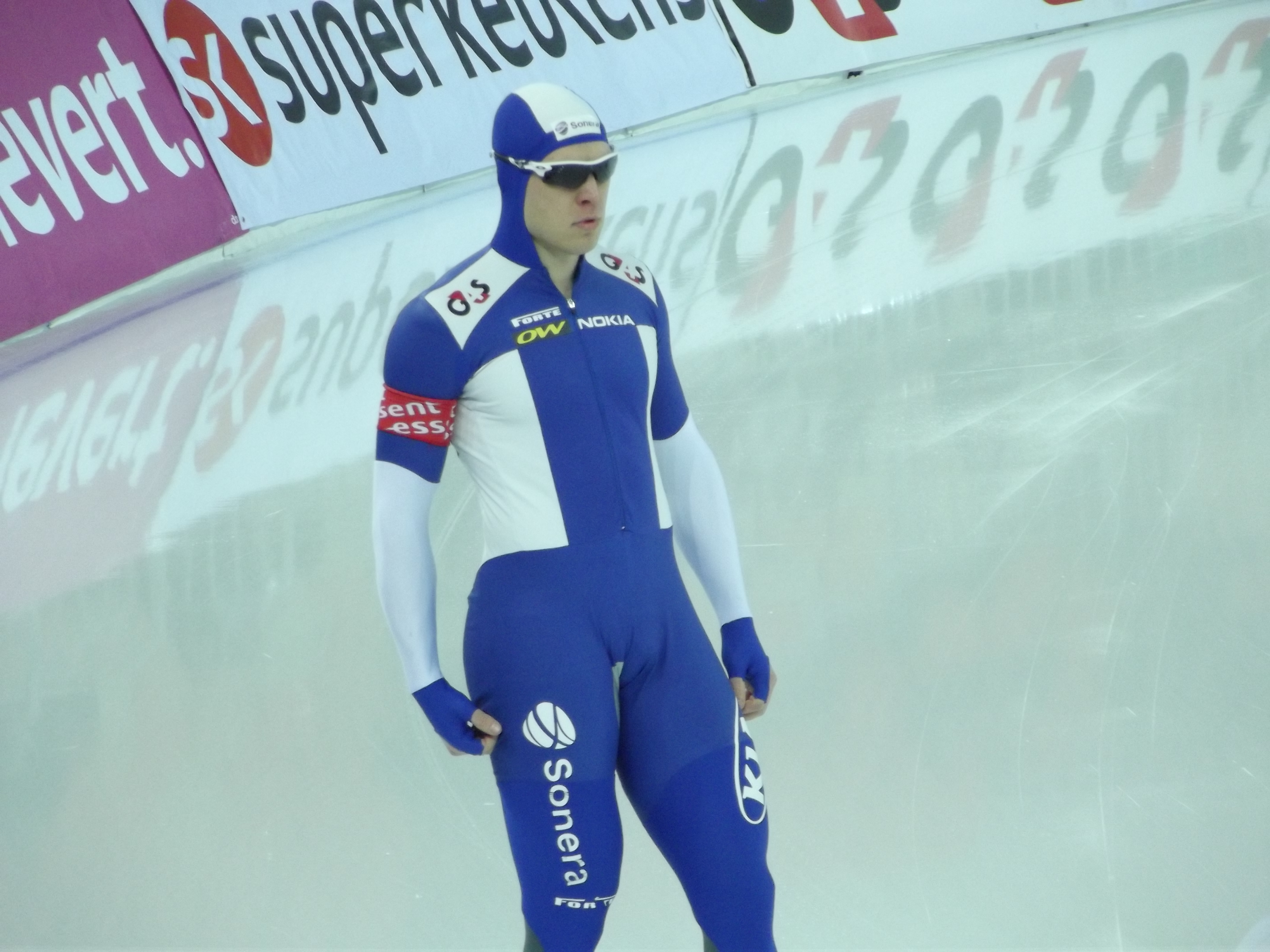
Speed skater Pekka Koskela

Mänttä is a former town and municipality of Finland. It was merged with the municipality of Vilppula to form Mänttä-Vilppula on 1 January 2009.

The place name Mänttä comes from an old house which Tuomas Niilonpoika Mäntsä (1570–1618) founded in Keuruskoski in the wilderness of Sääksmäki.

It was located in the province of Western Finland and was part of the Pirkanmaa region. The municipality had a population of 6341 in 2008 and covered an area of 85.84 square kilometres (33.14 sq mi) of which 21.61 square kilometres (8.34 sq mi) was water. The population density was 100.0 inhabitants per km^{2}.

The municipality was unilingually Finnish.

Finnish naval officer Eero Rahola was born in Mänttä, as well as World Speed Skating Championships medalist Pekka Koskela.

== Twin towns – sister cities ==
Mänttä is twinned with:

- Stary Oskol, Russia
