= Vilppula =

Former municipality of Finland

Coordinates: 62°01′20″N 24°30′35″E

Location of Vilppula in Finland

Vilppula was a former municipality of Finland. Neighbouring Mänttä was merged into it on 1 January 2009 to form the municipality of Mänttä-Vilppula. The municipality was unilingually Finnish.

It was located in the province of Western Finland and was part of the Pirkanmaa region. The municipality had a population of 5,457 in 2005 and covered an area of 571.26 km^{2} of which 99.90 km^{2} was water. The population density was 10.5 inhabitants per km^{2}. The work force mainly consisted of industry and service, these accounting for 50 and 39 percent of total workforce. Population was estimated to be at a slight decline.

The Kolho village in Vilppula is located to the north. Another village, Pohjaslahti, is located northwest from the Vilppula centre. These continue to exist as villages of the new Mänttä-Vilppula municipality.

Vilppula is also known for being the location of the 1918 Battle of Vilppula during the Finnish Civil War.
