= Usko Nyström =

Finnish architect and lecturer at Helsinki University of Technology

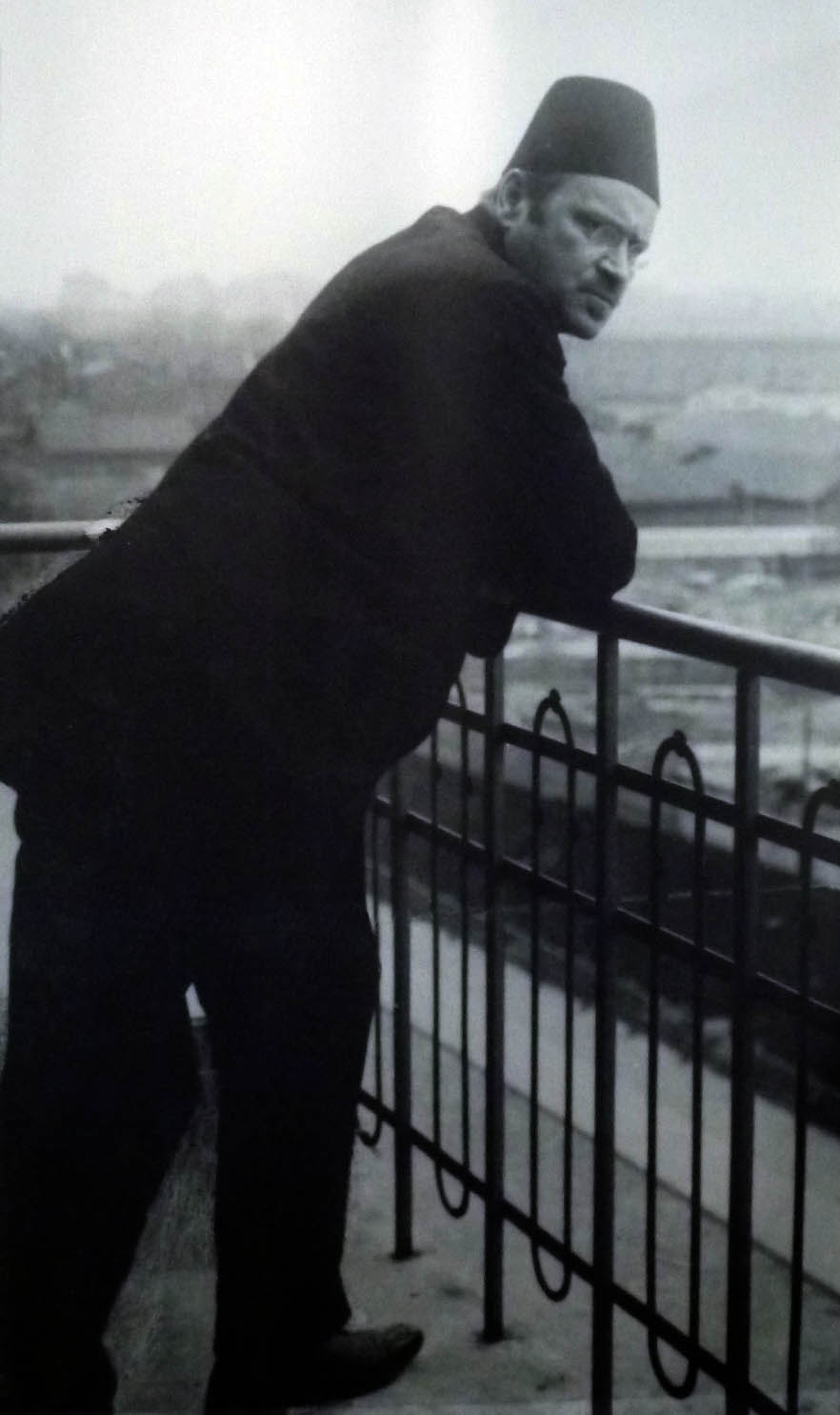
- Born: Zachris Usko Nyström; 6 September 1861; Virrat, Finland
- Died: 6 January 1925 (aged 63); Kotka, Finland
- Occupation: Architect
- Practice: Arkkitehtitoimisto Usko Nyström─Petrelius─Penttilä
- Buildings: Grand Hôtel Cascade, Imatra; Schalin apartment building, Helsinki; Mielikki apartment building, Helsinki; Lammi Church restoration
- Projects: Vyborg City Hall

Zachris Usko Nyström, known as Usko Nyström, (6 September 1861 – 6 January 1925) was a Finnish architect and one of the most influential professors of architecture at Helsinki University of Technology; among his students were later notable architects Eliel Saarinen and Alvar Aalto. One of the pioneering architects of the early Art Nouveau or Jugendstil style in Finland at the end of the 19th and beginning of the 20th century, he continued to influence generations of students by introducing them to the style. Many of his key architectural works were made while he was in the architectural partnership Usko Nyström─Petrelius─Penttilä which operated from 1895 to 1908. His most famous work is the Grand Hôtel Cascade (1903) (nowadays known as the Imatran Valtionhotelli) in Imatra.

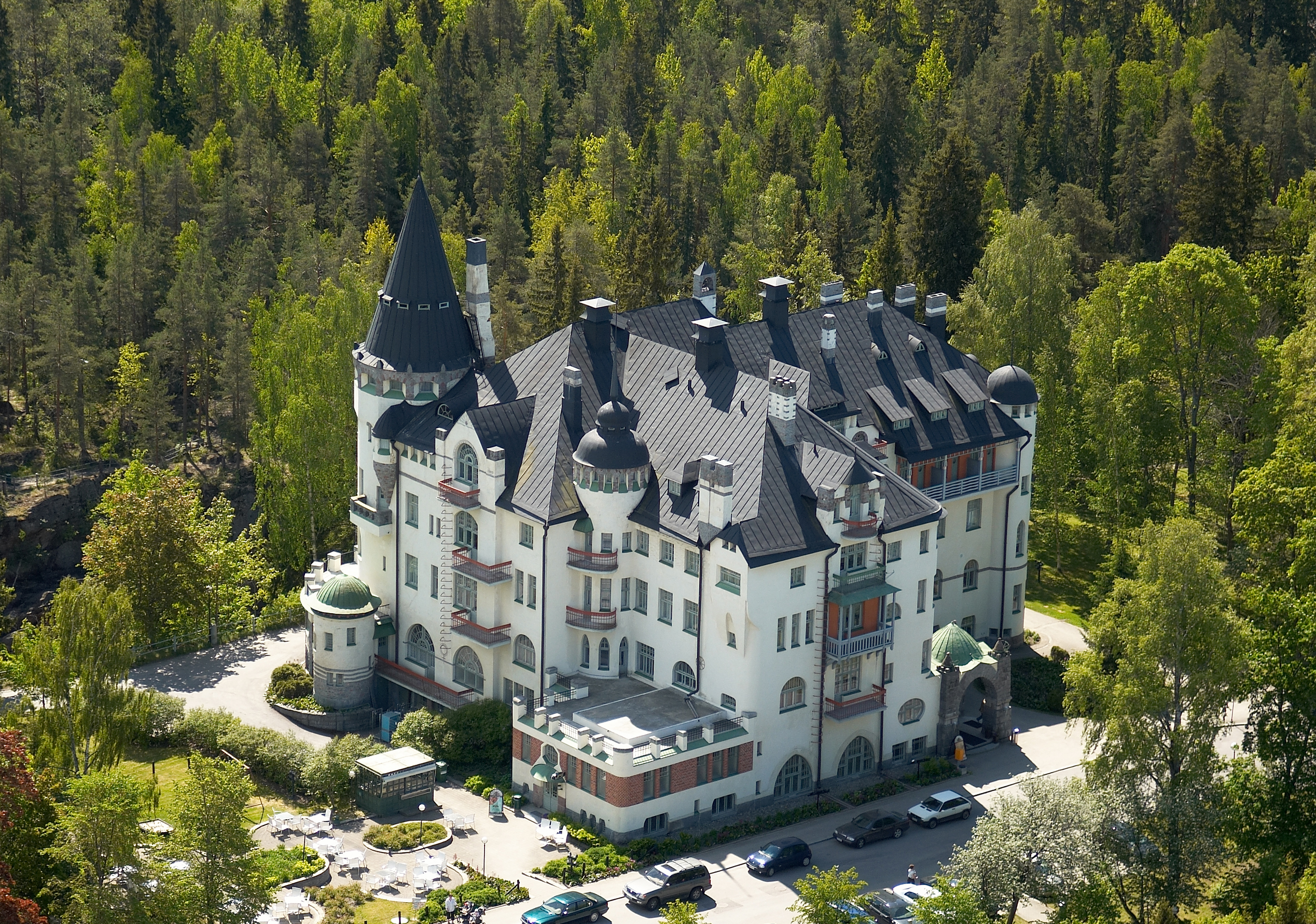
Grand Hôtel Cascade (1903) (nowadays the Imatran Valtionhotelli) Imatra.

== Life and career ==
Usko Nyström was born in Virrat, Finland, at a time when Finland was a Grand Duchy under the rule of Russia. His parents were Johan Abraham Nyström, a civil servant, and Clara Chalotta Nyström (née Vikman). There were several children in the family. Nyström's brother, Konrad into Nyström, is even more well known, as a photographer, writer and translator, under the name I. K. Inha.

Usko Nyström was schooled in the city of Hämeenlinna before going on in 1880 to study first mathematics and then "humanities", among other things aesthetics, at the Imperial Alexander University of Finland (the precursor to the present-day University of Helsinki). However, in 1885 he switched to studying architecture at the Polytechnic Institute in Helsinki, graduating in 1888. While still studying he worked first for architect Josef Stenbäck (a notable designer of churches) and then architect Gustav Nyström (no relation), who was also professor of architecture at the Polytechnic Institute. He achieved some success almost immediately on graduating, winning the competition for the design of the pedestal for the memorial bust to commemorate the architect Carl Ludwig Engel – but it was never realised.

In 1890 Nyström won a state grant to travel and study abroad, studying at the École des Beaux-Arts in Paris in 1890–91, and travelling throughout Europe. He travelled to Italy and Greece, exploring the ancient architecture, as well as around France and to England, where he was particularly interested in the medieval church architecture. During his time abroad he kept detailed notebooks and sketchbooks (nowadays held in the Museum of Finnish Architecture archives). In 1892, soon after returning to Finland, he was appointed assistant lecturer at the Polytechnic Institute (founded 1879), where he himself had previously been a student, a position he held for the rest of his life, and where the head of the school at the time was Gustaf Nyström. He was a highly skilled draftsman and his talent was used first in teaching linear and free-hand drawing. In 1901 he was promoted to lecturer in architecture, teaching ancient and medieval architecture and their styles, along with exercises in design and drawing. For many years Nyström also taught ornamentation and style history at the Central School of Applied Arts in Helsinki (precursor to the present-day Aalto University School of Arts, Design and Architecture). He received the honorary title of professor in 1922. It has often been noted by his former students how very popular he was as a teacher, in part due to his keen sense of humour but also in conveying something of his drawing skills to the students. He also had a significant role in spreading the Art Nouveau style to several generations of students.

Nyström never married. He died suddenly on 6 January 1925 in Kotka, while visiting his sister. He is buried in Hietaniemi cemetery in Helsinki. In 1928 the Finnish Association of Architects arranged a competition for the design of Nyström's gravestone: it was won by his former student, Alvar Aalto; the gravestone, in white marble, with the text Bene latuit from French philosopher René Descartes's work Meditations, where he had quoted Ovid, Bene vixit qui bene latuit, i.e. The one who lives well, lives unnoticed.

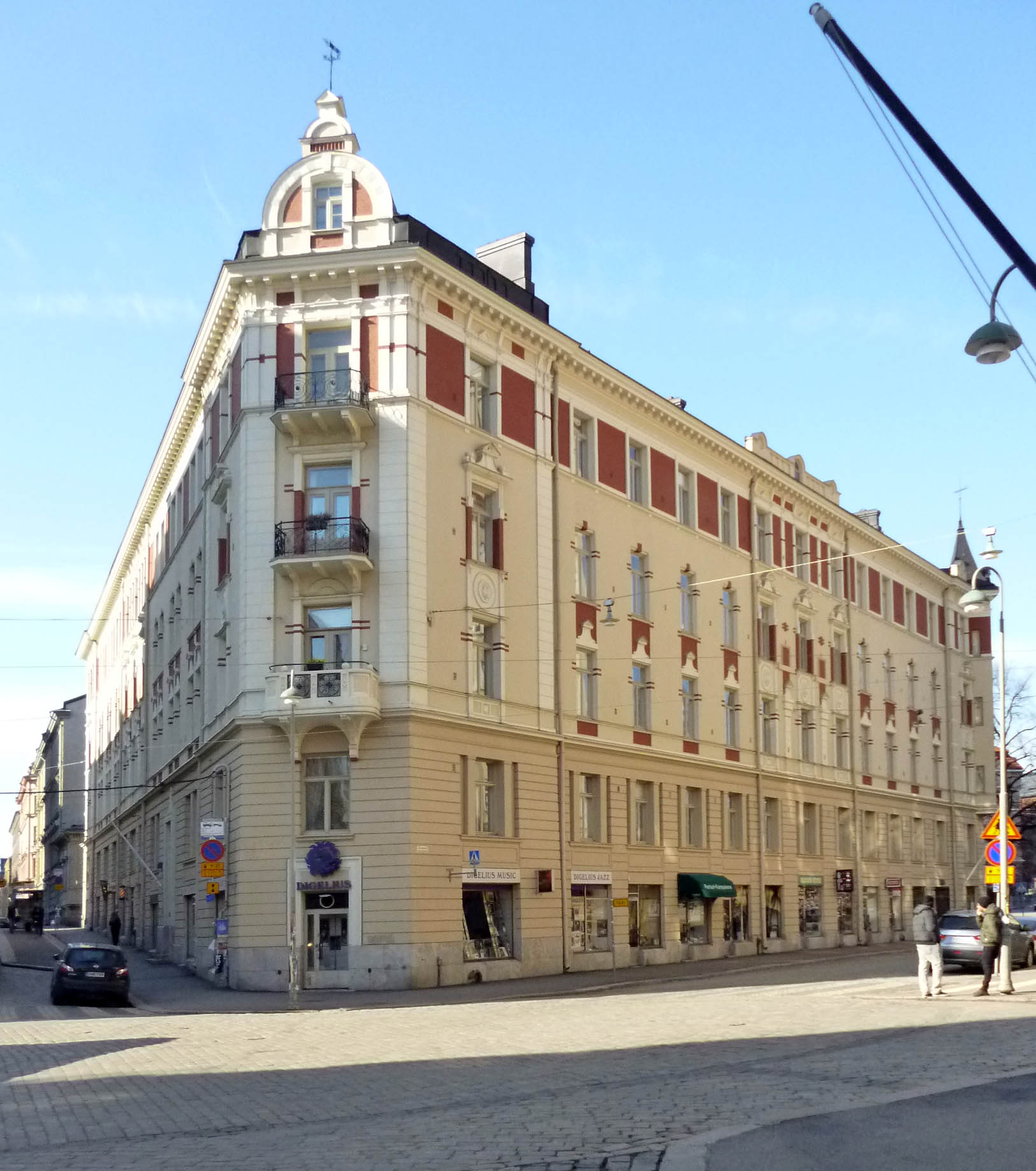
"Neo-Renaissance" Wuorinen apartment building, Helsinki (1896)

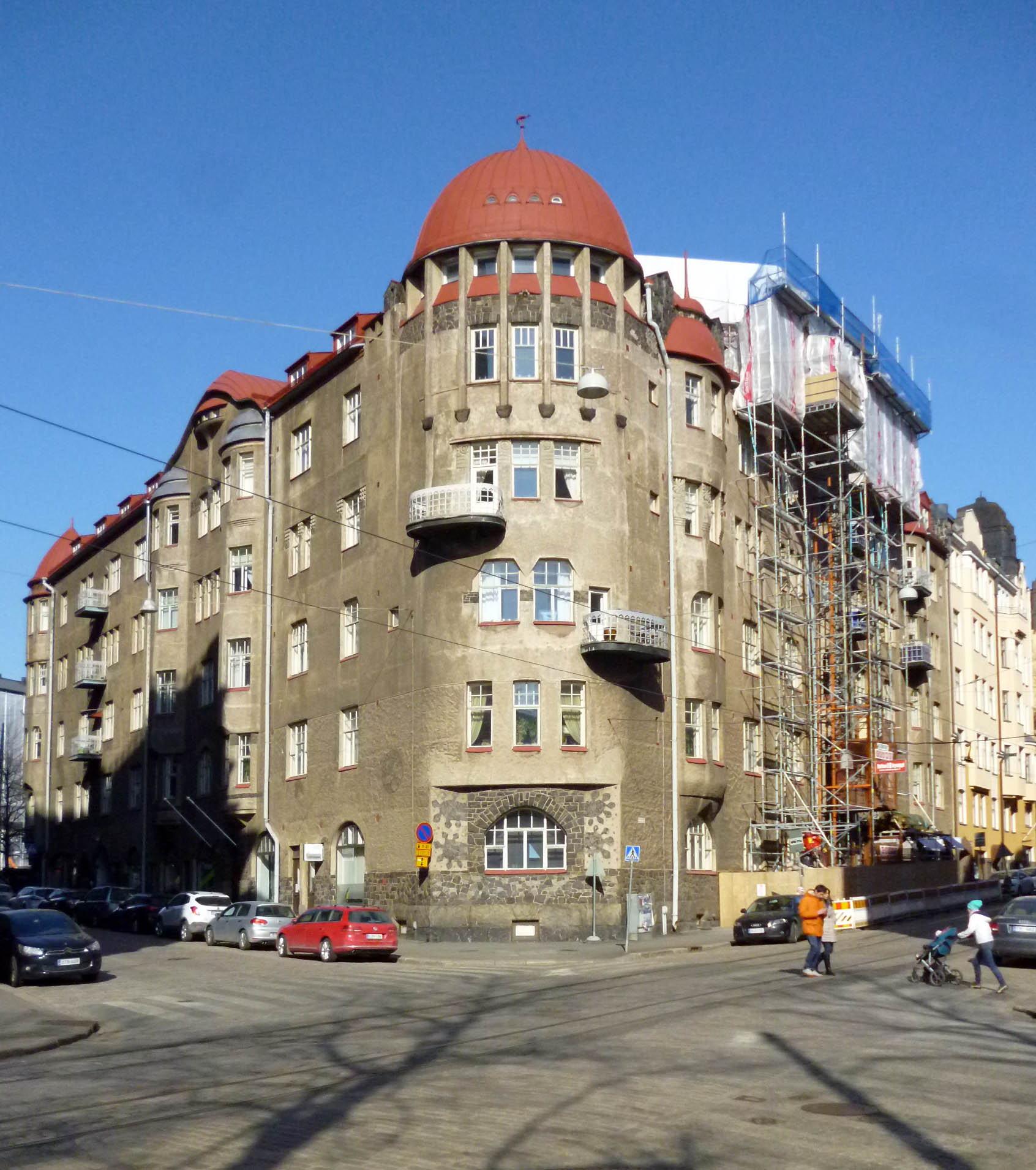
Street view

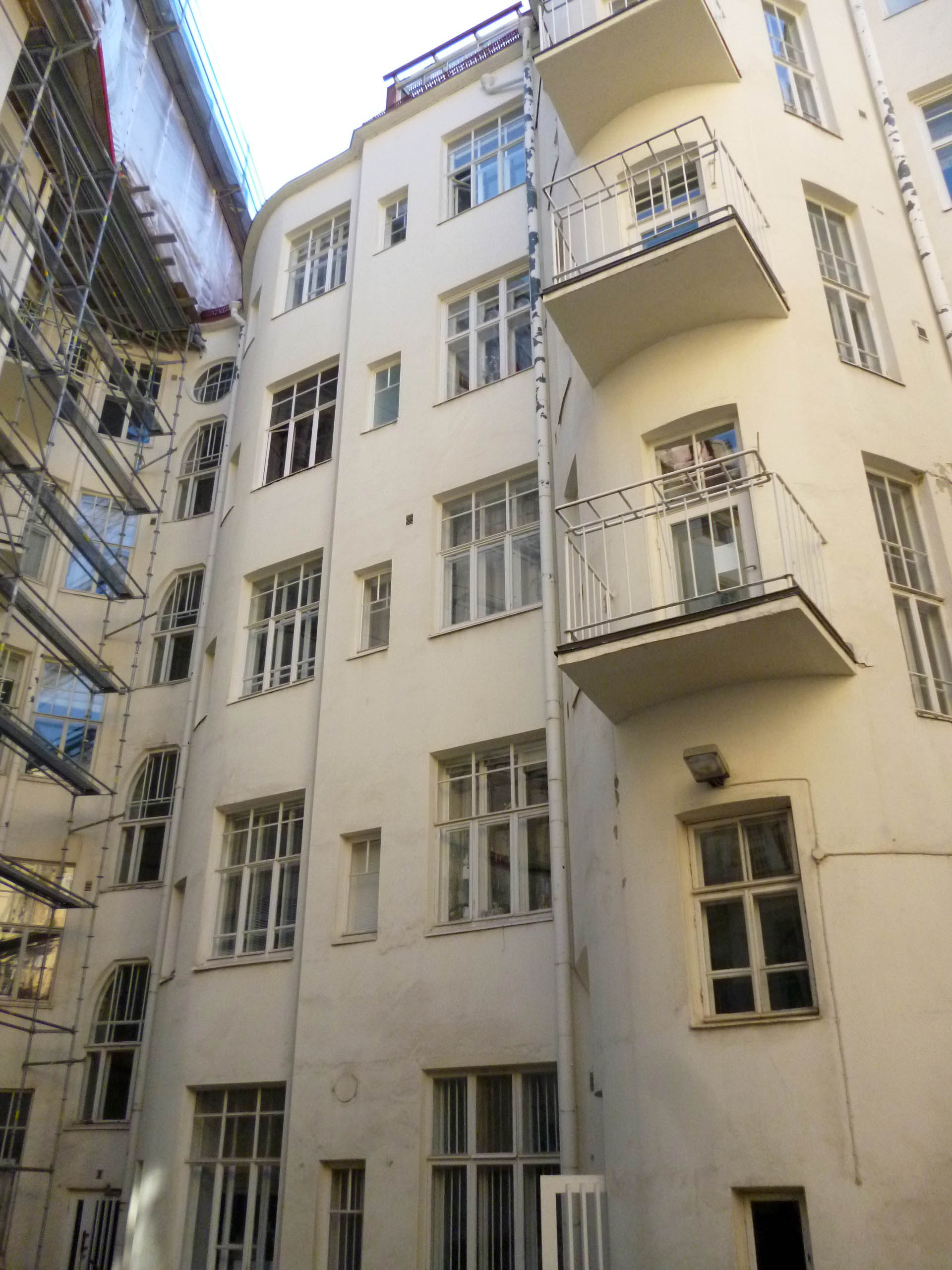
"White" courtyard.

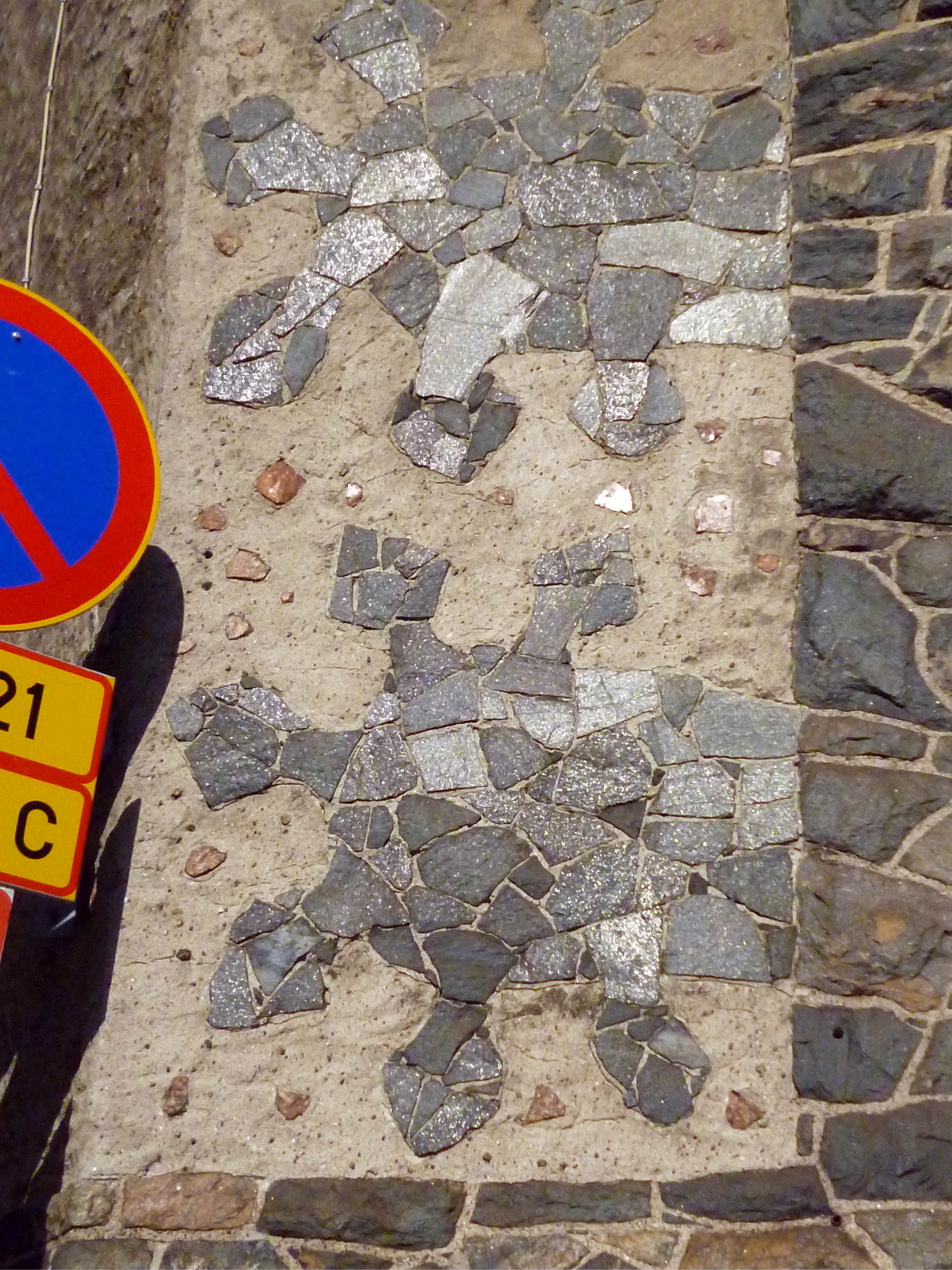
"Seaweed" decoration on the street facade.

"Jugendstil" Schalin building, Kapteeninkatu 11 – Tehtaankatu 9, Helsinki (1902)

Nyström had contributed to the journal Suomen Teollisuuslehti (Finnish Industrial Magazine) edited by his architecture partner Vilho Penttilä. However, his most significant written contributions were to the 11-volume encyclopaedia Tietosanakirja published between 1909 and 1922. Nyström wrote the descriptions for almost 300 entries.

== Architectural firm Usko Nyström─Petrelius─Penttilä ==
Usko Nystöm established a joint architectural form with Albert Petrelius (1865–1946) and Vilho Penttilä (1868–1918) in 1895 and the partnership continued until 1908. The office was one of many joint architectural firms established in Helsinki at around that time – Gesellius, Lindgren, and Saarinen becoming the most renowned. Each of the partners had at one time worked for the master builder J. G. Rosenberg. Nyström was the leading figure in the architectural firm – only his first name was included in its official name. Albert Petrelius was both an architect and master builder and as well as being a partner in the architectural form also simultaneously worked for a fire insurance company, while the architect Vilho Penttilä was also editor-in-chief of the journal Suomen Teollisuuslehti (Finnish Industrial Magazine), and which provided an outlet for showing the works of the architectural firm. Petrelius and Penttilä were members of the pro-Finnish language and pro-Independence Fennoman movement (at that time the vast majority of architects were Swedish-speaking). In fact, some of the architectural firm's customers were also connected with the Fennoman movement, in particular the KOP Bank (Kansallis-Osake-Pankki).

Among the most notable works of Usko Nyström─Petrelius─Penttilä were 18 bourgeois apartment buildings in central Helsinki, designed and built between 1895 and 1907. Helsinki was going through a building boom period at that time, aided by the Companies Act of 1895 and new forms of credit institutions, at a time when industry in the cities was on the rise and there was a shortage of housing. The style of their architecture represents the period of transition from neo-gothic and neo-renaissance to the Jugendstil or Art Nouveau style, also referred to as the National Romantic style. Historian Eija Rauske suggests that models for the designs of the apartment blocks came from the major cities of central Europe, and in particular Paris and Vienna. An idea of the transitional style of the architectural firm can be seen by comparing two apartment blocks, both fairly close to each other in central Helsinki. The Wuorinen apartment building is a 5-storey (plus attic storey) neo-Renaissance style building taking up an entire city block, with heavily rusticated ground floor (containing shops) and heavy roof cornice; the finesse of the facades is supposedly picked out in the exposed brickwork on the upper floors and plaster-cast emblems of various forms, in particular the letter W, referring to the client of the project. By contrast, the Schalin apartment building at Kapteeninkatu 11 – Tehtaankatu 9, Helsinki (1902), is a 5-storey (plus attic storey) Jugendstil or Art Nouveau work, in unpainted rough render decorated with patterns depicting seaweed made from granite insets. The corner dome has echoes of medieval castle towers. The façade also includes seemingly randomly placed decorative balconies. The curved forms continue partly in the interior with some oval-shaped rooms. However, the rear internal courtyard is far more restrained and rational, and painted in white.

Nyström's most famous work was designed during the period of the partnership – though it is attributed to him alone – the Grand Hôtel Cascade (1903) (nowadays known as the Imatran Valtionhotelli) in Imatra. With its turreted towers, the work brings to mind the castles in France Nyström had seen during his travels there a decade earlier.

In fact, the first building designs of Usko Nyström─Petrelius─Penttilä were wooden buildings, designed in a rustic, proto-National Romantic style. Penttilä even campaigned for a Finnish National Romantic style of architecture on the pages of the journal he edited, Suomen Teollisuuslehti, with the designs showing exposed notched corner joints, rather than covering the logs with boarding, which had been the custom at that time. Among their distinct wooden buildings were the Hollola Municipal House (1902), the Suviranta artists' home for artist Eero Järnefelt, in Tuusulanjärvi, along the same lake shore where other artists would build their atelier homes, most notably Jean Sibelius. By far the largest scale project of the architectural firm was never realised, the Vyborg City Hall, which Nyström and Penttilä had won in an architectural competition in 1899. Their entry is in the neo-Gothic style. However, over the following years, as the project awaited the go-ahead, the design changed to a more neo-Renaissance style. The project was never built.

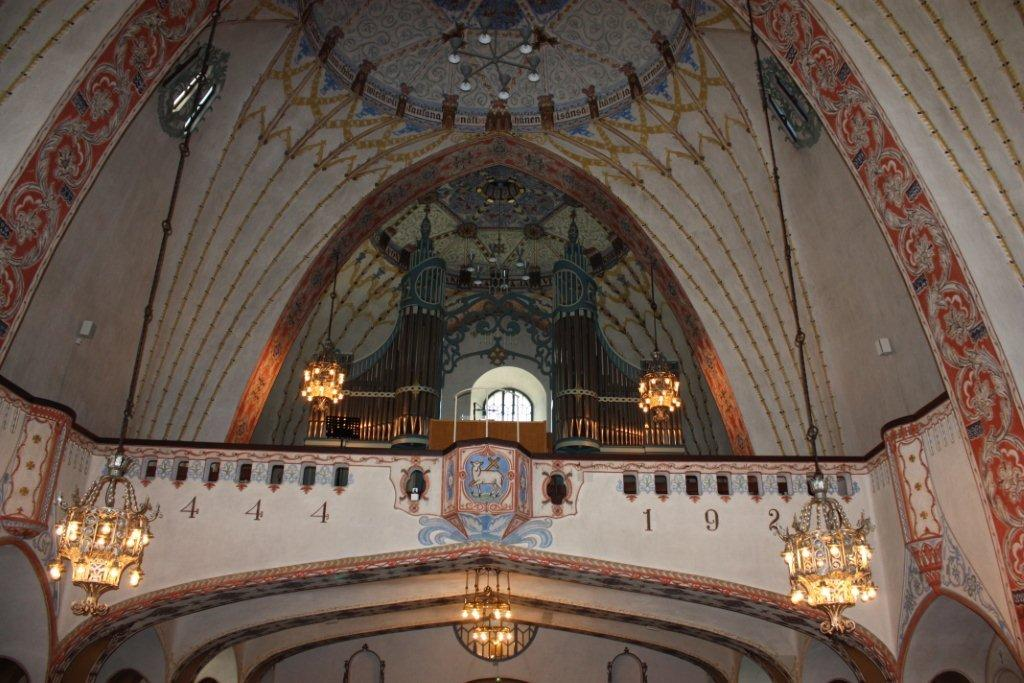
Interior, Lammi Church (1918–1929)

In total the firm employed 15 people, and as a teacher at the school of architecture Nyström was able to hire talented students. Among their staff who went on to have distinguished careers were Emil Werner von Essen, Kauno Kallio, Kalle Kontio, Väinö Keinänen, Clas Axel Gylden and Uno Ullberg. After the joint architectural firm was disbanded, each of the architects continued individually, but with Penttilä continuing with their main clients, that is, the banks.

Following the break up of the Usko Nyström─Petrelius─Penttilä Nyström continued to teach, but also worked on a number of architectural projects of his own. His former architect partner Vilho Penttilä was killed during the Finnish Civil War of 1918. The medieval Lammi Church was burnt down during the war – and afterwards Nyström was awarded the commission for its restoration and reconstruction. Historian Rauske even calls the fire a "blessing in disguise". While the main outer granite walls had mostly been preserved, Nyström devoted his creativity to a completely new interior using reinforced concrete to create new vaults, which while inspired by medieval church architecture have a more modern feel, a colourful example of Art Nouveau but also in a fluidity that has affinities with Expressionism which was already at its height at that time in central Europe. The work was finally completed in 1929, after Nyström's death.

== Selection of works by Usko Nyström ==
- Villa, Enäjärvi Lake, Sammatti (1895)
- West-Finland school, Aino Voipion tie 30, Huittinen (1895)
- Uudenmaankatu 17 apartment building, Helsinki (1898)
- "Vanhakartano" manor house, Kirkkokankaantie, Pori (1902)
- Schalin apartment building, Kapteeninkatu 11 – Tehtaankatu 9, Helsinki (1902)
- Virrat cemetery chapel, Virrat (1902)
- Grand Hôtel Cascade (nowadays the Imatran Valtionhotelli), Imatra (1903)
- Wuorinen apartment building, Helsinki
- Suviranta atelier home for artist Eero Järnefeltin, Tuusulanjärvi, Järvenpää (1901)
- Städet apartment building, Meritullinkatu 9, Helsinki (1905)
- Mielikki apartment building, Kapteeninkatu 20–22, Helsinki (1906)
- Vilhola apartment building, Vilhonkatu 9, Helsinki (1907)
- Kointähti apartment building, Pietarinkatu 9, Helsinki (1907)
- Kotirinne apartment building, Pohjois Rautatiekatu 11 – Nervanderinkatu 1 – Ainonkatu 4, Helsinki (1911)
- Cygnaeus School, Pori (1912)
- Lammi Church restoration (1918–1929)
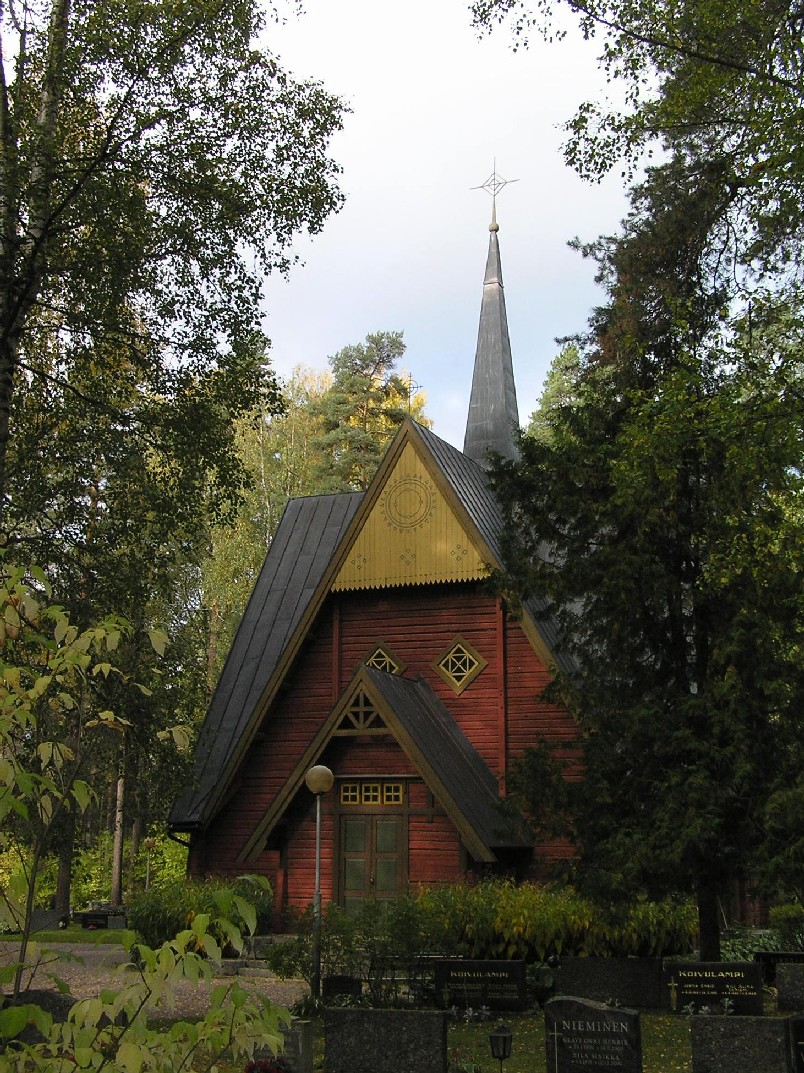
Virrat cemetery chapel, Virrat (1902)

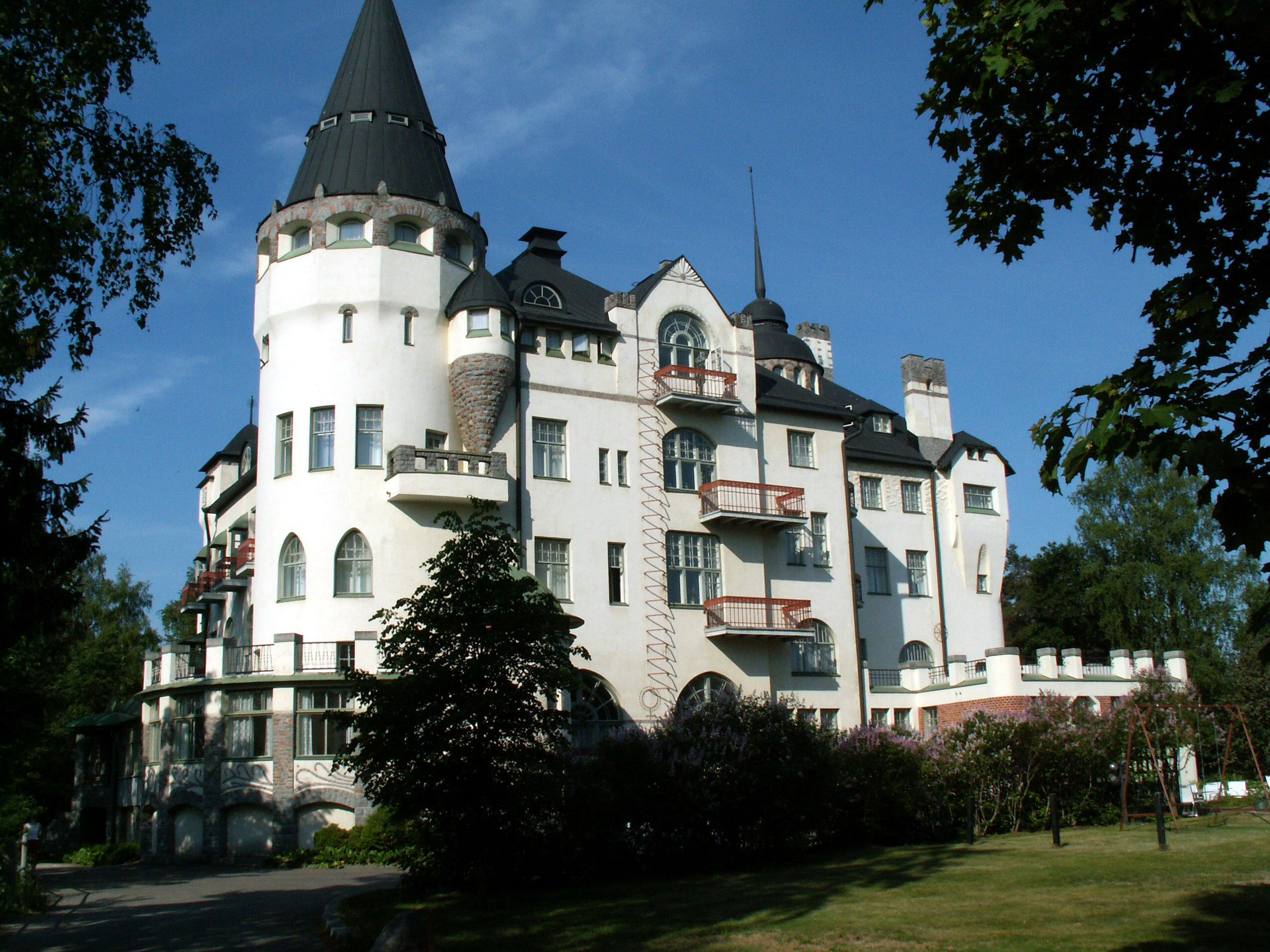
Grand Hôtel Cascade (nowadays Imatran Valtionhotelli) Imatra (1903)

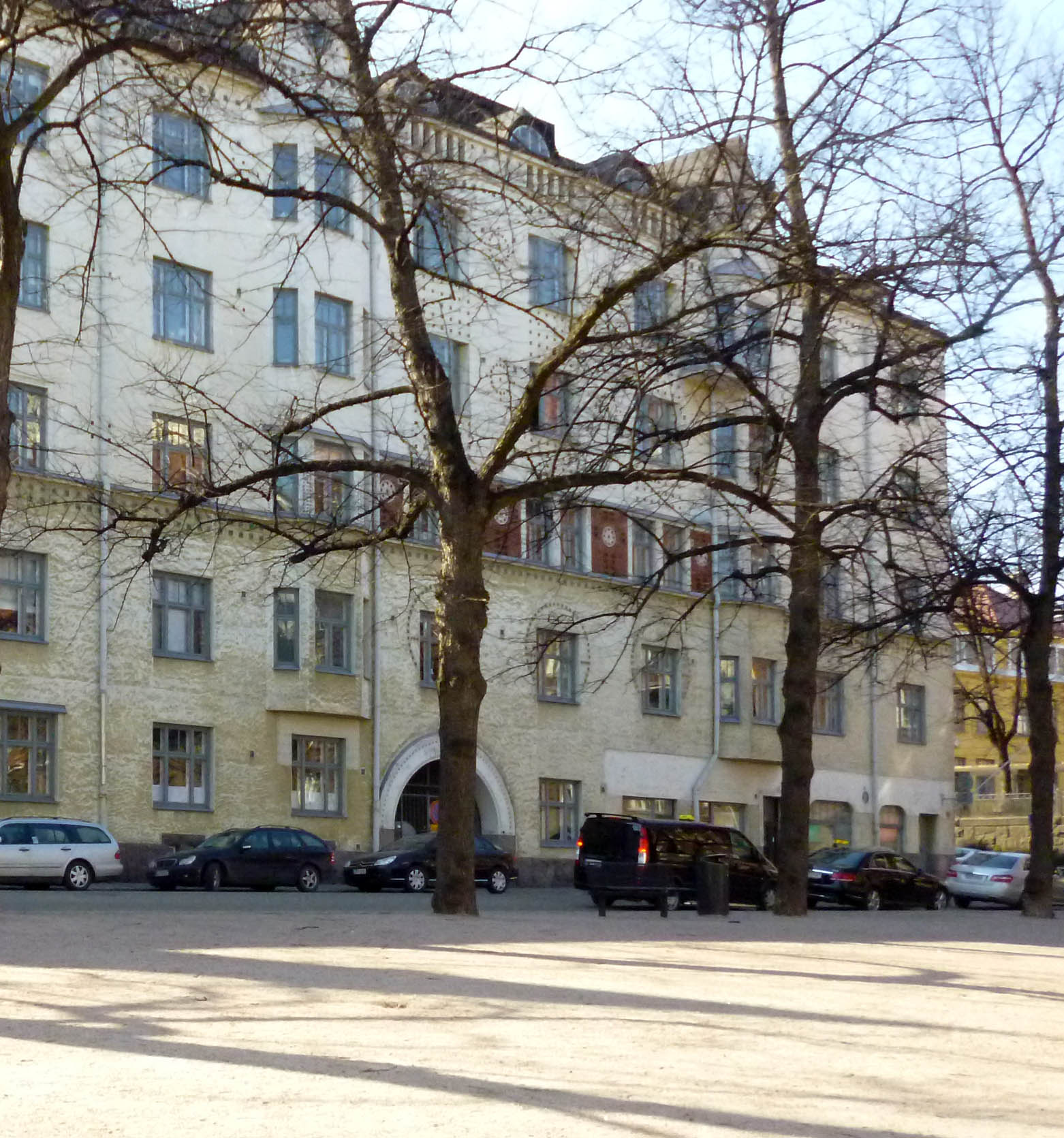
Mielikki apartment building, Helsinki (1906)

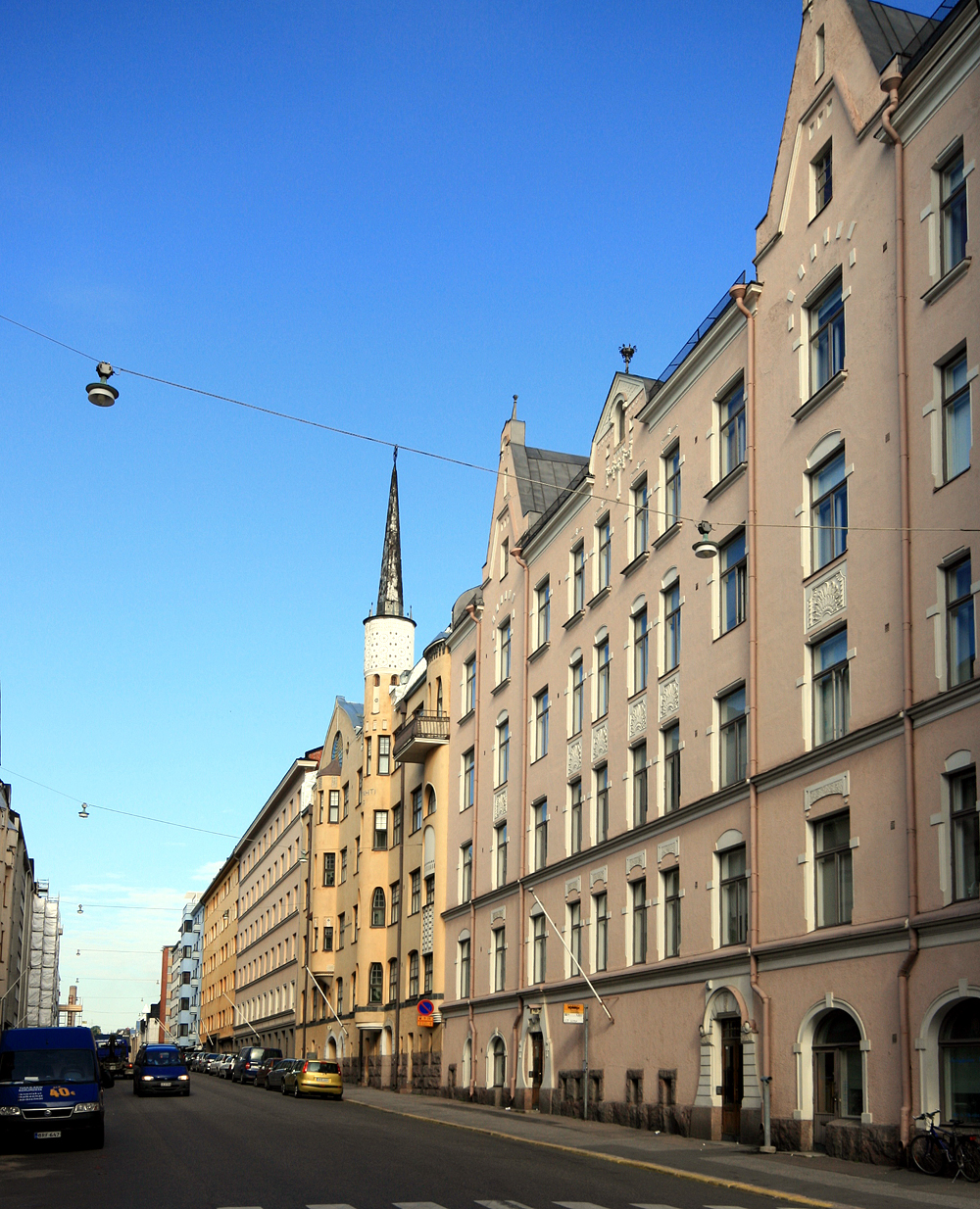
(centre) Kointähti apartment building, Helsinki (1907)

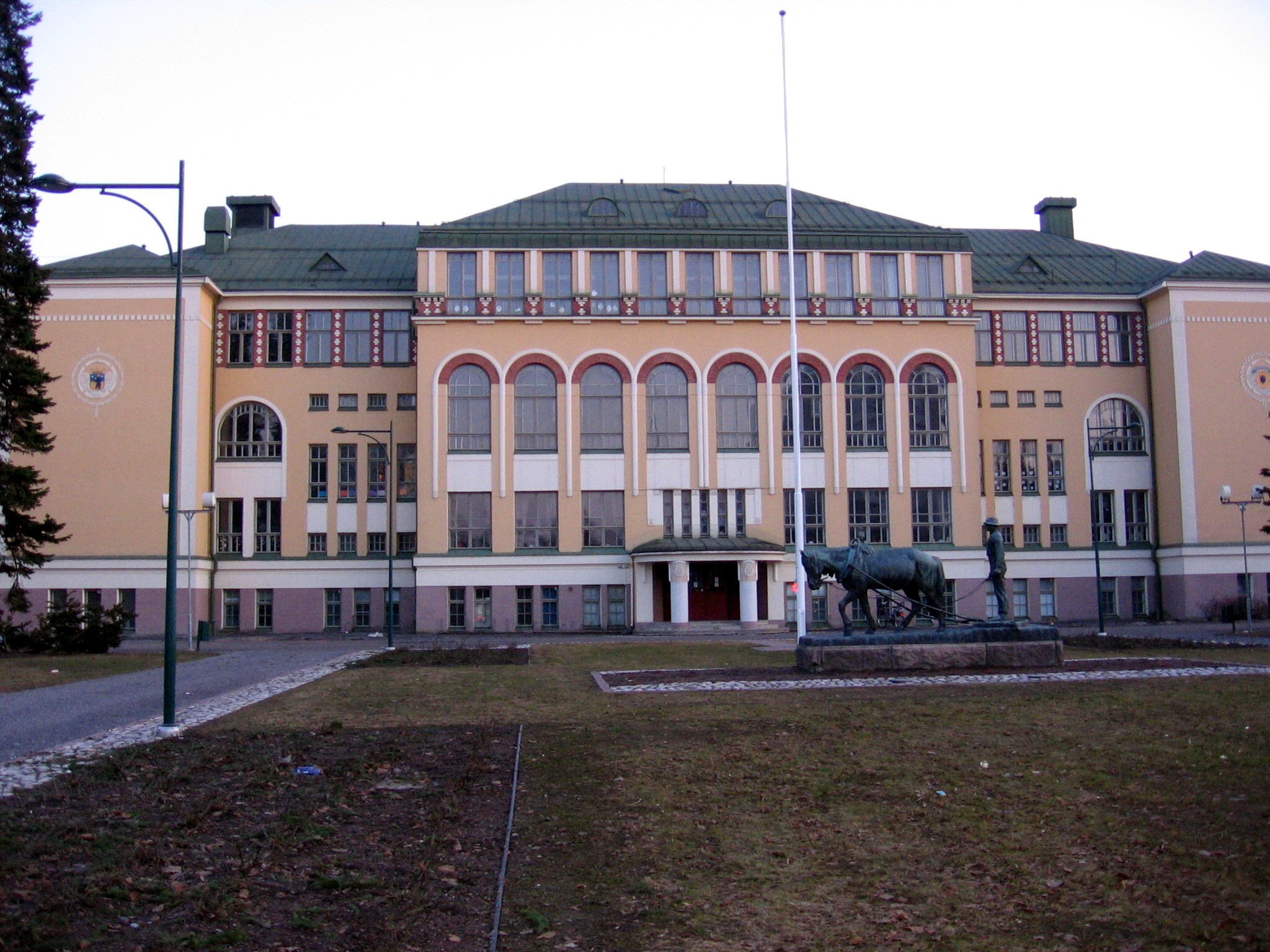
Cygnaeus School, Pori (1912)

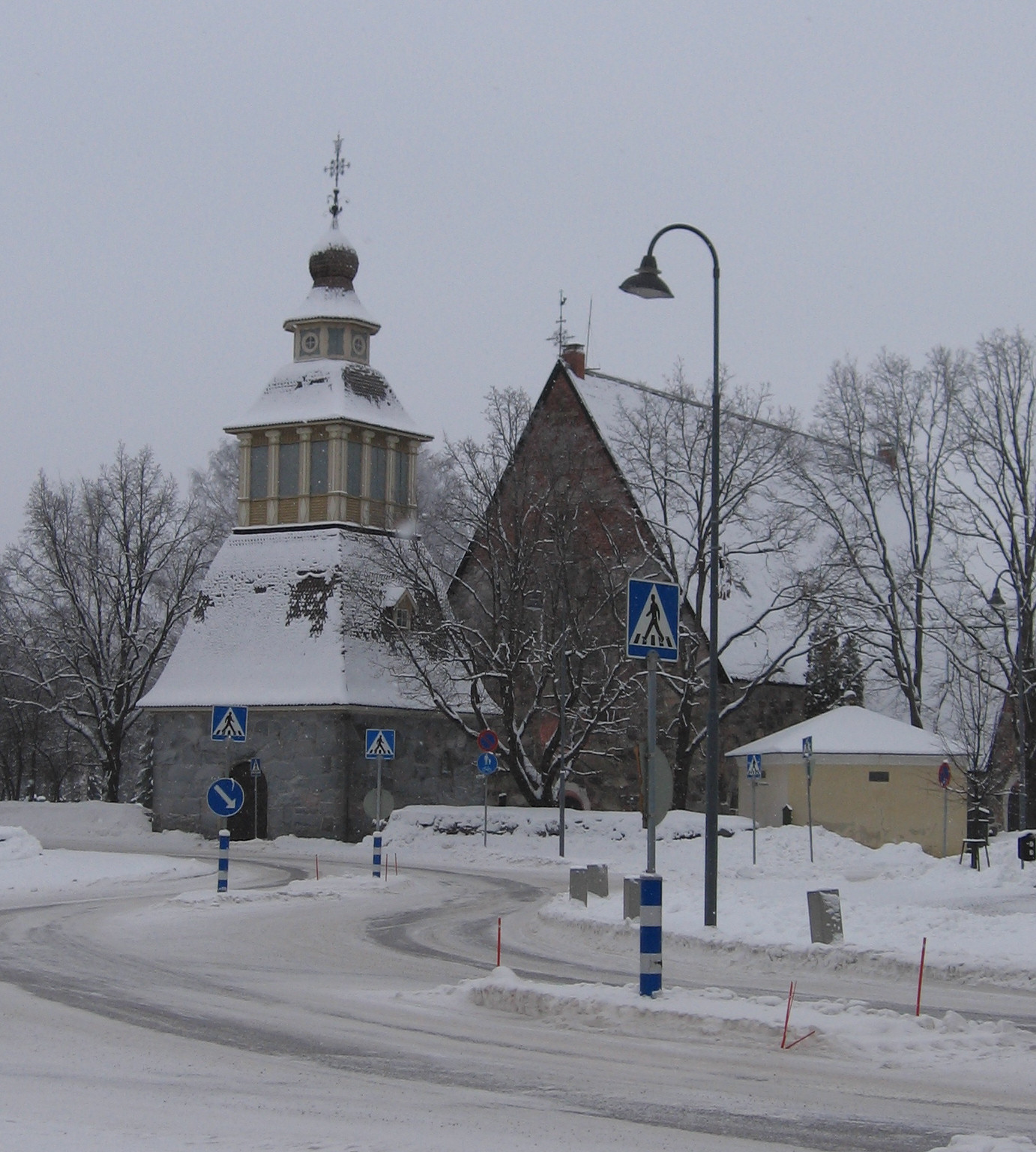
Lammi Church restoration (1918-1929)

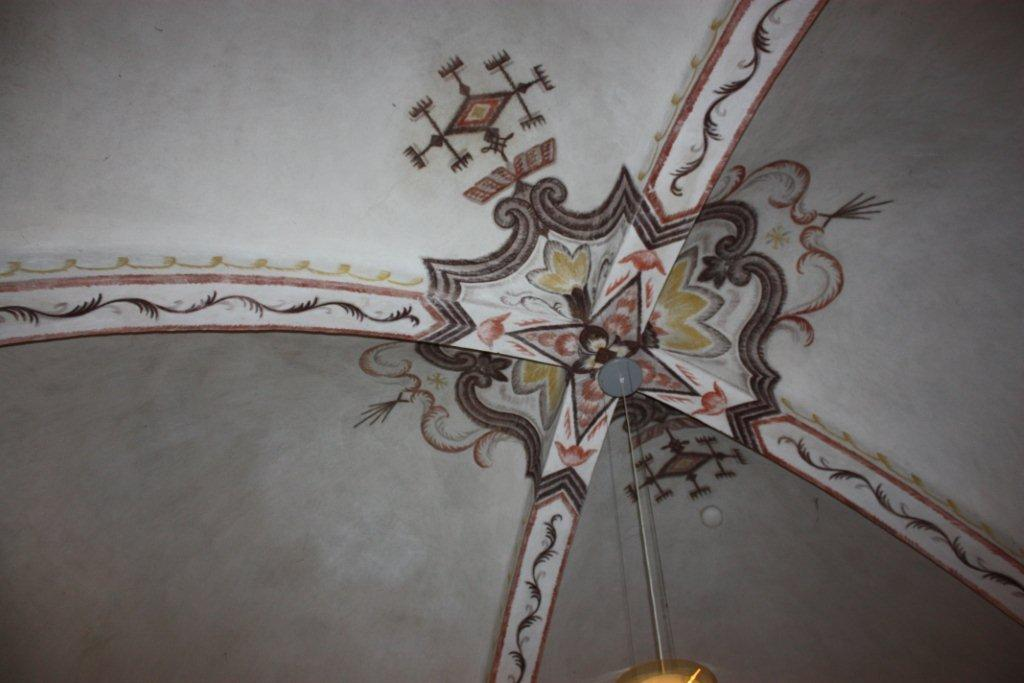
Detail, Lammi Church restoration (1918-1929)

== Selection of works by Usko Nyström-Petrelius-Penttilä ==
- Wuorinen apartment building, Fredrikinkatu 19 – Merimiehenkatu 6, Helsinki (1896)
- Vyborg Town Hall, Vyborg (nowadays in Russia) (1899 competition victory, redesigned up until 1920, never realised)
- Apartment building, Uudenmaankatu 9, Helsinki (1900)
- Kansallis-Osake-Pankki bank building, Kirkkokatu 6 – Pakkahuoneenkatu 11, Oulu (1900, demolished 1960)
- Savonlinna Tourist Hotel, Savonlinna (1901)
- Hollola Municipal House (1902)
- Kansallis-Osake-Pankki bank building, Torkkelinkatu 8, Vyborg (1901)
- Kataja apartment building, Kauppiaankatu 2, Katajanokka, Helsinki (1902)
- Apartment building, Kristianinkatu 1, Kruununhaka, Helsinki (1902)
- Apartment building, Oikokatu 13, Kruununhaka, Helsinki (1903)
- Kotka Finnish School (nowadays the Arcus building of Kotka Lyceum High School) (1905)
- Pohjolan Pirtti pavilion, Lammassaari, Helsinki (1905)
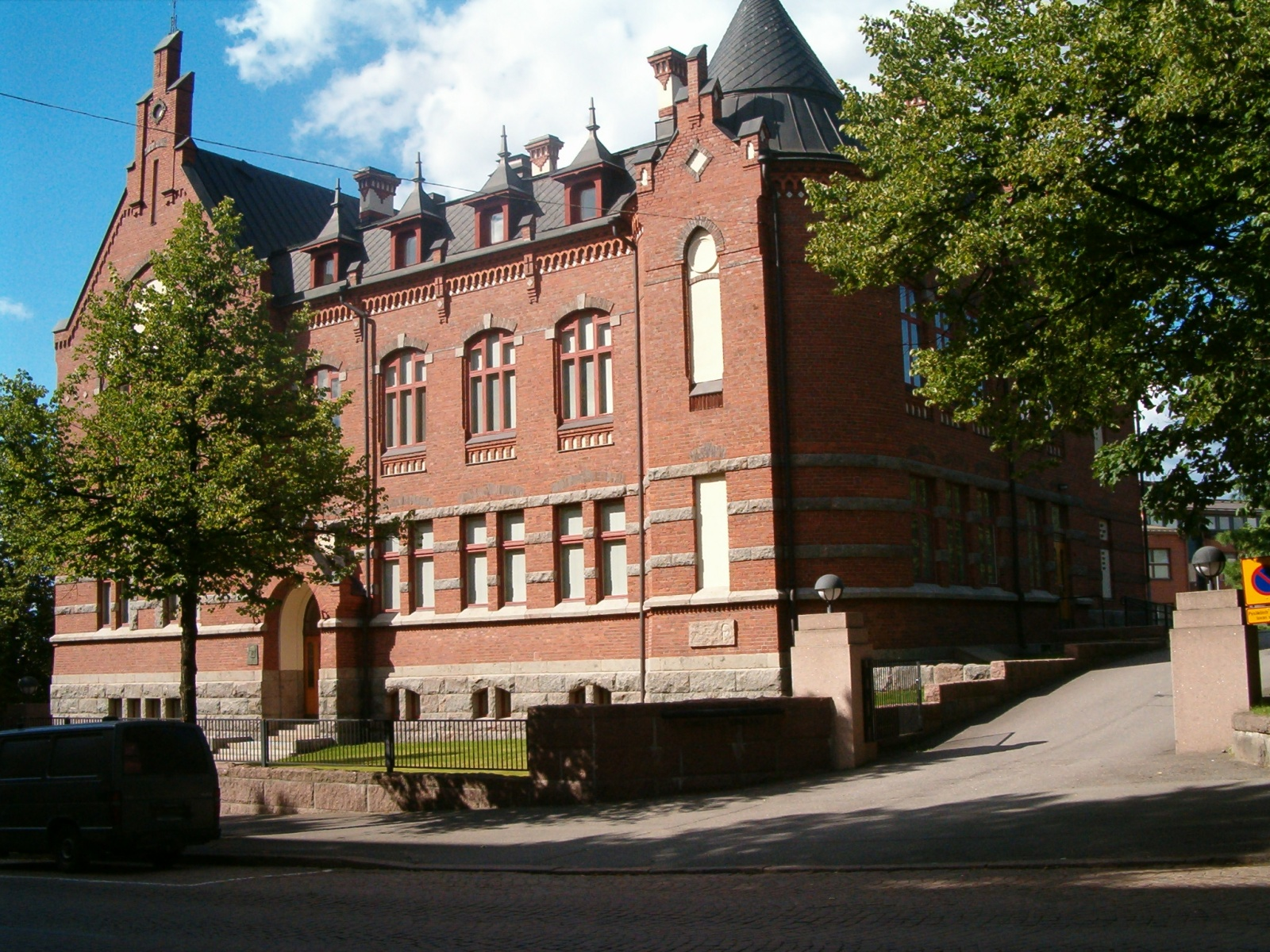
Lahti co-educational school, Lahti (1899)

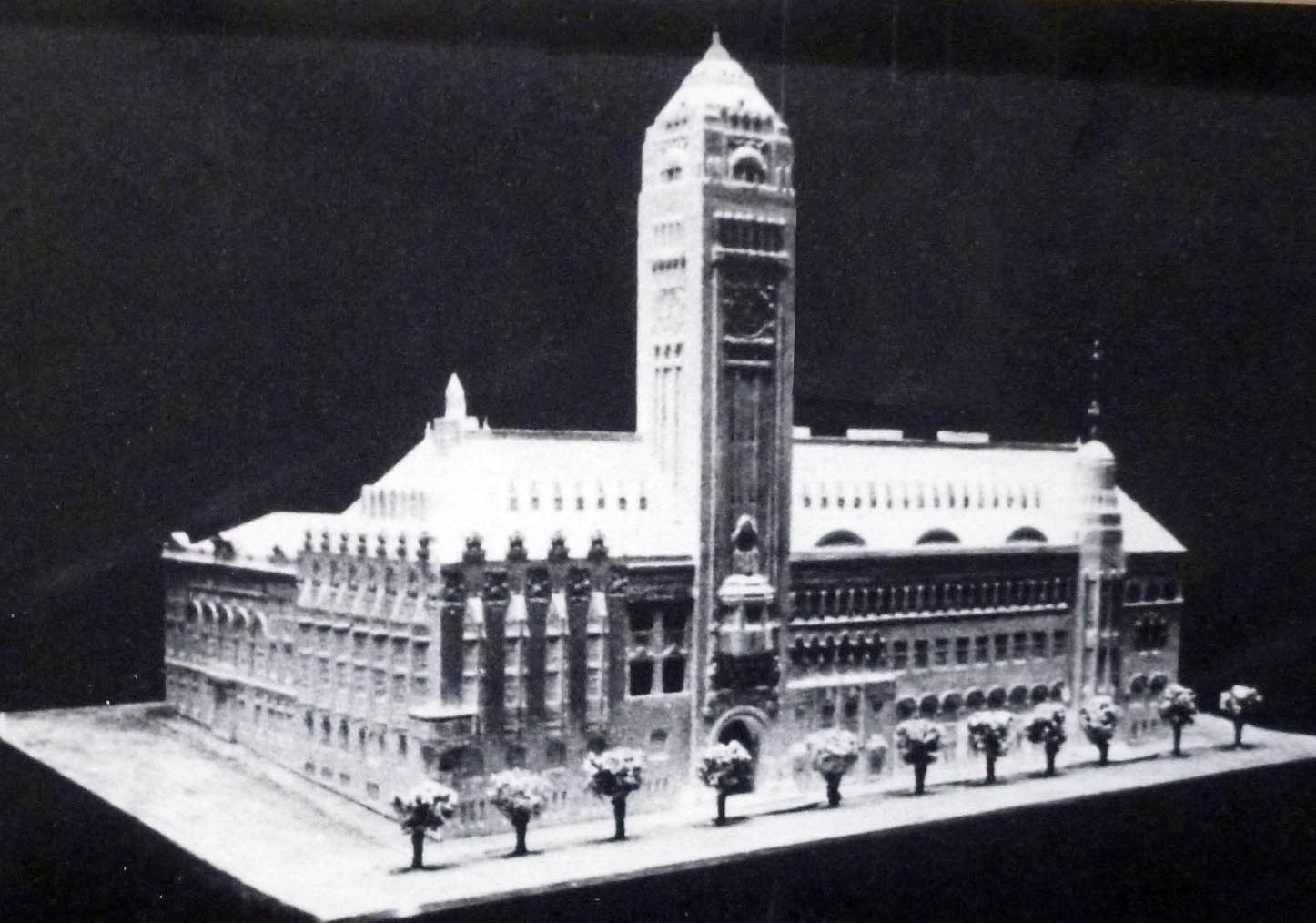
Vyborg City Hall, model (1899)

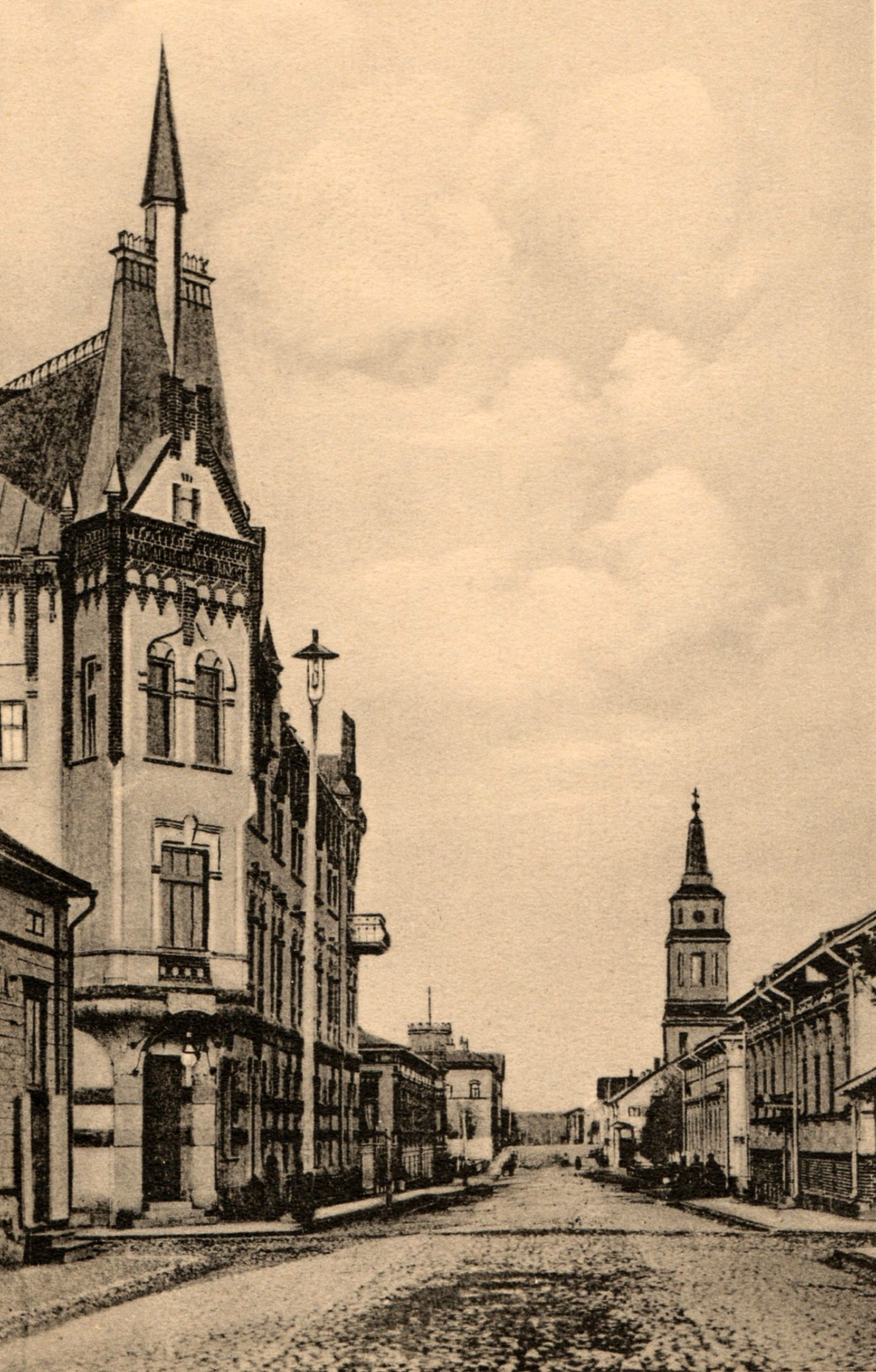
KOP Bank building (left), Oulu (1900, demolished 1960)

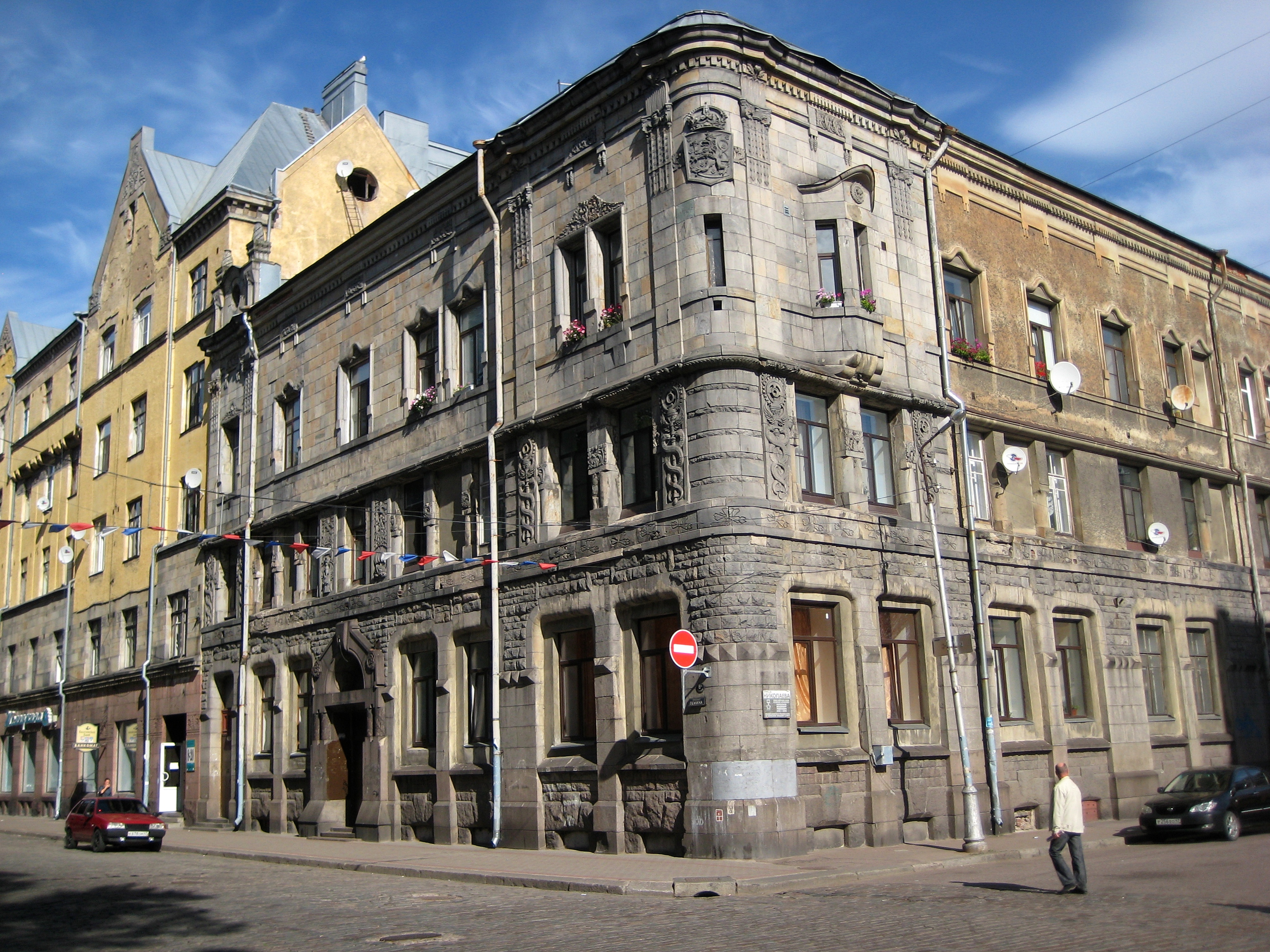
KOP Bank building, Vyborg (1901)

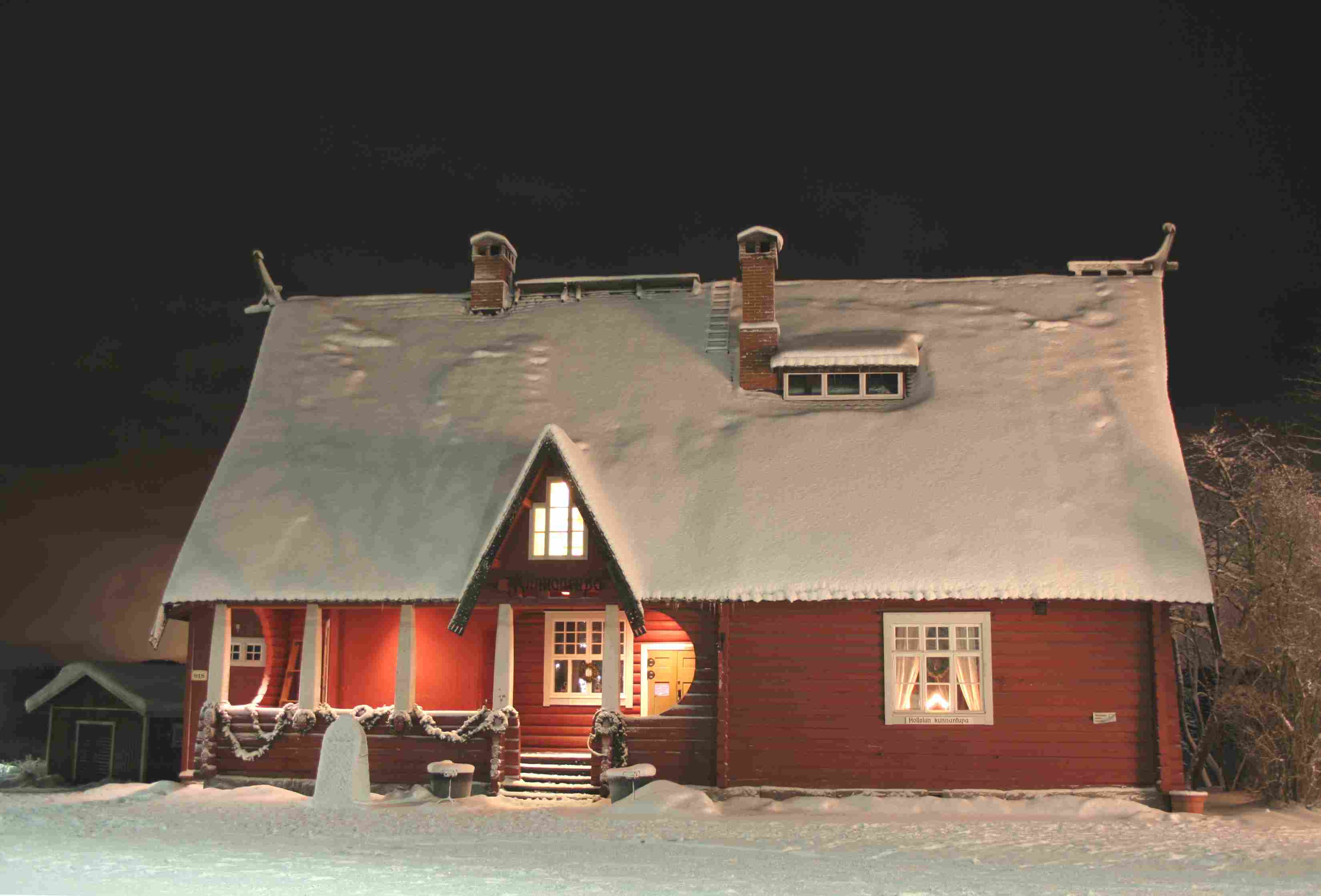
Hollola Municipal House (1902)

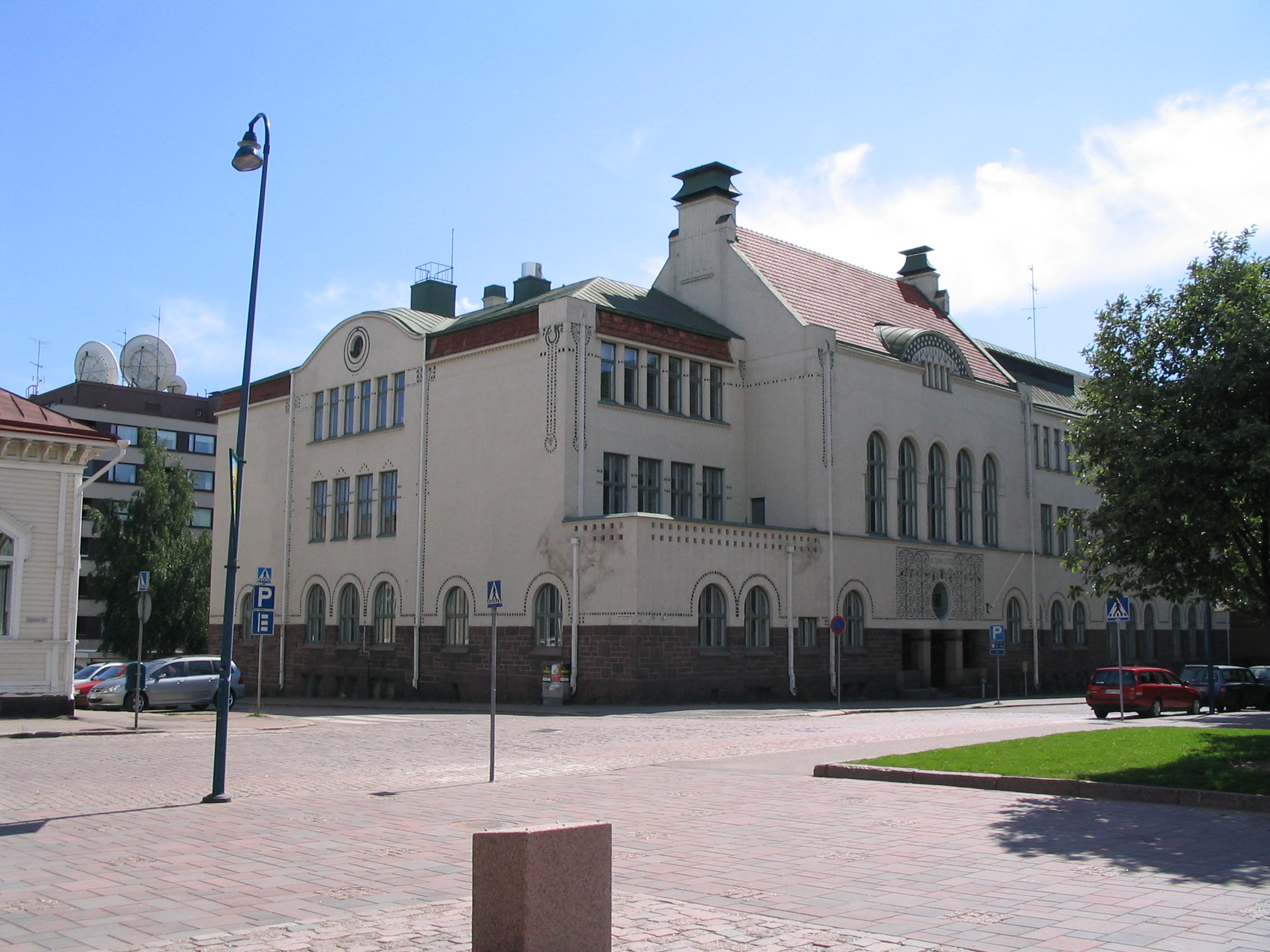
Kotka Finnish School, Kotka (1905)

== Exhibition ==
The careers and works of the three partners of the architectural firm Usko Nyström-Petrelius-Penttilä were the subject of an exhibition held at the Museum of Finnish Architecture, Helsinki, Finland, from 9.4.2014 to 11.5.2014.
