= I. K. Inha =

Finnish photographer, author, translator, and journalist (1865–1930)

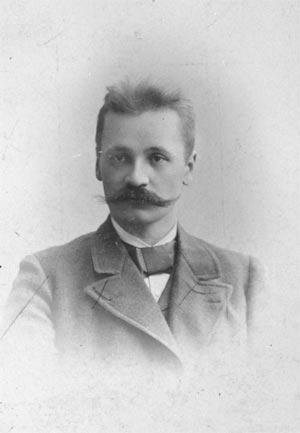
I. K. Inha

I. K. Inha (Into Konrad, born Konrad Into Nyström, November 12, 1865, Virrat – April 3, 1930, Helsinki) was a Finnish photographer, author, translator, and journalist. Inha is considered one of the grandmasters of Finnish photography. Sometimes he is referred to as "the national photographer" of Finland. He is especially known for his documentation of Finnish folk tradition, old habits and customs, and landscapes. In addition to his documentary work he was a significant portrayer of modernisation in the early 20th century.

== Biography ==
Konrad Into Nyström was born in 1865 in the village of Jäähdyspohja in the municipality of Virrat in central Finland. His father was the bailiff Johan Abraham Nyström and his mother was Clara Charlotta Nyström (née Vikman). After Inha's childhood years the family moved to the town of Ikaalinen, and from there Inha moved to Hämeenlinna in 1877 to study in the famous Lyceum of Hämeenlinna. In addition to normal school subjects, Inha studied languages and journalism. He matriculated in 1884 and afterwards moved to Helsinki and enrolled in the University of Helsinki to study first aesthetics, Finnish language, and history, only to change his majors to geology, geography, and chemistry after one year of studies. Inha never graduated but was an avid generalist and was fluent in several languages.

Helsinki remained Inha's hometown for most of his life, but in addition to places he visited on his numerous travels, he spent some years in the villages of Karjalohja and Lohja in southwestern Finland. Inha died at the age of 64 of leukemia in his home in Helsinki. He is buried at the Hietaniemi cemetery in Helsinki.

Konrad Into had twelve siblings: Ilma Nyström, Saima Albertina Nyström, Julian Toivo Nyström, Aina Johanna Nyström, Aleksander Väinö Nyström, Kanutus Onni Nyström, Sakris Usko Nyström, Inha Luciina Nyström, Helma Abrahamina Nyström, Urban Solmu Nyström, Impi Margareta Nyström, and Tyyni Maria Nyström, who was born from J.A. Nyström's second marriage after his first wife had died.

Konrad Into Nyström became Into Konrad Inha in 1887 when he started his public career as a journalist. Inha was the name of his sister (Inha Luciina), who died when Into was three years old in 1869.

== Work and achievements ==
Alongside famous Finnish artists like Jean Sibelius, Juhani Aho, and Eero Järnefelt, Inha was an integral part of the artistic movement what is nowadays called the golden era of Finnish art in the turn of the 20th century.

In 1889 Inha traveled in Europe and studied photography in Germany (in Bad Grönenbach with W. Cronenberg) and Austria (in Vienna at the E. Jaffé and A. Albert atelje). After returning to Finland he spent most of the late 1800s and early 1900s touring the Finnish countryside photographing and documenting the old Finnish way of life that was slowly disappearing due to urbanization and modernization. His travels included several trips to northern and eastern Finland and even a grand tour during which he drove his bicycle through the whole country in 1895. Due to his activity and productivity Inha slowly became the single most significant photographic documentarist of the Finnish landscape and countryside. Most of his negatives have been lost but many of his work were reproduced in several pictorial books.

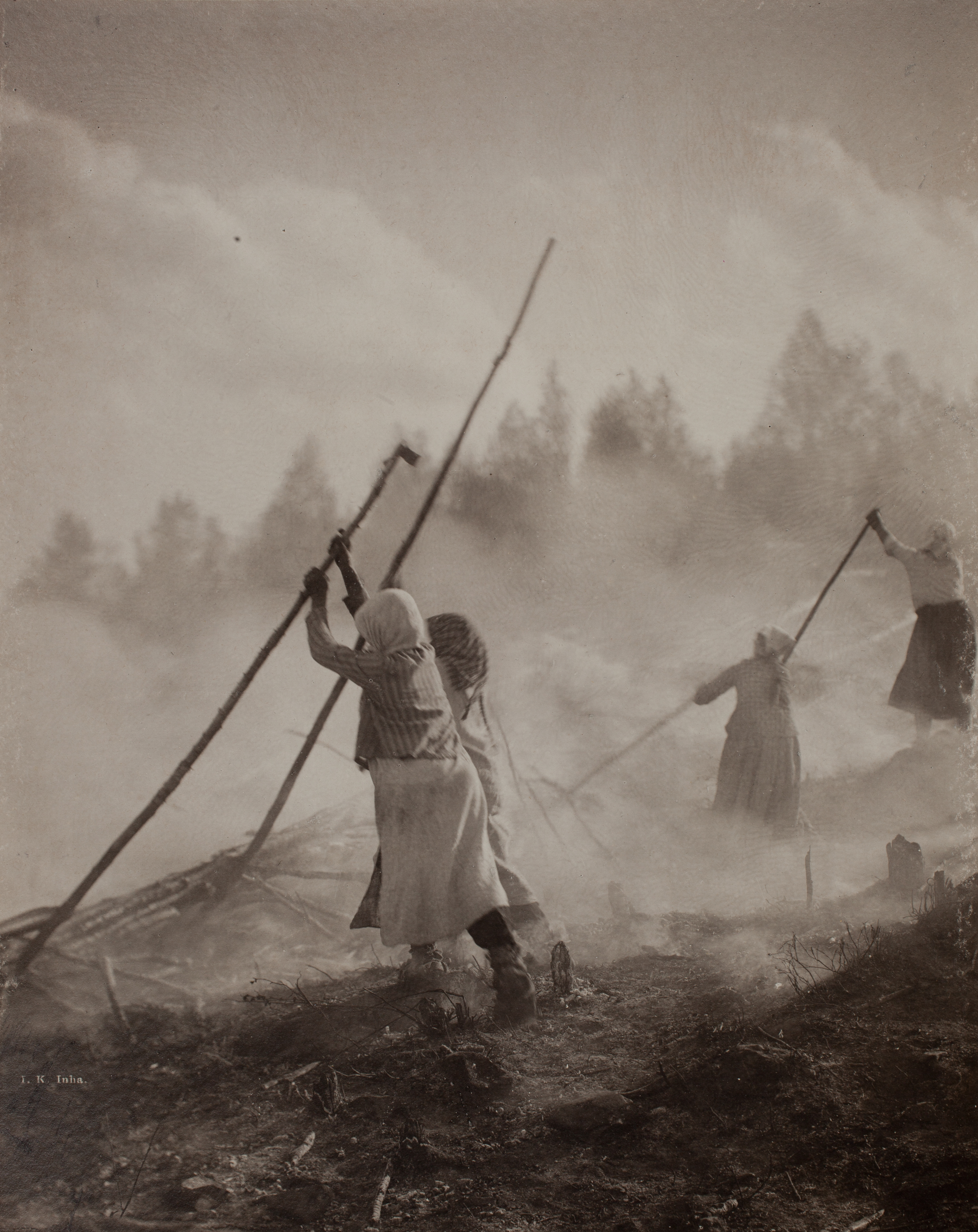
Slashing-and-burning in Eno, Finland, in 1893

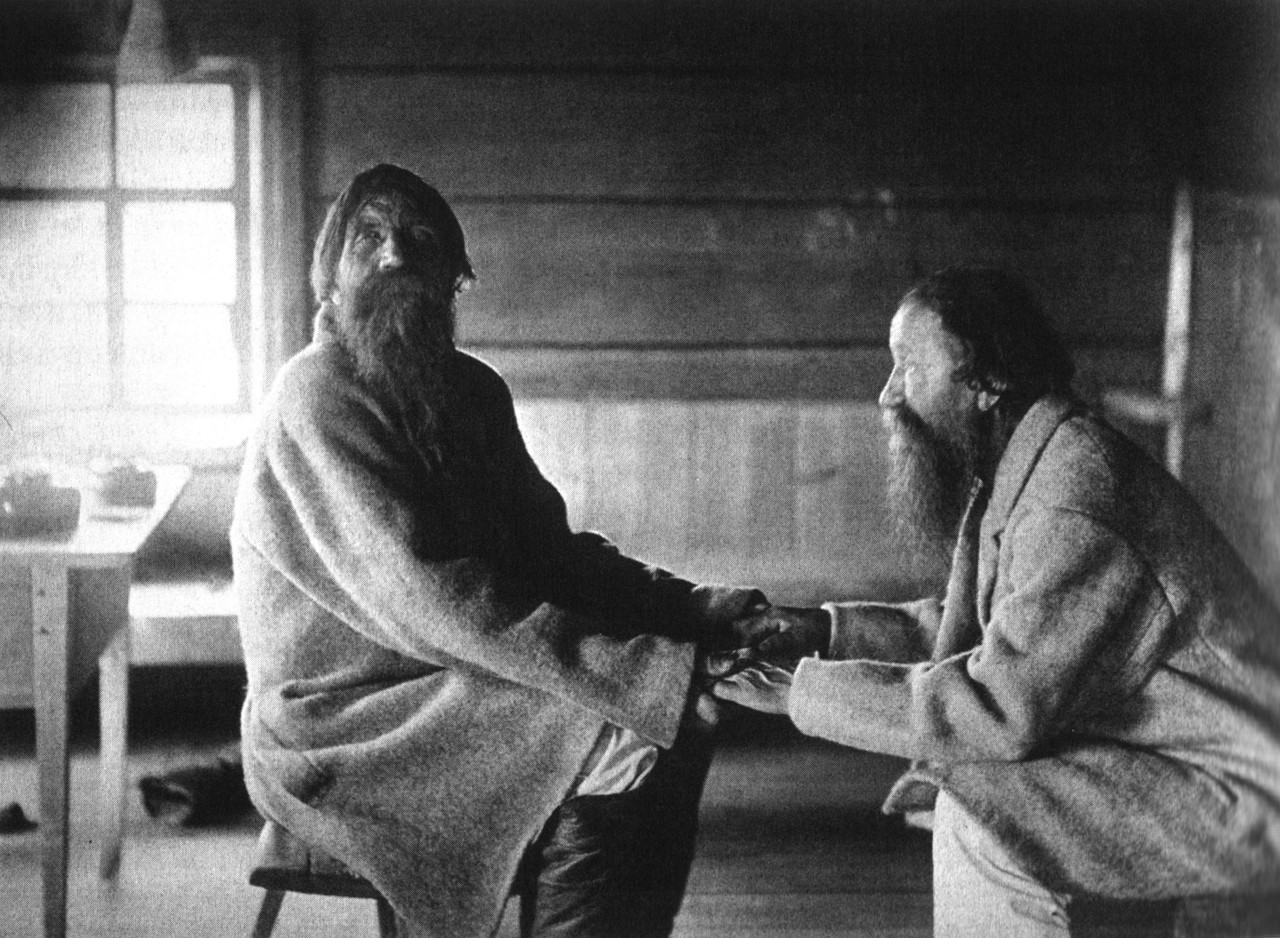
Brothers Poavila and Triihvo Jamanen, 1894

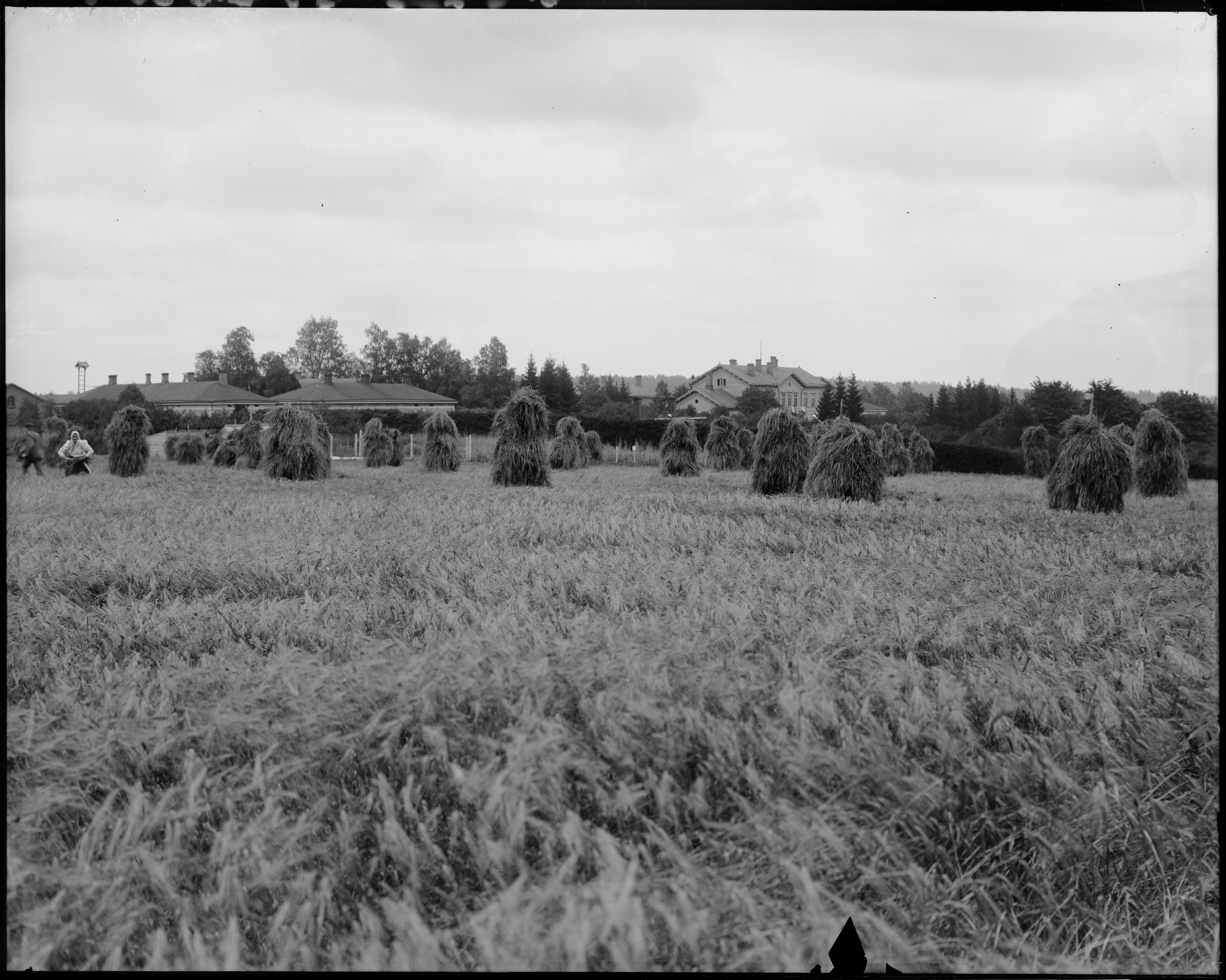
Mustiala School of Agriculture, 1899

Inha was a prominent journalist and worked for the Finnish newspaper Uusi Suometar for almost twenty years (1888–1906) as an editor of foreign affairs. He was also dispatched as an official correspondent to Athens in 1897 to cover the Greco-Turkish War (1897) and to London in 1899 to correspond on the ongoing Second Boer War. These were most likely the first times a Finnish newspaper sent out an official correspondent to cover foreign conflicts abroad. He also wrote critique on music, literature, and other arts and doubled as a photographer for the paper.

Inha translated around forty books into Finnish chiefly from German and French but also English originals, wrote over twenty books of his own, mostly on popular themes in geography and natural sciences, and edited almost as many compilations on similar topics.

== Anecdotal ==
Inha was an avid cyclist and made many of his trips in Finland and in Europe on a bike. He was also among the first to import bicycles to Finland and even the Finnish word for bicycle (polkupyörä) is often claimed to have been coined by Inha.

During his vast domestic travels Inha is claimed to have visited every municipality in Finland.

== Bibliography ==
=== Written works ===
- Balkanin niemimaa 1. (Maantieteellisiä kuvaelmia, 31) Helsinki 1906. (2+) 40 p. (Kansanvalistusseuran toim. 139)
- Balkanin niemimaa 2. (Maantieteellisiä kuvaelmia, 32) Helsinki 1907. (2+) 50 p. (Kansanvalistusseuran toim. 142)
- Hellas ja helleenit. Piirteitä nykyisestä Kreikasta ja sen muinaismuistoista. Helsinki 1897. 198 p. Otava.
- Helsingin opas. Etelä-suomalaisen osakunnan toimittama. Porvoo WSOY 1910. 239 p. Karttaliite. (photographs by I. K. Inha)
- Helsinki – valon kaupunki. I. K. Inhan valokuvia 1900-luvun alun Helsingistä. WSOY 2009 ISBN 978-951-0-35022-5
- I.K. Inha 1894, valokuvaaja Vienan Karjalassa. (Photography collection, eds. U. Vento and P. Laaksonen). Helsinki 1968. Suomalaisen Kirjallisuuden Seura. 2nd edition. (ed. Pekka Laaksonen) Helsinki 1990. 96 p. (Includes a travel account by K.F. Karjalainen)
- Islanti. Tarun ja runon maa. Helsinki 1912. 134 p. (Kansanvalistus-seuran toimituksia 162.)
- Jään ja tulen pohjola. Porvoo 1912. 70 p. WSOY. (written by I.K. Inha according to O. Nordenskjöld, Th. Thoroddsen et al.)
- Kalevalan laulumailta. Elias Lönnrotin poluilla Vienan Karjalassa. Kuvaus Vienan Karjalan maasta, kansasta, siellä tapahtuneesta runonkeruusta ja runoista itsestään. Helsinki 1911. 432 p. Karttalehti. Kansanvalistusseura. 2nd printing. Helsinki 1921. 403 p. Karttalehti. Tietosanakirja-Osakeyhtiö. 3rd printing. (ed. Pekka Laaksonen) Helsinki 1999. 438 p.
- Kansakoulun karttakirja. Pienoinen opas avarassa maailmassa. Helsinki 1908. 48 p. (32nd printing, Helsinki 1960)
- Kiertomatka Kalevalan laulumailla (Vienan Karjalassa). Helsinki [1912]. 8 p. (Kansanvalistusseuran taikalyhtykirjoja, 29.) (according to photographs by I.K.Inha)
- Kreikka I. (Maantieteellisiä kuvaelmia. XXIII.) Helsinki 1899. 40 p. (Kansanvalistus-seuran toim. 106)
- Kreikka II. (Maantieteellisiä kuvaelmia. XXVI.) Helsinki 1900. 55 p. (Kansanvalistus-seuran toim. 117)
- Lähetyssaarnaaja. Kertomus Etelämeren saarelta. Under pseudonym -ns-. Hämeenlinna 1885.
- Maantiede ja löytöretket. Kertomus siitä miten maa on tullut tunnetuksi ja maantiede kehittynyt. I–IV. I: Vanha aika ja keski aika. Porvoo 1912. 441 p. WSOY. II: Suurien löytöretkien aikakausi. Porvoo 1914. 544 p. WSOY. III: Uusin aika (alkupuoli). Porvoo 1923. 506 p. WSOY. IV: Uusin aika (loppupuoli). Porvoo 1926. 708 p. WSOY.
- Pohjolan maisemia vuosisadan vaihteessa. Porvoo 1957. 197 p. WSOY.
- Saksanmaa. (Maantieteellisiä kuvaelmia, 34) Helsinki 1909–10. 276 p. Kansanvalistusseura.
- Sodan aapinen. Kaukaisen idän opas. Helsinki 1904. 16 p. Yrjö Weilin.
- Suomen maisemia. Näkemänsä mukaan kuvaillut. Porvoo 1909. 395 p. WSOY. 2nd printing. Porvoo 1925. 498 p. WSOY. 3rd printing. Helsinki 1988. 352 p.
- Suomi kuvissa. Wien/Kuopio/Helsinki 1895–96. 175 p. and 93 photographic pages. Wentzel Hagelstam, Uno Wasastjerna. (Text in Kuopio and Helsinki. Photographs Wien, "Steyrermühl") (Text in Finnish, Swedish, Russian, French, German, and English)
- Thomas Alva Edison. F.L. Dyerin ja T.C. Martinin julkaiseman elämäkerran johdolla. Porvoo 1926. 234 p. WSOY.
- Vienan Karjala. Porvoo 1932.

=== Edited works ===
- Luonto tieteen valossa I–IV. (together with G. Melander, K. E. Kivirikko and V. Bonsdorff) Porvoo 1908–11. 379+48 p., 382+48 p., 384+48 p., 388+48 p. WSOY. 2nd printing. Porvoo 1922. 381 p. and 8 photographic pages. WSOY.
- Ihmeitten kirja. Kuvauksia luonnon ja ihmisneron suurista ihmeistä. 1–2 vuosikerta. Porvoo 1916–17. 770 p.
- Kyläkirjaston kuvalehti (magazine edited by Inha during 1897–1906)
- Lasten ihmeitten kirja. Porvoo 1911. 148 p. WSOY. (adapted from the English original by I.K. Inha)
- Löytöretkillä I–II. Herman Wagnerin mukaan Suomen nuorisolle toimittanut. Porvoo 1916. WSOY. I: Kotona. 97 p. II: Kotipiirissä. 131 p.
- Maailman ihmeet I–IV. Esitys luonnon ja ihmisen mestaritöistä, sellaisina kuin ne nykyään ovat nähtävinä. I: Aasian ihmeet. Porvoo 1911. 1–220 p. II: Australian ja Afrikan ihmeet. Porvoo 1912. 221–379 p. III: Amerikan ihmeet. Porvoo 1912. 381–520 p. IV: Euroopan ihmeet. Porvoo 1913. 525–664 p. WSOY. (text adapted by I.K. Inha from English original travel journals)
- Suuret keksijät I–II. Helge Holstin julkaiseman tanskalaisen kokoelman mukaan. Porvoo 1920–21. 344 p., 315 p. WSOY.
- Tiede ja elämä I–IV. Porvoo 1919–22. 576 p., 572 p.,576 p., 572 p. WSOY.

== Links and additional source material ==
- Aamu Nyström: I. K. Inha. Valokuvaaja, kirjailija, kulttuurin löytöretkeilijä. Jyväskylä, Minerva Kustannus, 2011, ISBN 978-952-492-441-2
- Matti Klinge (ed.): Suomen kansallisbiografia 4 (Hirviluoto – Karjalainen), 2004, pp. 334–336, Helsinki: Suomalaisen Kirjallisuuden Seura, ISBN 9517464452 (written by Tuomo-Juhani Vuorenmaa)
- I.K. Inha: Suomi kuvissa, Helsinki 1896. Digital collection of the Finnish National Archive.
- I.K. Inha site on the Jäähdyspohja village society web pages
- I.K. Inha's description of rafting on the river Oulujoki in Digi.fi
- Biography of I.K. Inha by K.A. Ennola (in Finnish)
- Writings by K.A. Ennola on I. K. Inha's life and travels (in Finnish)
- Doctoral dissertation by Kati Lintonen: Valokuvallistettu luonto: I. K. Inhan tuotanto luonnon merkityksellistäjänä (in Finnish)
