= Arne Halonen =

Finnish journalist (1898–1986)

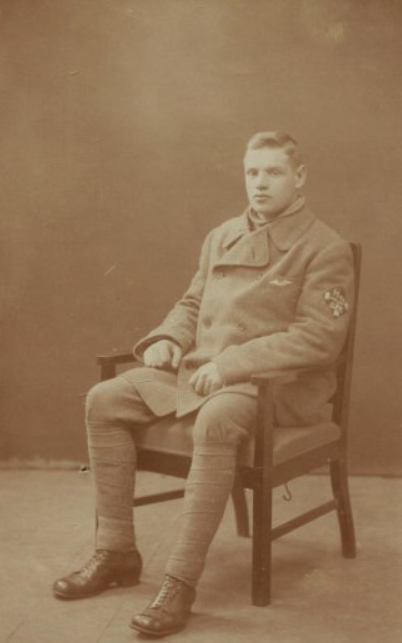
- Arne Halonen during the Finnish Civil War
- Born: 9 November 1898; Helsinki, Grand Duchy of Finland
- Died: 14 April 1986 (aged 87); Forssa, Finland
- Occupations: Journalist, teacher

Arne Halonen (9 November 1898 – 14 April 1986) was a Finnish journalist and university teacher. He was active in the Finnish–American socialist movement and worked in the University of Minnesota. Halonen is also known for his 1928 book Suomen luokkasota (Finnish Class War), which was banned in Finland.

== Life ==
Halonen was a high school student as the 1918 Finnish Civil War broke out. He served as an office clerk for the Red Government and was captured in April after the Battle of Viipuri. Halonen spent few weeks at a prison camp, but was soon released. In fall 1918, he entered the University of Helsinki. In 1920, Halonen emigrated to the United States, following his elder brother George Halonen. He worked for the Finnish–American socialist newspapers Raivaaja, Työmies and Eteenpäin. In 1928, Halonen was expelled from the Communist Party USA and he joined the Socialist Party of America.

In the 1930s, Halonen worked in the insurance and real estate businesses in Minneapolis. He was the founder of the cooperative insurance company Cooperators' Life Association. During the Winter War, Halonen raised funds for Finland organizing the Minnesota branch of the Finnish Relief Fund. Halonen earned his master's degree at the University of Minnesota, where he taught Finnish language and political science from 1950 to 1962. Halonen returned Finland in 1983 and died at the age of 87 in April 1986.

== Works ==
- Halonen, Arne (ed.): Suomen luokkasota: historiaa ja muistelmia [Finnish Class War: History and Memoires], 1928
- Sulkanen, Elis & Halonen, Arne: Kominternin politiikan vararikko [Bankruptcy of Komintern Politics], 1930
- The Role of Finnish–Americans in the Political Labor Movement, 1945, Master's thesis
