= Multiple code theory =

Cognitive and clinical psychology theory

Multiple code theory (MCT) is a theory that conceives of the human brain as processing information in three codes. A certain issue can be coded in three languages, via symbolic verbal information (letters), symbolic nonverbal information (images), and pre-symbolic information (body feeling). This theory was first hypothesized by cognitive scientist and psychoanalytic researcher Wilma Bucci (Derner School of Psychology, Adelphi University), who combines the work of Antonio Damasio and psychoanalysis. What is important for psychotherapy is that there is no direct connection between the world of words and the physical world, but that the images are a pivotal point for communication between the mind and the limbic system and serve as a kind of translator. There is an image attached to every word and a physical feeling attached to every image. Her work had a major influence on the further development of various psychotherapeutic procedures.

A symbolic verbal code includes discrete words and subsequently images embedded in the language and is processed in a single track. A symbolic nonverbal code includes modality-specific mental and embodied images. Sensory and emotional experience is processed in a pre-symbolic code. This kind of pre-symbolic processing relies predominantly on analogic relationships, with the information it processes being continuous rather than discrete. MCT posits these three kinds of processing as loosely connected to one another through a set of cognitive functions called the referential process.

Multiple code theory and the associated theory of the referential process draw on and bridge variously associated fields, including clinical psychology, psychoanalysis, cognitive psychology, psycholinguistics, and linguistics.

== Related concepts ==
=== The Dual-coding theory ===
The Dual-coding theory is a theory of cognition that suggests that the mind processes information along two different channels; verbal and nonverbal. It was hypothesized by Allan Paivio of the University of Western Ontario in 1971.

=== The referential process ===
The Referential Process (RP) refers to a set of cognitive functions that connect symbolic verbal, symbolic nonverbal, and subsymbolic information, allowing an individual to put words to emotional experiences. It is hypothesized that the referential process operates in a three-stage cycle. This cycle begins with a phase of bodily and emotional arousal associated with a particular experience (arousal), the connection of that embodied experience to language (symbolizing), and the subsequent reorganization of the cognitive and emotional schemas previously associated with that experience (reflection/reorganizing). Disruptions to the referential process lead to dissociations of the various verbal and nonverbal aspects of the schema, and a consequent disruption in emotion regulation and construction of meaning. The referential process has been operationalized with various language-based measures, both hand-scored and computerized.

=== Emotion schemas ===
An emotion schema is a kind of memory schema made up of a representation of a self in relation to an other. It is initially built up primarily through repeated affective experiences. Subsymbolic information, which may be connected to symbolic verbal and nonverbal forms of information via the referential process, constitutes the core of an emotion schema. The dissociation of the various informational codes within the emotion schema has been associated with various forms of psychopathology. The model of psychopathology in Multiple Code Theory is thus one based primarily on dissociation, with traumatic psychological experiences triggering dissociative processes whereby the subsymbolic aspects of emotional schemas become disconnected from symbolic codes. A primary goal of psychotherapy is thus the integration of dissociated schemas.
