= George Halonen =

Finnish–American journalist (1891–1954)

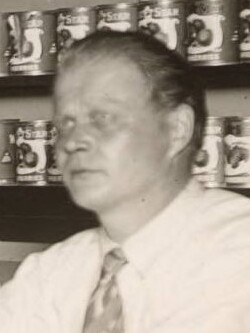
Halonen in 1928

George Halonen (born Yrjö Halonen, 15 December 1891 – 12 May 1954) was a Finnish–American journalist and cooperative organizer.

Halonen was born in Helsinki, Grand Duchy of Finland. In 1912, Halonen emigrated to North America where he worked for the Finnish–Canadian newspaper Työkansa in Port Arthur, Ontario from 1912 to 1913 and for Raivaaja in Fitchburg, Massachusetts from 1914 to 1919. Halonen was active in the Finnish Socialist Federation and became one of the leading Finnish American communists. In the early 1920s, Halonen moved to Superior, Wisconsin. Halonen was the editor of Työmies and since 1924 he worked as a division manager for the Co-operative Central Exchange. Halonen also ran the representative office of the Karelian ASSR.

In 1929 Halonen was expelled from the Communist Party USA as he favored an independent cooperative organization instead of centralizing. In 1942, Halonen moved to California. He took lessons at the University of Stanford and cataloged Finnish material in the Hoover Institution Library and Archives of Palo Alto. Halonen died in Superior, Wisconsin.

George Halonen's brother was the Finnish American journalist Arne Halonen.

== Works ==
- English-Finnish dictionary, 1924
- Why co-operation: consumer's co-operative movement in U.S.A., 1928
