= Suomen luokkasota =

Military history book by Arne Halonen

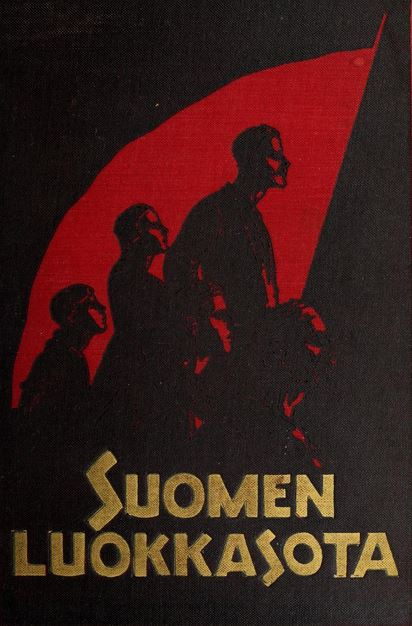
- Author: Arne Halonen (ed.)
- Language: Finnish
- Genre: Military history
- Publisher: Finnish Socialist Federation, Superior, Wisconsin
- Publication date: 1928
- Publication place: United States
- Pages: 528

Suomen luokkasota: historiaa ja muistelmia ("Finnish Class War: History and Memoires") is a 1928 book of the Finnish Civil War edited by Arne Halonen. The book includes memoires of the Red side of the war. Suomen luokkasota is the first book on the 1918 Civil War written from the Red retrospective. It was compiled by Finnish-American socialists on the 10th anniversary of the war.

Chapters are written by ordinary Red Guard fighters and Red leaders like Kullervo Manner, Väinö Jokinen, Yrjö Sirola, Lauri Letonmäki, Kössi Kaatra, Lauri Luoto, Tuure Lehén and Santeri Nuorteva. The book has been described as propagandist with far-left views. However, the historian Thure Svedlin, who fought for the Whites, says the book helps to understand the Red viewpoint.

The book was printed and published in Superior, Wisconsin. It was sold in North America, Sweden and Soviet Union, but banned in Finland. In January 1929, one thousand copies were shipped to Helsinki where the State Police confiscated the books. Another set of books, disguised as poultry farming guides, was caught in the Swedish border. Small number made it to Finland, where the books were seized in communist raids through the 1930s.
