= Aku Päiviö =

Finnish Canadian writer

Aukusti "Aku" Päiviö (2 April 1879 – 13 May 1967) was a Finnish Canadian journalist, poet and socialist. With Sanna Kannasto and A.T. Hill, he was one of the key figures in the Finnish Canadian socialist movement of the early 1900s. Päiviö was a Marxist who saw education as the most important part of the class struggle.

== Biography ==
Päiviö was born in the municipality of Kärsämäki, Finland, in the Northern Ostrobothnia region. He emigrated to the United States in 1902 at the age of 23. Päiviö worked as the editor of Finnish American newspapers Amerikan Uutiset (The American News), Päivän Uutiset (The Daily News) and Kansan Lehti (The People's Newspaper), published in Calumet and Ironwood, Michigan.

In June 1905 Päiviö began as the editor of Raivaaja (The Pioneer), the Eastern newspaper of the Finnish Socialist Federation located in Fitchburg, Massachusetts. He would remain in the position until the spring of 1906, after which he would remain on the staff as an Associate Editor until December 1909.

Päiviö was married in 1906 and moved to Thunder Bay, Ontario in 1912. For seventeen years Päiviö earned his living as a poet and a playwright. In 1929 he was invited by the Finnish Organization of Canada to work as the editor of their Vapaus newspaper in Sudbury. Ten years later Päiviö became the editor of literary and women's magazine Liekki (The Flame) that was established in 1935. Liekki was a magazine with more short stories, poems and entertainment than political thrust. Päiviös literary work include hundreds of poems published in several anthologies, three novels and six plays, of which three were for children. They were mostly written in Finnish. He died in 1967 in Ontario, Canada.

== Family ==
Aku Päiviö and his Finnish-born spouse Ida Hänninen (1882–1968) had six children, four sons and two daughters. Their son Jules Päiviö (1917–2013) was an architect and professor. He was the last surviving member of the Mackenzie–Papineau Battalion fighting in the Spanish Civil War. As Jules volunteered the war, Aku wrote his best-known poem, To My Son in Spain, dedicated to his son. Päiviö's son, Allan Paivio, was an emeritus professor of psychology at the University of Western Ontario. He was best known for his dual-coding theory. His other sons were Veikko Paivio (1910–1987) and Allan (Raikas) Paivio, and daughters Terry (Terttu Paivio) Hart (1908–1995) and Tilhi (Paivio) Simmons (1914–1992).
