= Jules Paivio =

Canadian architect and soldier

Jules Peter Paivio (29 April 1917 – 4 September 2013) was a Canadian architect, professor, and soldier. A veteran of the Spanish Civil War, he was the last surviving member of the Mackenzie–Papineau Battalion.

== Early life and family ==
Paivio was born near Port Arthur, Ontario, and raised in nearby Sudbury by his Finnish parents. His father Aku Päiviö was a Finnish Canadian journalist, poet and socialist. Päiviö's brother Allan Paivio was an emeritus professor of psychology at the University of Western Ontario. He was best known for his dual-coding theory.

== Spanish Civil War ==
Paivio left Canada at the age of 19 to fight in the Spanish Civil War. He was captured during the war, saved from execution by an Italian officer, and placed in a prisoner-of-war camp. Paivio was the last surviving Canadian veteran of the Spanish Civil War, and in 2012 he was honored by the Spanish government by being granted honorary citizenship.

== World War II ==
During World War II, Paivio trained soldiers in map-reading and surveying.

== Academic career ==
Paivio was a trained architect and taught at Ryerson University.

== Death ==
Jules Paivio died on 4 September 2013, at the age of 97.
