= Socialist Party of Oregon =

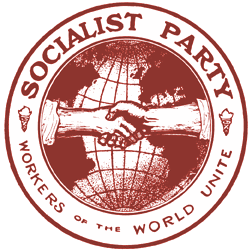
- Founded: 1899 (SDP); 1901 (SPA); 1992 (SPUSA)
- Ideology: Socialism; Socialist feminism
- Political position: Left-wing
- Colors: Red

The Socialist Party of Oregon (SPO) is the name of three closely related organizations — an Oregon state affiliate of the Social Democratic Party of America (later the Socialist Party of America) established in 1897 and continuing into the 1950s, as well as the Oregon state affiliate of the Socialist Party USA from 1992 to 1999.

== Socialist Party of America affiliate (1890s–1950s) ==
=== Origins ===
C.W. Barzee (1859–1940) was one of the initial organizers of the Socialist Party of Oregon and its candidate for governor in 1906.

The Socialist Party of Oregon traces its roots to the late 1890s, when local affiliates of the Socialist Party's antecedent, the Social Democratic Party (SDP) first emerged. The earliest published report that a local branch of the SDP had been formed in the state appeared in the Appeal to Reason in October 1899. By the end of the year a rudimentary state organization was in place, with a state organizer, J.D. Stevens of Portland, actively involved in the effort to establish local branches of the organization.

The SDP underwent a small, incremental growth process during 1900, with a local branch launched in Oregon City in March. A formal state organizational convention followed, held in Portland on April 10, 1900. In the fall election of 1900, the unity slate of Eugene V. Debs and Job Harriman gained 1.76% of the presidential vote in Oregon running a joint campaign on behalf of the two independent SDP factions in the November 1900 election.

Following the establishment of the Socialist Party of America in August 1901, a move was made to organize the state under the name of the new party. The inaugural gathering was held September 25, 1901 at Women's Christian Temperance Union Hall in Salem. Attendance was light and the start of the session was postponed one hour to allow time for delegates to debark from a train from Portland. The dozen or so delegates elected a chairman and secretary and conducted routine organizational business, naming Albany as the first headquarters city for the fledgling organization. Oregon was granted an official state charter by National Secretary Leon Greenbaum during the second half of October 1901. A few counties seem to have organized at this time, such as the 50 individuals who gathered in Oregon City to form a county organization for Clackamas County.

The modest launch of the party was followed with a flurry of enthusiastic county-level conventions during the spring of the election year of 1902. The Marion County gathering alone drew over 100 participants to a gathering held March 5, 1902 in Salem to nominate candidates and approve a platform. The fledgling SPO was able to field broad slates of candidates around the state for the June 1902 general election, with the statewide ticket headed by R.R. Ryan of Marion County for Governor, C. W. Barzee of The Dalles for Secretary of State, B. F. Ramp of Douglas County for Congress in the 1st District, and D.T. Gerdes of Clatsop County, Oregon for Congress in the 2nd District.

Party headquarters were moved to Portland by decision of the March 1904 State Convention, where they would remain throughout the Debsian period,

The Socialist Party's 1904 ticket generated an even stronger showing, with Debs and his running mate, Benjamin Hanford of New York, receiving approximately 8.5% of the vote.

=== Comparison to the Socialist Party of Washington ===
Although (or perhaps because) it was an older state than its less populated neighbor to the north, Washington, Oregon never generated as large or influential a political organization as was the Socialist Party of Washington. Nor did Oregon generate any publications with a national readership, as was the case with the Seattle Socialist, the Industrial Workers of the World weekly The Industrial Worker, published in Spokane, or even the weekly papers of two of the utopian socialist colonies established in Western Washington just prior to the turn of the 20th century.

Portland, the largest urban center in Oregon, was a far more orderly town than was Seattle, the rowdy upstart to the north. As historian Carlos A. Schwantes notes, Portland was "conservative, business oriented, with a tendency towards smugness among its elite" and consequently the Oregon labor movement was correspondingly more cautious than were the shipping and mill workers of Puget Sound.

=== The "Red Special" of 1908 ===
The election of 1908 saw the arrival in Oregon of Presidential candidate Eugene Debs aboard the so-called "Red Special," a train chartered by the Socialist Party and taken from station to station around the country for campaign speeches on the fly. The train made several stops in Oregon on September 14, energizing the state's party members.

Speaking in Eugene, Debs declared "I am the candidate of the workingmen, and don't expect the votes of any capitalists." An enthusiastic crowd was addressed in Albany, with Debs asserting that the two old parties each represented the capitalists rather than the people and that the Republican Party had fulfilled its historic mission by freeing the slaves, subsequently becoming a political organization of the plutocracy.

An evening speech on September 14 by Debs at the Exposition Auditorium on Washington Street attracted more than 10,000 spectators, erupted upon the appearance of the candidate in the hall:

"Men and women stood on chairs and benches and waved handkerchiefs, hats, and umbrellas. Ten thousand voices howled and shouted until the band, which had started to play, was drowned out and could not be heard. This commotion lasting for a couple of minutes subsided in three cheers and a tiger led by Chairman [Tom J.] Lewis."

Radical SPO State Secretary Tom Sladden made particular note of the 3,000 person procession in Portland which preceded Debs' appearance and expressed optimism about the party's prospects for an increased vote in November:

"The sentimentalists are quitting us; the revolutionary element that four years ago were scoffing at us are joining us now. The lines are being drawn sharply, hatred is being expressed and a class conflict is clearly in evidence. We have enthusiastic members and bitter enemies and the man on the fence is getting hell from both sides."

Sladden noted that from 1904 to 1908, the number of Socialist Party Locals in Oregon had grown from 32 to 74, despite a lack of full-time party organizers.

=== The heyday of Oregon Socialism ===
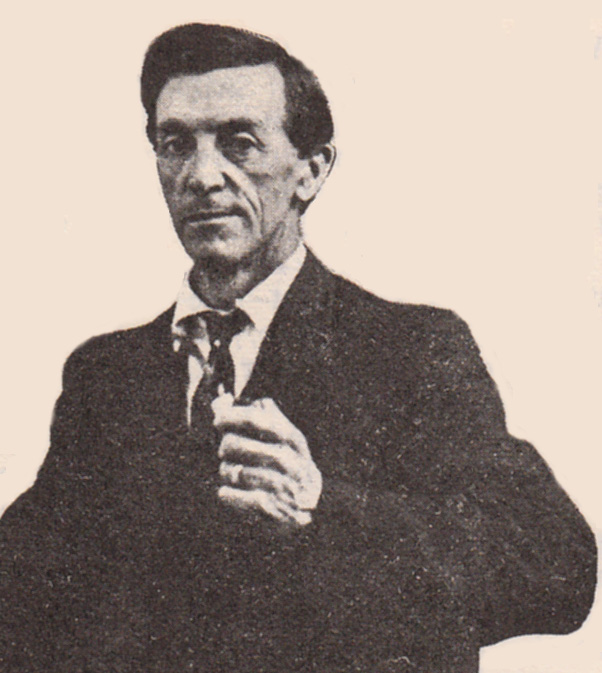
Tom J. Lewis, a renowned orator and important figure in the socialist movement of the Pacific coast.

The years 1910 through 1912 marked a high-water mark of sorts for the Socialist Party of Oregon in terms of its size and influence. The organization conducted an impressive demonstration in the afternoon of May Day 1910, in which 1500 members and supporters of the party, decked out in red ribbons and carrying red banners, marched through the streets of Portland. Beginning at 309 Davis Street, the procession of men, women, and children marched with neither police protection nor police interference to a vacant lot recently purchased for a future school. There a crowd estimated by a supporter at 4,000 people heard speeches and sang together "The Red Flag" and "The Marsellaise," before adjourning to Finnish Socialist Hall for singing and dancing until midnight.

In June 1910 Klamath Falls in Southern Oregon became the site of the first "Socialist Encampment" in the Western United States with the establishment of "Camp Progress." In an idea borrowed from the evangelical protestant religious movement and used with particular effectiveness in Oklahoma, a socialist "revival meeting" was held. More than 60 tents were divided into two parallel lines, with very large tents suitable for group meetings raised at either end. Socialists and their friends camped together, attending politically oriented meetings in the evenings in which they sang, watched plays, listened to speakers and debates, and were entertained by a 12-member "Encampment Band." Members of the local community were invited to attend the evening meetings, which drew between 2,000 and 3,000 attendees during each of the 8 days of the encampment. Speakers included J. Stitt Wilson, journalists Cloudesley and Dorothy Johns, and Tom J. Lewis.

One Oregon Socialist in attendance saw the 1910 Encampment as a large step forward for the party organization:

"As I looked nightly over the immense throng in the Big Tent, noted the striking absence of dissent to the utterances of our speakers, even the most revolutionary, heard the at times uproarious applause, I recall the time four years ago when the handful of members of Local Klamath Falls held their meetings in a lumber yard. Later the meetings were held at private houses and afterward a hall was hired. The local has had a hard fight and has had its seasons of depressions, also its internal dissensions, but today the movement is progressing at a rapid rate. * * *

"What impressed even the most casual observer at the Encampment was the Spirit of Comradeship that was so plainly manifested, the atmosphere of equality and freedom from conventionality that prevailed."

The Socialist Party showed promise at the polls in the November 1910 general election, with Albany furniture factory worker W.S. Richards receiving more than 7.5% of the total vote in his campaign for Governor of Oregon.

A short-lived effort to organize unemployed workers took place in 1912 with the formation of a mass organization called the "League of the Unemployed." An initial membership of 1,000 was dubiously reported in the press, an error resulting from sloppy misreporting of a January 21 open air meeting in Portland at which "nearly 1,000 men raised their hand in response to the query as to how many were unemployed." An organizing committee of 8, headed by Tom Lewis, was named and a march planned for January 28. This effort appears to have fizzled and the new auxiliary organization vanished without a trace.

By the summer of 1915, the SPO had English-language Locals and official party contact names in 69 Oregon towns, with an additional Finnish Locals in Astoria and Svenson, as well as Finnish, Latvian, German, and Polish branches of Local Portland.

=== The Finnish Socialists of Astoria ===
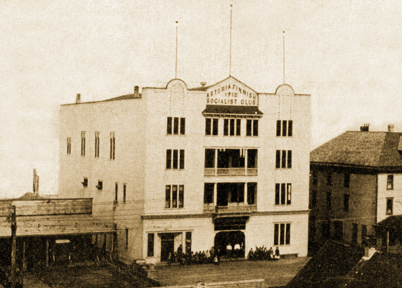
Astoria Finnish Socialist Hall, constructed by the Astoria Finnish Socialist Club in 1910. The building was later destroyed in a fire.

The early Socialist Party of Oregon was in many ways a federation of two parallel organizations — an English-language organization centered in Portland, the state's largest city, and Finnish-language organization consisting of a cluster of radical émigrés from Finland who made their home in the old coastal town of Astoria.

The migration of Finns to North America began in the early 1860s, when representatives of Michigan mining interests began to actively recruit hardy Finnish workers as a labor source. This purely economic migration was joined by others who chose to escape the political hegemony of the Russian Empire, of which Finland was only a semi-autonomous part. By the coming of World War I, over 300,000 Finns had left their native land for jobs or freedom.

Comparatively few of the immigrant Finns were activists in the socialist movement of their native land, but it does not follow that the socialist cause was obscure to those who were not. In the Finnish election of 1907, the first held under conditions of universal suffrage, the Social Democratic Party of Finland garnered an impressive 37% of the popular vote, electing 80 of its members to the 200 seat national parliament and making it the largest political party in the country. Many of the top leaders of the Finnish Socialist movement were ultimately driven into political exile in subsequent years by the Russian Tsarist regime. Finnish socialist politics made itself felt upon the Finnish immigrant population in both ways: socialist ideas were not alien to the community's culture and custom, they were a leading political option back home; and these ideas were advocated by some of the most energetic and outspoken political partisans of the Finnish socialist movement via their newspapers, pamphlets, and public speakers.

Astoria, Oregon, a fishing community of about 10,000 people on the American frontier, happened to be a magnet for the Finnish immigration. Located at the mouth of the Columbia River on the far northwest tip of the state, Astoria was cut off from population centers by the mountains of the Coast Range to the East and the waters of the river to the North, and sat perched upon the hills looking toward the Pacific Ocean in the West. It was a hamlet which developed in isolation, a community where newly arriving Finns could readily find others who spoke their language.

While some worked in the area's not insubstantial timber industry, most of the Finns in Astoria caught steelhead and salmon on the Columbia, working independently as small proprietors on their own boats. The needs of the Finnish fishermen were for cooperation, coordination, and collective social activity and they were generally not pitted against ruthless capitalist enterprise as were their countrymen engaged in mining and timber work in the Upper Midwest. Consequently, the political views of Astoria's Finnish Socialists tended to be moderate and electoral rather than built around the notions of class struggle and revolution. Some of the more radical Finns sometimes disparaged the Astorians for their "fish-captain's" world-view.

The Astoria Finnish Socialist Club (ASSK) was established in 1904 as a branch of the Finnish Socialist Federation (SSJ), an organization which would formally affiliate with the Socialist Party of America on January 1, 1907. The organization gave Finnish adherents of socialism a venue through which they could meet with like minded others and, at least as importantly, meet with other Finnish speakers — throughout their history the language federations of the American socialist movement had both political and social aspects. Membership in the ASSK was open to all Finns at least 18 years of age who accepted basic socialist doctrine and paid minimal dues.

The ASSK was a very small group in its initial inception, consisting of 27 members at the time of its 1904 formation and growing to 59 by 1909. Thereafter the organization grew rapidly, hitting a membership of 250 in 1911, nearly 18% of the members of the Socialist Party of Oregon. Thereafter a split of the pro-syndicalist left wing of the Finnish Socialist Federation dampened the membership level slightly, with 210 members remaining in the club in 1916. Contrary to national trends within the national Socialist Party, the Astoria Finnish Socialist Club then went on another membership surge, probably driven by enthusiasm for revolutionary events in Russia and Finland, with its ranks peaking in excess of 400 members in the summer of 1918.

==== Finnish Socialist press ====
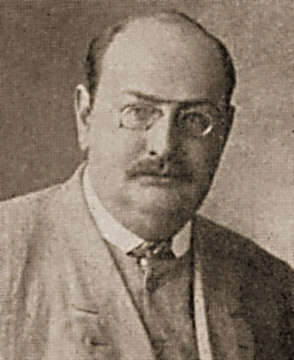
Santeri Nuorteva (1881–1929), a former member of the Finnish parliament, was editor of Toveri when that paper moved to daily status in 1912.

There was no lack of a Finnish-language press for Finnish-American socialists in the early 20th century. From the summer of 1903 there was issued a four-page weekly called Amerikan Suomalainen Työmies ("American Finnish Worker"), a publication which moved to Hancock, Michigan the following year and shortened its name to Työmies. The enclave of Finns located in New England had a paper of their own, Raivaaja ("The Pioneer"), launched early in 1905. With the decision of the national SSJ to divide the Finnish Federation into three districts discussions began to accelerate among the Astorians about the possibility of launching a newspaper of their own to serve as the voice of the Federation's Western District.

In June 1907 a referendum of the Finnish Socialist locals of the West decided to establish a paper for the district and a temporary board of directors was established in Astoria. The venture was capitalized in July through the offer of $5,000 worth of stock at $10 a share. When half of this amount was sold by October, the new holding company, the Western Workmen's Co-operative Publishing Company, was cleared to begin operations.

The first issue of the new paper, named Toveri ("The Comrade") appeared on December 7, 1907, under the editorship of Aku Rissanen, formerly on the editorial staff of Raivaaja. Although planned as a bi-weekly, the paper was impacted by an emerging economic crisis and appeared only irregularly during its first year. The paper moved to daily status in 1912.

It was the presence of this newspaper which drew Santeri Nuorteva to Astoria in 1911, where he replaced editor Rissanen, who was coming to the end of a second stint as editor of the newspaper, begun the previous year. Nuorteva, a giant of the Finnish-American socialist movement, spent two years in Astoria as the paper's editor-in-chief. He would later become the head of the de facto consulate in America of the Finnish Revolutionary government of 1918 and the number two man in the Russian Soviet Government Bureau, de facto consulate of Soviet Russia in 1919.

In 1911 the Western District convention of the SSJ reversed its previous policy and urged its locals to form special women's committees and, where possible, separate women's branches for their female members, with a view to increasing the size and influence of the socialist movement among women, who were beginning to gain the right to vote throughout the West. In Astoria this took the form of the establishment of a sewing club, designed for both social and fundraising purposes, and the foundation of a special weekly newspaper for socialist women, Toveritar ("The Woman Comrade"). Toveritar was launched as a weekly in July 1911 and it continued as such until 1930, when the publication was terminated. In addition to news of the socialist movement, Toveritar included household hints, a section dedicated to the youth movement, poetry, and serialized literature (both original work and material in translation).

In short, although the Socialist movement of Oregon did not produce an English-language newspaper of national note, Toveri had a regional impact as the voice of the Western District of the SSJ and Toveritar had a nationwide impact as the sole Finnish-language newspaper for socialist women. The lengthy existence of their two papers and the ongoing role they played in workers' education were believed by the Finnish Socialists of Astoria to be among their greatest achievements.

In addition to its very large Astoria branch, the Finnish Socialist Federation had three other branches in Oregon as of 1923: a rural branch in Svensen in the logging country near Astoria, a branch in the small mill town of Marshfield (now Coos Bay) on the Southern Oregon coast, and an urban branch in Portland.

==== Electoral activity ====
As electorally oriented socialists, the Finnish Socialists of Astoria desired to participate in the political process and to win control of the apparatus of local government so as to advance the socialist agenda. It took time for the Finns to build an adequate organization and sufficient confidence to enter the political fray, however. In the election of 1904, the English-speaking Socialists of Clatsop County nominated a full slate for the June county elections, although no Finns received places on the ticket.

Indeed, the Finnish Socialists would run no candidates until the election of 1910, when they supplied two of the Socialist Party's candidates for State Representative, as well as the nominees for County Commissioner and County Treasurer. Local Astoria's English-speaking branch supplied the nominees for State Senator, Sheriff, County Clerk, County Assessor, and County Judge. Later that same year, the Finnish and English branches again cooperated in fielding a full ticket in Astoria's city election. None were successful in their bids.

The elections of 1912 and 1914 followed a similar pattern, with full Socialist tickets put forward topped by native English-speakers while the English and Finnish branches each contributed downticket candidates.

By 1916, the English branch seems to have dissolved, leaving the full Socialist ticket to be filled by Finns. Despite this circumstance, Local Astoria still nominated a native American as its candidate for Mayor of Astoria, while Finns occupied 5 of the remaining 6 slots on the ticket, winning one race.

In the election two years hence, the high-water mark for membership in the Astoria Finnish Socialist Club, no ticket was nominated, owing perhaps to war hysteria discouraging the participation of native English-speakers while Finnish-speakers were preoccupied with revolutionary events in the old country and Soviet Russia. Throughout the 1904–1916 period, Socialist candidates generally drew just over 10% of the ballots cast in Astoria, peaking in 1912 with a 15.2% share of votes received.

=== Criminal Syndicalism law ===
On January 14, 1919, a criminal syndicalism statute authored by conservative legislator Kaspar K. Kubli was introduced as House Bill 1 at the opening of the 1919 session of the legislature. Kubli's bill moved speedily through the legislative process and was signed into law on February 3, 1919, with an emergency provision attached putting the law into immediate effect. Initially intended as a legal cudgel to be used against the syndicalist Industrial Workers of the World, the new law made it a felony to advocate in word or writing any doctrine involving "crime, sabotage, violence or any other unlawful methods of terrorism as a means of accomplishing industrial or political reform."

Anyone editing, printing, or circulating a newspaper or pamphlet advocating such doctrines or assisting in formation of an organization or society in support of such activities was to be subject to the law, which called for penalties of up to 10 years in prison and potential fines of up to $5,000. Authorities made immediate use of the new law, arresting Harlin Talbert, State Secretary of the Socialist Party of Oregon, and five others for selling copies of The Western Socialist on the streets of Portland and for "distributing handbills without a license" less than one week after the criminal syndicalism law took effect.

==== The end of Finnish participation in the SPO ====
In the summer of 1919 the Socialist Party of America (SPA), amidst much acrimony, split into three parts, with the Regular faction controlling the National Executive Committee and the National Office suspending six large language federations for their endorsement of the Left Wing Manifesto around with the Left Wing Section was organizing its forces. While the Finnish Socialist Federation was not one of those endorsing the Left Wing Manifesto, and thus not the subject of sanctions, many in the organization were sympathetic to the revolutionary socialist pronouncements of the Manifesto and disgusted by the actions of the NEC.

At its national convention held in Waukegan, Illinois from December 25, 1920, to January 2, 1921, the Finnish Socialist Federation decided to withdraw from the SPA and to instead continue as an independent organization. While it had previously pursued as neutral a line as possible regarding factional scuffles, Toveri under editor Elis Sulkanen came down firmly in favor of an independent existence for the SSJ.

Upon learning of the decision of the Waukegan Convention to separate the Finnish Socialist Federation from the party, Socialist Party Executive Secretary Otto Branstetter immediately set about reorganizing a new Finnish Federation for the Socialist Party. A large percentage of the moderate Eastern District of the now independent SSJ came over the new reorganized Socialist Party-affiliated SSJ, including about 30 branches representing approximately 2,000 members. This group brought with them the daily newspaper of the Eastern District, Raivaaja [The Pioneer].

In this split he Astoria Finns — typical of the entire Western District of the Finnish Federation — stayed loyal to the independent organization. They henceforth remained outside the Socialist Party, as did their newspapers, Toveri and Toveritar. No branches of the SPA's reorganized Finnish Federation were established in Oregon.

=== The Socialist Party of Oregon in the 1930s ===
The party continued to field candidates for public office throughout the first three decades of the 20th century.

In 1934, the SPO, under the leadership of Albert Streiff and George Buickerood, lead the state organization out of the Socialist Party of America under the pretext that the SPA was "too radical." This departure proved to be short-lived, however, as Streiff and Buickerood transferred their allegiance to right wing populist William Lemke in the 1936 Presidential election and the SPO returned to the national Socialist Party of America following the election of Don Sweetland of Portland as State Secretary at the 1936 State Convention and Monroe Sweetland as State Chairman.

The party lost the ability to place candidates on the ballot as "Socialist Party" candidates in the 1940s. Norman Thomas ran for president variously as an 'independent' or as an 'Independent Socialist Principles' in the 1940s. The party did not field Socialist candidates until nearly a half century later, and effectively ceased to exist as an association of electors mid 20th century.

== State Conventions ==
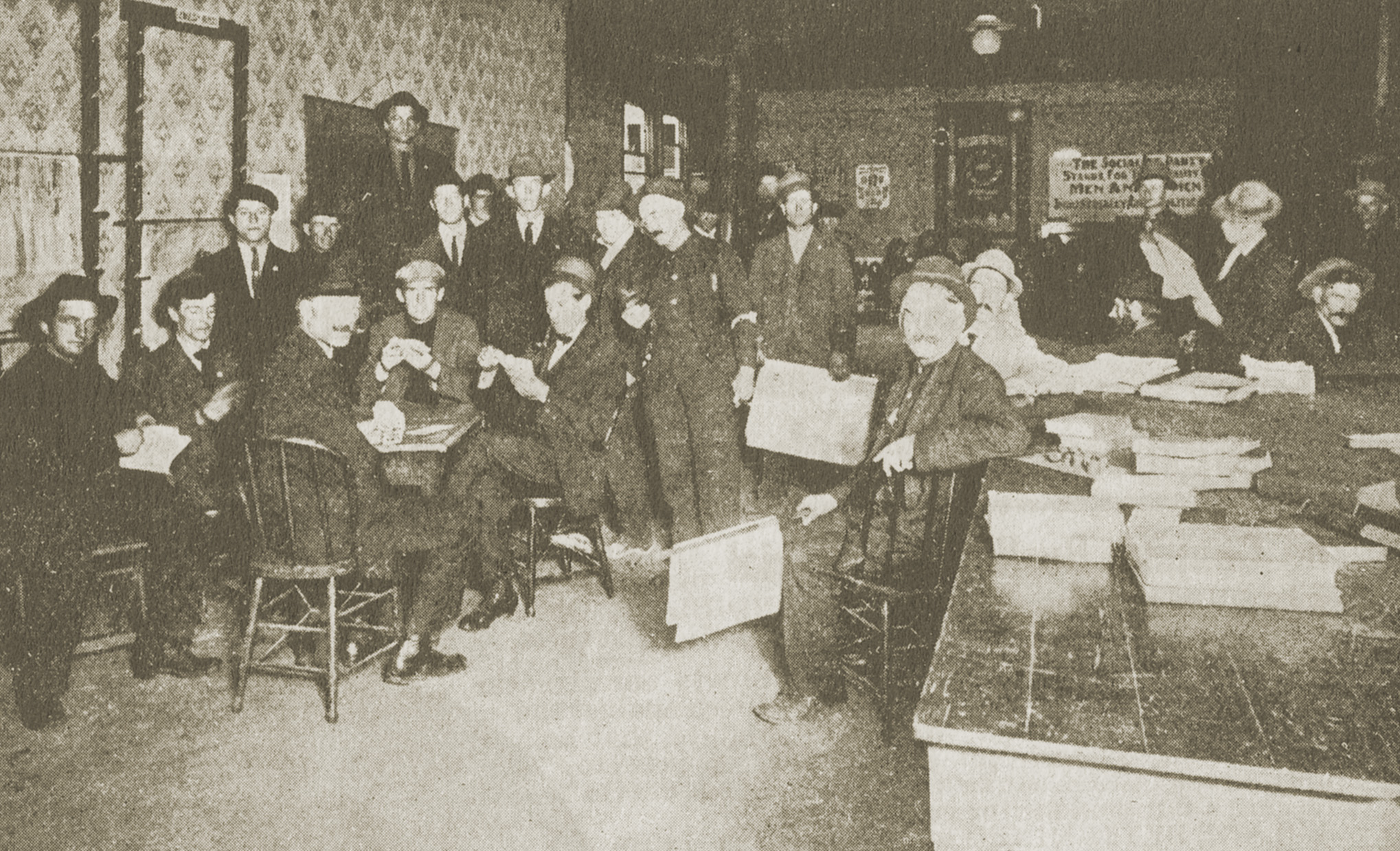
Headquarters of Local Portland, Socialist Party in December 1910.

The Social Democratic Party of Oregon, loyal to the Chicago headquarters, held its first state convention on Thursday, July 12, 1900, at the Washington Hotel, located at Third and Flanders Streets in Portland, for the purpose of selecting Presidential electors for the November ballot. Each branch in the state was entitled to one delegate, either by directly sending a delegate or by assigning a proxy. The gathering also was responsible for electing a State Executive Committee.

In the run-up for the July 1901 convention which established the Socialist Party of America a "socialist mass meeting" was held in Albany on May 31, 1901. This gathering approved a resolution calling for a formal convention to be opened in Oregon not later than October 1 of that same year. In accordance with this decision, a convention call was issued for a gathering at WCTU Hall in Salem for Wednesday, September 21, 1901, in order to form a permanent state organization and adopt a formal platform. The Founding Convention, attended by about a dozen socialists, was actually held on Sunday, September 25 at that location.

The 1902 State Convention was held Wednesday, March 19, 1902, in Portland at Foresters' Hall, 6th and Washington Streets, to nominate a state ticket for the June general election. Between 175 and 200 Socialists were in attendance, nominating R.R. Ryan of Marion County for Governor, among other candidates. The state platform adopted included a plank calling for the exclusion of Chinese and Japanese immigrants from the United States. A second convention was to be held the following day in Oregon City for nomination of a congressional candidate in the 2nd Congressional District. Additional county conventions were to be held on March 5 for the naming of county Socialist Party slates.

A special 1903 Nominating Convention was held April 3, 1903, at Hurst's Hall in Salem to name a candidate for a special election to be held in June to fill the vacancy of the 1st Congressional District seat caused by the death of Republican Representative Thomas H. Tongue. About 50 people attended, with 41 accredited votes being cast. The convention unanimously named John W. Ingle, a 53-year-old Corvallis farmer who had previously served as superintendent of schools in Umatilla County as its nominee. A new electoral platform was approved by the assembled delegates which outlined the basic idea of the class struggle and declared "there is only one weapon with which the working class can successfully oppose the capitalistic system — and that is the ballot."

The 1904 State Convention was held March 3 in Portland at 309 Davis Street, headquarters of Local Portland. The gathering adopted a new constitution for the SPO, subject to referendum of the locals. The gathering endorsed The Real Issue as the official organ of the state party and encouraged party members throughout the state to assist with its subscription list. Portland was chosen as the new state headquarters for the organization and Local Portland made the new State Quorum of the party. SPA National Organizer John W. Brown was in attendance and spoke to large crowds at public meetings in Portland on the evenings of March 2 and 3. The convention named State Organizer C.C. Mikkelsen its candidate for Judge of the Oregon Supreme Court, B.F. Ramp its candidate for U.S. Congress in the 1st Congressional District and George R. Cook in the 2nd, and N. Rasmussen its candidate for State Food and Dairy Commissioner. The party pledged itself to "conduct all the affairs of the state in such a manner as to promote the interests of the working class."

The 1906 State Convention was held in March 1906 and selected a ticket topped by farmer C.W. Barzee of The Dalles as the nominee for governor. County conclaves were held around the state throughout the month of March, naming full tickets for local office across much of Western and Southern Oregon.

The 1910 State Convention was held August 7, 1910, at Finnish Hall, 717 Montana Avenue in Portland. Party nominees for the November 1910 general election included W.S. Richards of Albany for Governor, Allen McDonald of Portland for Secretary of State, and W.A. Crawford of The Dalles for US Congress in the 2nd District. A platform was also approved which called for enfranchisement of all citizens over 21 years of age "regardless of sex, color, or property qualifications" and which called for "the transformation, as rapidly as possible, of the capitalist ownership of the property in the means of production...into the collective property of the producers."

1940 Picnic – As World War II approached, the dwindling Socialist Party of Oregon remained committed to the party's historic anti-war line, hosting a picnic of Oregon progressives on August 18, 1940, at Mickey's Grove, located 5 miles outside of West Salem, Oregon. The gathering, hosted by the Salem Socialist local, was touted as a means of bringing together "farmers, union members, anti-war people, members of co-ops, pacifists, socialists, and progressives throughout the state" to "get acquainted and work out some united plan" against conscription and the restriction of civil liberties.

== State Secretaries ==
- W. S. Richards, Albany. (1901–1904)
- A.H. Axelson, Portland. (1904–1905)
- Claude Robinson, Portland. (1905)
- Thomas A. Sladden, Portland. (1905–1908)
- C. W. Barzee, The Dalles (1909-1910+)

== SPO average paid memberships ==
Year	Average Paid Membership	Exempt Members	National SPA Membership
1901		n/a	4,759 paid (of 7,629)
1902	172	n/a	9,949
1903		n/a	15,975
1904	482	n/a	20,763
1905	435	n/a	23,327
1906	516	n/a	26,784
1907	698	n/a	29,270
1908	924	n/a	41,751
1909	855	n/a	41,470
1910	1,212	n/a	58,011
1911	1,429	n/a	84,716
1912	2,205	n/a	118,045
1913	1,600		95,957
1914	1,281		93,579
1915	967		79,374
1916	1,215		83,284
1917	827		80,379
1918	1,363 (first 6 mos.)		82,344
1919			104,822
1920			26,766
1921			13,484
1922			11,019
1923			10,662
1924			10,125
1925			8,558
1926			8,392
1927			7,425
1928			7,793
1929			9,560
1930			9,736
1931			10,389
1932			16,863
1933			18,548
1934			20,951
1935			19,121
1936			11,922

Sources: Carl D. Thompson, "The Rising Tide of Socialism," The Socialist (Columbus, OH), August 12, 1911, pg. 2; St. Louis Labor, February 22, 1902, pg. 5; "Dues Paid Last Year," The Worker, March 22, 1903, pg. 4; Socialist Party Official Bulletin and successors, Executive Secretary state-by-state membership summaries, January issues;"Socialist Party Official Membership Series,' (1932). Report to 1937 Convention, cited in "Socialist Party of America Annual Membership Figures," Early American Marxism website. "Exempt" members denote those receiving special dispensation from the state office due to unemployment starting 1913. Adoloph Germer, Report of Executive Secretary to the National Executive Committee: Chicago, Illinois — Aug. 8, 1918, pp. 5–6.

== 1992 reorganization ==
Socialist Party of Oregon
- Chairperson: Michael C. Marino
- Founded: 1992
- Headquarters: Portland, Oregon
- Ideology: Democratic socialism
- National affiliation: Independent (formerly: SPUSA)
- Colors: Red and black

The party was re-organized in 1992 by at-large members of the Socialist Party USA, including the organization's 2004 Presidential candidate Walt Brown, Bill Smaldone, James Hadley, Trey Smith, and others with interest in democratic socialism. The Socialist Party of Oregon is recognized as both an activist organization and an electoral vehicle. The Socialist Party of Oregon was a supporter early on of the Health Care for All-Oregon ballot measure, a participant in the successful unionizing effort at Powell's, a continuing presence in the peace movement, and Oregon's electoral arm for democratic socialist electoral politics.

The party regained electoral ballot status through acquisition of ballot lines previously held by others; the No Sales Tax Party was acquired circa 1994 (changing its name to the Socialist Party thereafter) and the Representative Party was acquired in the same year (also changing its name). In 1995, the ballot line of the New Alliance Party was acquired, giving the Socialist Party of Oregon statewide minor party status. The Socialist Party has run candidates for partisan office regularly since that time although in 1998, the party failed to achieve 1% of the statewide vote under then existing state election law, and lost statewide ballot access.

As of November 2008, the party was recognized by the Oregon State Elections Division as a "less than statewide" nominating party, having failed to retain certification outside of Oregon's Third Congressional District. Party organizers subsequently announced a plan to expand ballot access in other areas of the state by circulating petitions to qualify for nominating privileges in individual state house districts.

Segments of the Party's ballot access line remained active until 2008. That same year, the organization disaffiliated from the national Socialist Party USA and continues now as a small independent political organization.

The Party has achieved a few recent electoral successes (although has not won a partisan elective office since re-organization):

- Bill Smaldone, elected to Salem City Council, 1998
- Michael C. Marino, Northwest District Association, 1999–2008

== Prominent Oregon Socialists ==
- Henry Askeli
- C. W. Barzee
- Walt Brown
- Tom Burns
- Louise Bryant
- William Z. Foster
- T. E. Latimer
- Tom J. Lewis
- Santeri Nuorteva
- Wally Priestly
- Benjamin F. Ramp
- Floyd C. Ramp
- John Reed
- William N. Reivo
- W. S. Richards
- Thomas A. Sladden
- Bill Smaldone
- Albert Streiff
- Monroe Sweetland
- Elis Sulkanen
- Trey Smith
- Harlin Talbert
- John Viita
- Harry M. Wicks

== Oregon Socialist press ==
Advertisement for The People's Press, July 1901.

Albany

- The People's Press (1894–1901) —Socialist from 1899; Official organ of SPO in 1901.
- Discontent (1913?)

Astoria

- Toveri [The Comrade] (1907–1931) —Organ of the Finnish Socialist Federation. Master negative film at University of Oregon: 1916–1922.
- Toveritar [The Woman Comrade] (1911–1930) —Organ of the Finnish Socialist Federation. Master negative film at University of Oregon: 1915–1930.

Grants Pass

- The Real Issue (1904–1905) —Official organ of SPO. Incomplete hardcopy run at University of Oregon.

Medford

- Saturday Review (1913)

Milwaukie

- The Alliance (1912–1915)

Portland

- Pacific Coast Citizen (1901–?)
- Vapauttaja (The Liberator) (1902–1903) —Pioneer Finnish socialist paper edited by Martin Hendrickson. Only 4 issues produced, 1 surviving.
- The Liberator (1903) —Published by T.E. Latimer.
- Worker's Voice (1910)
- Oregon Socialist Party Bulletin (1910–1919) —Official organ of SPO. Hardcopy only at University of Oregon.
- The Hourglass (1915)
- Oregon Herald (1916–1917)
- Western Socialist (1919) —Edited by Harry M. Wicks.
- Till Kamp (Into Battle) (1919) —Mimeographed bulletin of Branch 118 of the Scandinavian Socialist Federation. No known surviving copies.
- Oregon Socialist Party News (1945–1947) —Mimeographed.
- Portland Socialist (2003–2007)
  - Portland Current (2007-date)
- The Oregon Socialist (1995, 1999, 2005–2008)

Salem

- Oregon Socialist Searchlight (1950–1952) —Official organ of SPO.
- Expansive Democracy (1995) —Official organ of SPO.

Sources: Carlos A. Schwantes, "Labor-Reform Papers in Oregon, 1871–1976: A Checklist," Pacific Northwest Quarterly, October 1983, pp. 154–166; Dirk Hoerder with Christiane Harzig (eds.), The Immigrant Labor Press in North America, 1840s–1970s: An Annotated Bibliography. In 3 volumes. Westport, CT: Greenwood Press, 1987.

== See also ==
- Socialist Party of Missouri
- Socialist Party of North Dakota
- Socialist Party of Oklahoma
- Socialist Party of Washington
- Social-Democratic Party of Wisconsin
- Finnish Socialist Federation
- Western Workmen's Co-operative Publishing Company
