= Eteenpäin =

Communist Finnish-language newspaper

Eteenpäin (English: Forward) was a Finnish-language daily newspaper launched in New York City in 1921. The paper was the East Coast organ of Finnish-American members of the Communist Party USA. The paper moved to Worcester, Massachusetts in 1922 and to Yonkers, New York in 1931. In 1950 Eteenpäin was merged with the Communist Party's Midwestern Finnish-language daily, Työmies (The Worker) to create Työmies-Eteenpäin, which continued to be published from Superior, Wisconsin into the 1990s.

== Publication history ==
=== Political background ===
In the summer of 1919, the Socialist Party of America (SPA), amidst much acrimony, split into three parts at its 1919 Emergency National Convention. Two new Communist Parties were established, with the moderate Socialist "Regulars" retaining control of the old party name, logo, and assets. In the run-up to this landmark party convention the SPA's governing National Executive Committee had suspended six large foreign language federations for having officially endorsed the Left Wing Manifesto around with the soon-to-be Communist Party dissidents were organizing their forces. This action, coupled with the revocation of the state charters of "left wing" dominated states such as Ohio, Michigan, and Massachusetts, deprived the left wing of its voting majority and assured the Regulars of victory at the convention in Chicago.

This heavy-handed action taken against the non-English-speaking section of the Socialist Party came at a severe cost, however. Even though the Finnish Socialist Federation (SSJ), long regarded as one of the strongest bones in the Socialist Party's body, was not one of those endorsing the Left Wing Manifesto and thus incurring the NEC's wrath, many in the organization were sympathetic to the revolutionary socialist pronouncements of the Left Wing Manifesto and were disgusted by the actions of the NEC.

At its 6th National Convention, held in Waukegan, Illinois from December 25, 1920 to January 2, 1921, the Finnish Socialist Federation after much heated debate voted 16-5 to withdraw from the Socialist Party of America and to continue instead its existence as an independent organization.

Upon learning of the decision of the Waukegan Convention to separate the Finnish Socialist Federation from the party, Socialist Party Executive Secretary Otto Branstetter immediately set about reorganizing a new Finnish Federation for the Socialist Party, an idea which had much support among the branches of the more moderate Eastern District of the Finnish Socialist Federation. In August 1921 a convention was held in Fitchburg, Massachusetts, home of the Eastern District's daily newspaper, Raivaaja (The Pioneer) and a new Finnish Socialist Federation organized.

A large percentage of the Eastern District of the old Finnish Socialist Federation left that organization and joined the reorganized Finnish Socialist Federation affiliated with the SPA, bringing with them their newspaper, Raivaaja. The independent SSJ still had three regular and well established newspapers — the daily Työmies (The Worker), published in the Upper Midwest, and the weeklies Toveri (The Comrade) and Toveritar (The Woman Comrade), published in Oregon. Despite this fact the radical Finnish-Americans of the East still felt they needed a newspaper published at a closer proximity to cover news of local concern and to this end they launched a new publication entitled Eteenpäin (Forward).

=== Formation ===
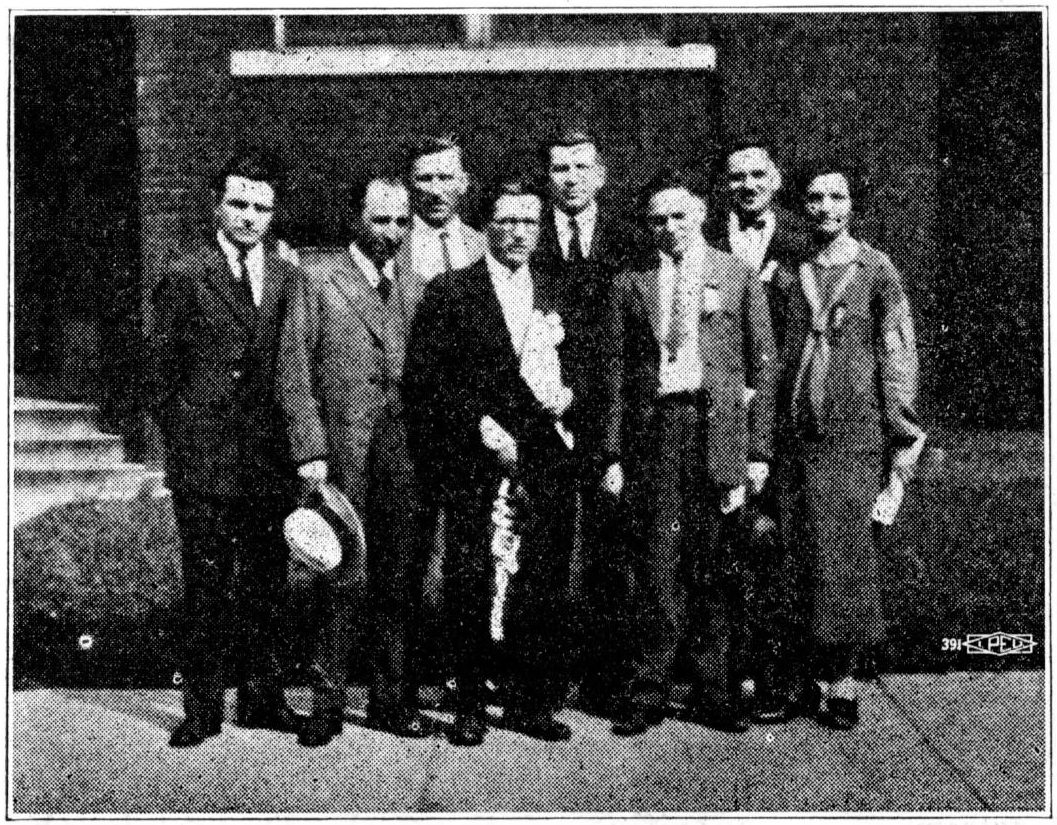
Elis Sulkanen (second from left) among International Labor Defense language section workers, September 5–6, 1926

Eteenpäin was launched in New York City on May 25, 1921 under the editorship of Elis Sulkanen, until recently the editor of Toveri. In an effort to reduce expenses, the publication moved from New York to Worcester, Massachusetts in 1922. There was also a name change of the publisher at this time, with the initial "Bothnia Press Inc." giving way to the "Eteenpäin Co-operative Society."

The paper was typically four pages in length and strongly ideological in its coverage of the news.

There was some limited Finnish presence in the underground Communist Party of America — a shade over 400 dues-paying members by the end of 1921. This number was quite limited and its expansion difficult, however. In the estimation of Finnish Communist leader John Wiita (best known by the pseudonym "Henry Puro"), may Finnish-Americans were suspicious of illegal revolutionary propaganda activities, which they considered outlandish. Eteenpäin editor Elis Sulkanen, himself a participant in the underground Communist movement of 1920-1923, similarly noted that most radical Finns had no desire to join the underground organization, instead seeking to participate in a legal organization realistically participating in the actual politics of the United States.

It was not until the establishment of the above ground and "legal" Workers Party of America (WPA) around New Year's Day of 1922 that Finnish radicals entered the communist movement en masse. The main body of the Finnish Socialist Federation ended its year of independent existence and joined the new WPA as a group at the time of the organization's founding convention, held in New York City. The Finns soon comprised the largest component of the WPA, outnumbering native English speakers and representing 40% of the total party membership by 1923.

Eteenpäin became a part of the WPA at this juncture and it remained a Communist Party publication throughout its nearly three decades of existence.

=== Development ===
Eteenpäin had a circulation of nearly 7,300 in 1924. By 1930, its press run averaged just shy of 11,000 copies per issue.

A number of leading figures in the radical Finnish-American political movement were editors or managers of Eteenpäin over the years, including original editor Sulkanen (later the author of an encyclopedic history of Finnish-American socialism), William Marttila, Toivo Vuorela, Onni Saari, K.E. Heikkinen, and John Wiita (Henry Puro).

In 1931, the publication moved to Yonkers, New York, where it was published by a new holding company called "American Finnish Publishers, Inc."

The publishers of Eteenpäin also issued a number of other Finnish-language radical publications over the years, including a Marxist theoretical magazine Viesti (The Message), a magazine directed at women called Työläisnainen (The Working Woman), and the annuals Punainen Kalenteri (Red Calendar), Vappu (May Day), and Työmiehen Joulu (Worker's Christmas).

=== Merger and legacy ===
In 1950, Eteenpäin was essentially dissolved when it was merged into Työmies, with the "new" joint publication (called Työmies-Eteenpäin) being published from Työmies' Superior, Wisconsin offices. This paper continued through 1995, when it was replaced by the English-language publication, The Finnish-American Reporter.

Eteenpäin has been preserved almost in its totality. Microfilm of Työmies-Eteenpäin (1950–1995) is available from the Wisconsin Historical Society at the University of Wisconsin.

== See also ==
- Finnish Socialist Federation
