= Picture superiority effect =

Psychological phenomenon

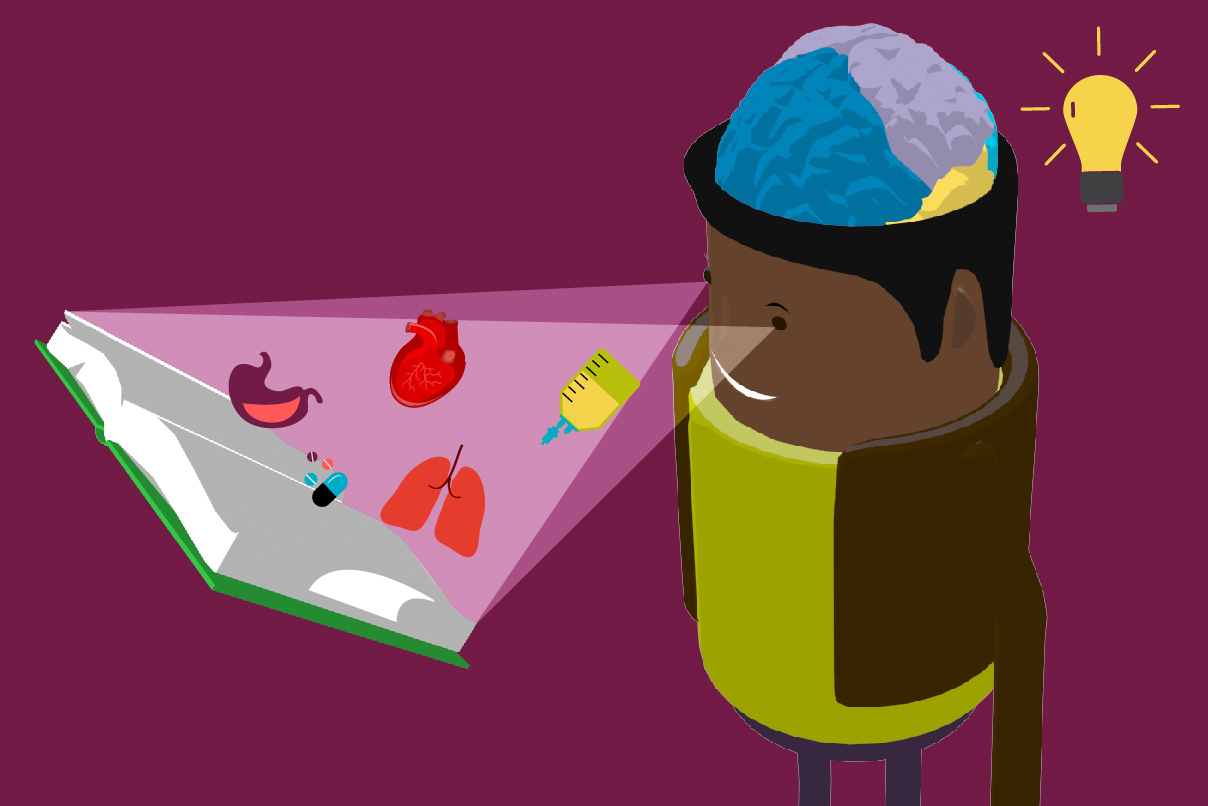
Visual storytelling by Suhani Gowan

The picture superiority effect refers to the phenomenon in which pictures and images are more likely to be remembered than words. This effect has been demonstrated in numerous experiments using different methods. It is based on the notion that "human memory is extremely sensitive to the symbolic modality of presentation of event information." Explanations for the picture superiority effect are not concrete and are still being debated, however an evolutionary explanation is that sight has a long history stretching back millions of years and was crucial to survival in the past, whereas reading is a relatively recent invention, and requires specific cognitive processes, such as decoding symbols and linking them to meaning.

== History ==
Allan Paivio's dual-coding theory is a basis of picture superiority effect. Paivio claims that pictures have advantages over words with regards to coding and retrieval of stored memory because pictures are coded more easily and can be retrieved from symbolic mode, while the dual coding process using words is more difficult for both coding and retrieval. Another explanation of the higher recall in picture superiority is the higher familiarity or frequency of pictured objects (Asch & Ebenholtz, 1962). According to dual-coding theory (1971, 1986), memory exists either (or both) verbally or through imagery. Concrete concepts presented as pictures are encoded into both systems; however, abstract concepts are recorded only verbally. In psychology, the effect has implications for salience in attribution theory as well as the availability heuristic. It is also relevant to advertising and user interface design.

== Related theories ==
=== Paivio – Dual coding theory ===
Picture stimuli have an advantage over word stimuli because they are dually encoded; they generate a verbal and image code, whereas word stimuli only generate a verbal code. Pictures are likely to generate a verbal label, whereas words are not likely to generate image labels.

=== Nelson – Sensory semantic theory ===
Pictures hold two encoding advantages over words. Pictures are perceptually more distinct from one another than words, thus increasing their chance for retrieval. In experiments when similarity among pictures was high, no picture superiority effect was present. Pictures are also believed to assess meaning more directly than words. Levels of processing theory apply when words and pictures are compared under semantic study instructions (rate the pleasantness of each item), recall is very similar for pictures and words, as both were encoded at deeper levels.

Picture superiority results from superior encoding for pictures over words, which facilitates greater recollection of pictures.

=== Weldon and Roediger-transfer appropriate processing theories ===
Greater overlap of processing at study and test result in increased performance. TAP accounts for picture superiority by an interaction of encoding and retrieval. If items are encoded during a semantic task, performance should be higher for a memory test that relies on concepts related to the items for retrieval than a test that relies on perceptual features.

== Evidence ==
This effect has been shown to occur in recognition memory tasks, where items studied as pictures are better remembered than items studied as words, even when targets are presented as words during the test phase. Whether the picture superiority effect influences the familiarity and/or recollection processes, according to the dual-process models, thought to underlie recognition memory is not clear.

In experiments of associative recognition memory, participants studied random concrete word pairs, and line drawing pairs. They had to discriminate between intact and rearranged pairs at test. The picture superiority effect continued to express a strong effect with a greater hit rate for intact picture pairs. This further supports encoding theories More recent research in associative recognition shows support that semantic meaning of nameable pictures is activated faster than that of words, allowing for more meaningful associations between items depicted as pictures to be generated.

Pictures have distinctive features that enable to distinguish pictures from words and such discriminability increase memory ability in comparison with verbal cues. Picture Superiority effect was also evident for memory recall during semantic procession. Moreover, pictures in pairs or group were better organized in our memory than words thus resulting in superiority in recall. The picture superiority effect is also present in spatial memory, where locations of items and photographs were remembered better than locations of words.

== Critique ==
The advantage of pictures over words is only evident when visual similarity is a reliable cue; because it takes longer to understand pictures than words. Pictures are only superior to words for list learning because differentiation is easier for pictures. In reverse picture superiority it was observed that learning was much slower when the responses were pictures. Words produced a faster response than pictures and pictures did not have an advantages of having easier access to semantic memory or superior effect over words for dual-coding theory. Similarly, studies where response time deadlines have been implemented, the reverse superiority effect was reported. This is related to the dual-process model of familiarity and recollection. When deadlines for the response were short, the process of familiarity was present, along with an increased tendency to recall words over pictures. When response deadlines were longer, the process of recollection was being utilized, and a strong picture superiority effect was present. In addition, equivalent response time was reported for pictures and words for intelligence comparison. Contrary to the assumption that pictures have faster access to the same semantic code than words do; all semantic information is stored in a single system. The only difference is that pictures and words access different features of the semantic code.

== With age ==
Across the lifespan, a gradual development of the picture superiority effect is evident. Some studies have shown that it appears to become more pronounced with age, while others have found that this effect is also observed among younger children.). However, the major contribution in picture superiority in recognition memory among children was familiarity. During childhood, specifically among seven-year-olds, the picture superiority effect is lesser in magnitude than in other age groups. This could be due to the lack of inner speech among younger children supporting the dual coding theory of Paivio. In healthy older adults, the picture superiority effect was found to be greater than it was for younger adults, in comparison to recognition for words, which was disadvantaged for older adults. In that regard, seniors can benefit from using pictorial information to retain textual information. While memory for words is impaired for older adults, pictures help restore their impaired memory and function properly. In addition, older adults have shown the same level of capability for identifying correct items in comparison with young adults when items were accompanied with pictures (Smith, Hunt & Dunlap, 2015). In populations with Alzheimer's disease, and other mild cognitive impairments, the picture superiority effect remains evident. ERP activity indicates that patients with amnesic mild cognitive impairment utilized frontal-lobe based memory processes to support successful recognition for pictures, which was similar to healthy controls, but not for words.

== Applications ==
- Education (language learning): Learners can structure a mental model when processing a picture initially so that no further model construction may be required for subsequent processing of a text. Presenting picture before text is beneficial to students with low prior knowledge (Eitel & Scheiter, 2015). In a similar vein, reading a picture prior to processing textual information improves comprehension levels for students with low prior knowledge (Salmerón, Baccino, Cañas, Madrid, & Fajardo, 2009). Pictures can be more effective than word translation for language learning when individuals are not overconfident in the mnemonic power of pictures (Carpenter & Olson, 2011). If they are overconfident, pictures lose superiority over words.
- Health communication: A study by Ally, Gold and Budson (2009) confirm that picture superiority effect was observed among mild Alzheimer's disease (AD) and amnestic-type mild cognitive impairment (MC). Pictures have a significantly positive effect on four areas of communication: attention, comprehension, recall, and intention/adherence. Health education materials can benefit greatly by adding pictures as pictures can be especially beneficial for people who lack literacy skill (Houts, C.Doak, L.Doak &Loscalzo, 2006). Picture superiority effect can be implemented in creating materials for health communication that inclusion of fearful or disgusting images led to improved recognition memory in comparison with the condition without a presence of image (Leshner, Vultee, Bolls & Moore, 2010).
- Advertising: Percy and Rossiter (1997, p. 295) stated, "The picture is the most important structural element in magazine advertising, for both consumer and business audiences." Visually framed messages were more effective under the condition where the audience was less motivated and had less ability to process information semantically. Visual ads require less exposure than verbal ads for long-term memory effect (Childers & Houston, 1984). The pictorial component in the ad is more likely to be viewed before words, and it generates an expectation for the verbal component of the ad (Houston, Childers & Heckler, 1987). Maximizing the size of pictures regardless of advertising contents will improve attention to the entire advertisement as pictures draw significant attention to baseline in the ads (Pieters & Wedel, 2004).

== Proposed model ==
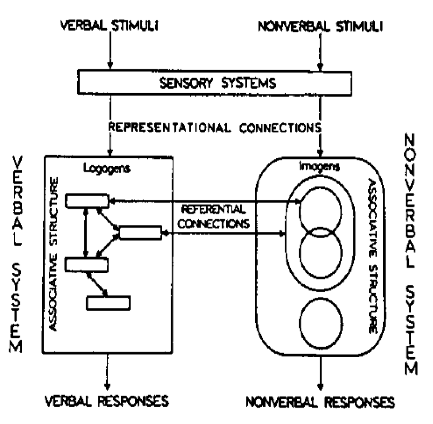
Dual coding process by Clark and Paivio (1991)

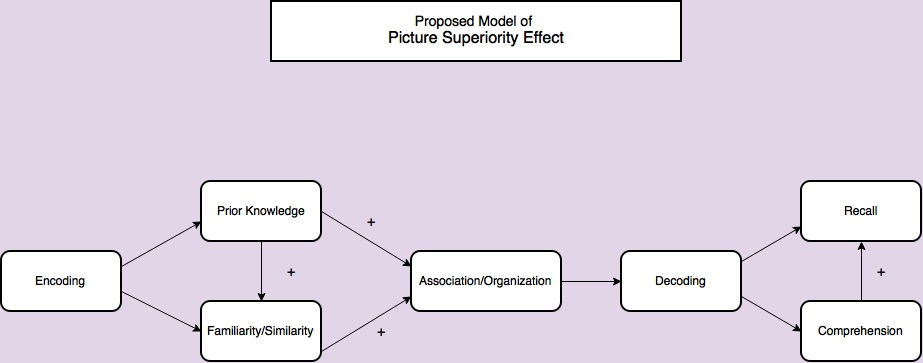
Proposed Model of Picture Superiority Effect by Sung Eun Park

== See also ==
- A picture is worth a thousand words – Adage
- Dual process model – Psychological theory of how thought can arise in two different ways
- Infographic – Graphic visual representation of information
- List of cognitive biases
- Memory bias
- Pictogram – Ideogram that conveys its meaning through its pictorial resemblance to a physical object
- Visual rhetoric – Communication through visual elements
