= Kansan Lehti =

Finnish newspaper

- Type: Regional newspaper
- Founded: December 1898
- Ceased publication: 1991
- Political alignment: Social democratic
- Language: Finnish
- Headquarters: Tampere
- Country: Finland

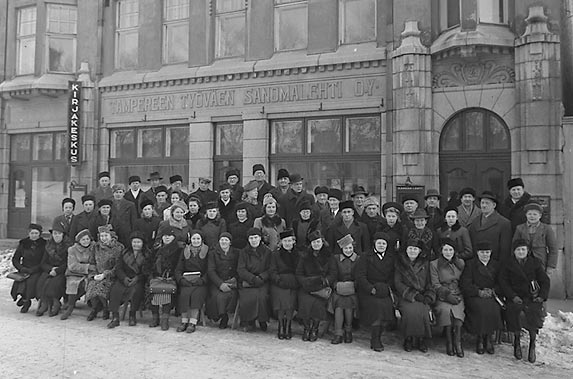
Kansan Lehti employees at its forty-fifth anniversary.

Kansan Lehti (Finnish: People’s Newspaper) was a social democratic newspaper published in Tampere from 1898 until 1991. The first issue of the paper appeared in December 1898. In the early period it was a handwritten publication and had a socialist political stance. During this period it came out six times per week and sold nearly 10,000 copies. Over time the paper became affiliated with the Social Democratic Party. One of its financial managers was Vihtori Kosonen who began to serve in the post in 1906.
