= William Smaldone =

American educator (born 1958)

William "Bill" Smaldone (born 1958) is the E. J. Whipple Professor of European history at Willamette University in Salem, Oregon, United States.

== Education and career ==
Bill Smaldone received his Bachelor of Science (1980) and Master of Arts (1983) degrees from the State University of New York at Brockport.

He received his Ph.D. in Modern European History from Binghamton University. From 1989-1991, following the completion of his Ph.D., Smaldone took up an academic post as a visiting professor at Rampo College in New Jersey. In 1991, he moved to Salem, Oregon and joined the history department faculty at Willamette University.

== Public service ==
In the mid-1990s, he initially became active in Oregon's local politics as a member of the Socialist Party of Oregon and in 1998 was elected to the Salem City Council where he served on the Budget Committee and numerous commissions. In 2001, Smaldone served as Council President until his re-election bid loss to Jim Randall in 2002. Smaldone attributes the defeat to old-fashioned "red-baiting" tactics reminiscent of Cold War America by stating, "Jim Randall and his allies knew that anti-socialist rhetoric still resonated with a large part of the populace. Using that theme, they succeeded in mobilizing their supporters more effectively than we did ours."

== Published works ==
=== Academic books ===
- Smaldone, William (2008). Confronting Hitler: German Social Democrats in Defense of the Weimar Republic, 1929-1933. Lexington Books. December 2008. ISBN 0-7391-2843-4
- Smaldone, William (1998). Rudolf Hilferding: The Tragedy of a German Social Democrat. Northern Illinois University Press. July 1998. ISBN 0-87580-236-2

=== Academic articles ===
- (2010) Smaldone, William. "Rise of the Left Party: Germany's Election and Beyond." Against the Current, January/February, No. 144.
- (2007) Smaldone, William. "Socialist Paths in a Capitalist Conundrum: Reconsidering the German Catastrophe of 1933." Journal of World History 18.3: 297-323. Print.
- (2007) Smaldone, William. "German Social Democracy in the Great Coalition." Against the Current, May/June, No. 128.
- (2004) Smaldone, William. "German Social Democracy in Crisis." Against the Current, September/October, No. 112.
- (2002) Smaldone, William. "Friedrich Stampfer and the Fall of the Weimar Republic." The Historian 64.3/4: 687-703. Web.
- (2000) Smaldone, William. "Facing Fascism in Europe." Against the Current, January/February, No. 84. Print.
