= Western Workmen's Co-operative Publishing Company =

Socialist newspaper and book publisher in Oregon

Employees of the Western Workmen's Co-operative Publishing Company in front of the Toveri offices, Astoria, Oregon, 1913.

The Western Workman's Co-operative Publishing Company, established in 1907, was a Finnish-language socialist newspaper and book publisher located in Astoria, Oregon, on the Pacific coast of the United States of America. The firm produced the newspapers Toveri (The Comrade), Toveritar (The Woman Comrade), periodicals designed for young readers, as well as books.

Targeted to a national female audience rather than a local readership, the weekly Toveritar (established 1911) would soon gain a larger circulation than the more frequently issued Toveri, which went to a daily publication schedule in 1912.

With circulation declining and the Communist Party, USA seeking to consolidate operations, the Western Workmen's Co-operative Publishing Company was terminated in 1931. The western regional organ Toveri was absorbed by the long-running Finnish-language radical daily, Työmies (The Worker), published in Superior, Wisconsin, while the national women's paper Toveritar was relaunched there as Työlaisnainen (Working Woman). The company's presses were exported to Leningrad in the Soviet Union where they were placed at the disposal of the Finnish-language Kirja publishing house.

== History ==
=== Establishment of Toveri ===
The banner of Toveri during its first 15 years featured the joined hands over a globe logo of the Socialist Party of America. The paper went to a daily publication schedule in 1912.

The Western Workmen's Co-operative Publishing Company was established in Astoria, Oregon in 1907 by individuals closely associated with the Finnish Socialist Federation to supply radical literature in the Finnish-language to readers throughout the American West. The westernmost publishing center of the Finnish Socialist Federation (SSJ), centered around the newspaper Työmies (The Worker) in Superior, Wisconsin, was deemed too far distant to provide timely news coverage of events of the Finnish-American population on the Pacific Coast and a referendum of SSJ locals in the western region voted in favor of establishing a new publication.

On June 9, 1907, following the spring referendum on the matter, a temporary board of directors was established in Astoria to organize the formation of the new newspaper. Astoria was not the pre-ordained choice for the location of the forthcoming newspaper, as the provisional board determined that the press would be located in the town from which the greatest money for capitalization could be raised. Provision was made for the issuance of $5,000 of capital stock, to be sold in 500 shares priced at $10 each, and on July 24, 1907, the venture was formally incorporated.

Astoria's large Finnish population was especially energized by the new project and shares of stock sold there, in the words of one board member, "like glasses of wine in a dry state." A total of $2,500 was raised by October 20, allowing the project to legally proceed, and stockholders met to choose an editor and business manager for the publication. Aku Kissanen, a prominent member of the Social Democratic Party of Finland who had been recently forced to flee Finland following the failure of the Russian Revolution of 1905, was chosen as the first editor of the new newspaper. Väinö Riipa was selected as the paper's first business manager and given the task of acquiring a printing press in Portland, hiring typographers and press workers, and establishing a printing facility in Astoria.

On December 7, 1907, the first issue of the new bi-weekly newspaper, Toveri (The Comrade), rolled off the press. The publication's initial bi-weekly schedule proved to be little more than a fiction during its first financially challenged months of operation, however, with finances strapped by the Panic of 1907, and a regular publication schedule was only possible the following year.

During its first year of operation, Toveri attracted about 1,700 subscribers. The front page featured world news, frequently translated from English newspapers, with an editorial page appearing on page 2. The paper's size fluctuated from 4 to 8 pages, with the rest of the publication's content consisting of local Astoria news, correspondence from various Finnish-American communities in the western region, and advertising.

The paper moved from a bi-weekly to a daily publication schedule in 1912. In 1917, in response to perceived bias in Astoria's English language press of a Lower Columbia ship-workers' strike, Toveri launched a short-lived English language section.

By 1916 Toveri's circulation reached the 4,000 mark — which while small compared to the press runs of Työmies and the Massachusetts Finnish-language socialist daily, Raivaaja (The Pioneer), nevertheless allowed the paper to tout itself on its masthead as maintaining a circulation "greater than the combined circulation of all other newspapers printed in Astoria."

=== Launch of Toveritar ===
The banner of some early issues of Toveritar featured the arm-and-torch alternative logo of the Socialist Party of America. The paper maintained a national readership and had a larger circulation than Toveri.

In July 1911 a newspaper clearly of national scope was launched by the Finnish Socialist Federation through the Western Workmen's Co-operative Publishing Company — the weekly newspaper Toveritar (The Woman Comrade). The paper, which varied in size from 8 to 16 pages, was first edited by former member of the Finnish parliament Maiju Raunio and was targeted to a Finnish-speaking female audience, including not only discussion of radical theory and history but matter concerning family affairs, household economy, and literature by women.

The weekly was launched with a press run of 3,000 and soon grew to be the largest circulation publication of the Western Workmen's Co-operative Publishing Company, hitting the 5,000 mark in 1912; the 8,000 mark in 1920; and peaking with a circulation of 12,000 in 1926.

In association with Toveritar there were special annual magazines produced for a juvenile audience, including Lasten Kevät (Children's Spring) and Lasten Joulu (Children's Christmas).

=== Other publications ===
The Western Workmen's Co-operative Publishing Company supplemented its income by working locally in Astoria as a job printer. It additionally was hired by the Finnish Socialist Federation (SSJ) to print pamphlets, books, and magazines on behalf of the organization, including from 1913 the glossy annual literary magazine Vappu (May Day). Book printing on behalf of the SSJ included works of socialist poetry, fiction by Henry Askeli, and Finnish translations of socialist pamphlets by luminaries of the Socialist Party of America, including The Law and White Slavery by Kate Richards O'Hare.

=== Editors ===
Debut editor Aku Kissanen left Toveri in July 1908, only to return for a second stint in the editorial desk in 1910. He was replaced in 1911 by Santeri Nuorteva, one of the leading lights in the Finnish Socialist Federation. Nuorteva would be succeeded in 1913 by yet another prominent figure in the SSJ, John Viita, who would in turn be replaced by veteran journalist Eemeli Parras, a former member of the staff at both Raivaaja and Työmies.

In 1915 Parras would depart from Toveri, to be replaced by William Reivo, a light-hearted socialist who would figure large in the history of the SSJ as the leader of its moderate wing following the 1919 split into Socialist and Communist factions.

Other important figures who would work on the staff of Toveri included A. B. Mäkelä, an assistant editor from 1917 to 1918 who was a well-known humorist both in Finland and the United States and who had been a close associate of utopian socialist Matti Kurikka during his earlier colonization efforts, and Henry Askeli, later head of the Finnish Federation and briefly prominent in the American Communist movement.

The editor Helmi Mattson, a writer of essays, fiction, and poetry, headed Toveritar through the 1920s and 1930s.

=== Centralization ===
With factional warfare emerging in the Finnish Federation in 1919, following the 3-for-1 split of the Socialist Party of America into the Socialist, Communist, and Communist Labor parties, the 1920 convention of the SSJ moved to place federation newspapers more tightly under central control, with the executive committee of the federation given approval over the hiring and firing of personnel. The editorial policy of the paper was moved into the Communist orbit and increasing space was given to news coverage of events in Soviet Russia, Marxist theory, and translations of Soviet writers.

In December 1922, a major fire in Astoria disrupted publication of two local newspapers, the Daily Astorian and the Budget. The papers continued publication with the aid of the facilities of Toveri and the Seaside Signal.

=== Termination ===
With its circulation having fallen to 3,000 at the end of 1930, down from a peak of about 5,600 eight years earlier, Toveri was terminated through merger with the Communist Party's midwestern Finnish-language newspaper, Työmies. The final issue was published dated February 28, 1931.

Toveritar was likewise moved to Superior, Wisconsin, at this time, where it continued to be produced out of the offices of Työmies under a new name, Työlaisnainen (Working Woman). Another name change was forthcoming in 1936, when the paper was rechristened Naisten Viiri (Woman's Banner). The paper continued in production from Superior until June 1978, at which time it was terminated and briefly converted into a section of the Communist Party's faltering Finnish-language weekly, Työmies-Eteenpain.

With many radical Finnish-Americans emigrating to Soviet Karelia in an attempt to escape the ill effects of the Great Depression at this time, the printing press which published Toveri and Toveritar was likewise crated up in Astoria and shipped abroad, winding up in Leningrad under the control there of the Finnish-language Kirja publishing house.
