= Henry Askeli =

Finnish-American draftsman, labor activist and therapist (1886–1962)

Henry Askeli in his 20s.

Philip Henry Askeli (March 24, 1886 – March 13, 1962) was a Finnish American draftsman, labor activist and therapist.

== Biography ==
Askeli was born on the island of Hailuoto in North Ostrobothnia, Finland; his parents were John (Juho) Askeli Jr. (1861–1934) and Kaisa Stiina (née Kallsten; 1848–1923) from Hailuoto. He attended elementary school and moved to the United States in 1900. He studied at the Lockwood School of Art in Kalamazoo, Michigan from 1908 to 1909, the New York College of Art and Design from 1915 to 1916, and the Chicago Academy of Art in 1918. From 1916 to 1917 he worked for the Duluth News Tribune.

Askeli joined the labor movement at a young age. He worked as a journalist for Toveri from 1912 to 1915, as secretary general of the Finnish Socialist Federation of America from 1917 to 1922, and as a journalist for Työmies from 1924 to 1927 (and was the paper's editor until 1925). From 1922 to 1923, Askeli worked in Petrozavodsk, Karelia and from 1927 to 1929 he headed the education department of the Co-operative Trading Association in Brooklyn. In the 1920s, Askeli belonged to the Communist Party of the United States, from which he was expelled along with its opposition in 1928. He was later a member of the social democratic Finnish American League for Democracy.

After his political career, Askeli worked as a physiotherapist in Boston, Rhode Island, and Hyannis, and he owned a clinic in West Yarmouth, Massachusetts. He received his doctorate in natural medicine from Taylor University in Chattanooga in 1939. He also wrote works related to the field.

Askeli died in Hyannis, Massachusetts, on March 13, 1962, at the age of 76.

== Works ==
- Kaskuja 1 ("Anecdotes 1"). Astoria: s.n., 1915. (in Finnish)
- Syökäämme oikein: johdatus ravintotieteeseen ("Let's Eat Right: An Introduction to Nutrition Science"). Fitchburg: Raivaaja kustannusyhtiö, 1933. (in Finnish)
- Yksi päivä kuluttajan elämässä: kolmiosainen osuustoiminnallinen kuvaelma ("A Day in the Life of a Consumer: A Three-part Cooperative Tableau"). Fitchburg: Raivaaja Pub. Co, 1936. (in Finnish)
- How to Know Yourself: Ninety Days to Good Health. Philadelphia: Dorrance, 1960.
