= Sanna Kannasto =

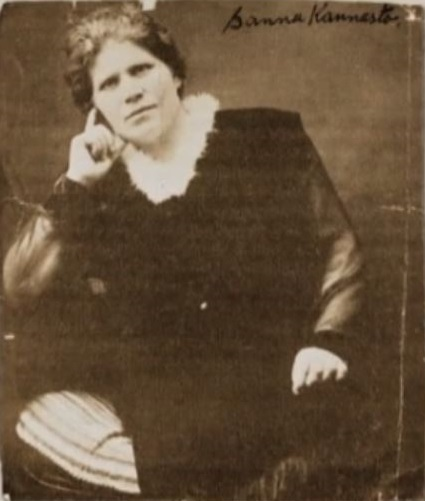
- Sanna Kannasto in the 1920s
- Born: Sanna Kallio; 1878; Ylihärmä Finland
- Died: 1968 (aged 89–90); Canada
- Education: Suomi College
- Occupation: Social Activist

Sanna Kannasto (née Kallio; 1878–1968) was a Finnish Canadian labour activist and feminist. With A.T. Hill and Aku Päiviö she was one of the key figures in the Finnish Canadian socialist movement of the early 1900s. Authorities considered Kannasto as one of the most dangerous agitators in Canada. She was also active in the Canadian suffragette movement.

== Life ==
Kannasto was born in Ylihärmä, Grand Duchy of Finland. She emigrated to United States in 1899 and studied at the Suomi College in Hancock, Michigan. In 1905 Kannasto joined the Socialist Party of America working as a writer and speaker. Two years later she moved to Port Arthur, Ontario with her spouse J.V. Kannasto. Although Kannasto used the surname of her spouse, they were never married. Living together without marriage was a common habit among radical Finns in North America.

In 1908 Kannasto became the first paid organizer in the Finnish-Canadian socialist movement. Her job was to recruit Finnish workers to join the Socialist Party and later the Social Democratic Party. Kannasto helped establishing the Finnish Organization of Canada (FOC) in 1911. It was first associated with the Social Democratic Party and later with the Communist Party of Canada. In three years FOC had more than 3,000 members in 64 locals across the country, some 500 of them were women. Kannasto travelled across the country at least five times and made a large number of shorter journeys. She spoke to the Finns in the remote mining towns, rural areas, and lumber camps. Kannasto held also additional meetings for women guiding them on women's role in the labour movement and even discussed about more intimate issues such as marriage life and birth control. She was respected by both men and women as well as among English-speaking socialists, although she didn't speak much English.

Canadian authorities viewed Kannasto as one of the country's most dangerous agitators and the Royal Canadian Mounted Police wanted to deport her. They started to follow Kannasto and finally she was arrested in early 1920 on her way to Manyberries, Alberta. After her release Kannasto continued her work. She was later arrested at least once, in May 1925 in the United States while she was speaking in Hibbing, Minnesota. Kannasto was accused of illegal entry. She was forced to leave her political activities in the early 1930s due to the continuous harassment by the Canadian authorities. Kannasto died in Canada in 1968.

== Film ==
A Canadian-Finnish documentary drama Under the Red Star was released in 2011. It is a story about union organizers and Finnish refugees who fled to Canada after the 1918 Civil War. Sanna Kannasto is played by Finnish actress Elena Leeve.

== Sources ==
- Varpu Lindström-Best: "Defiant Sisters – A Social History of Finnish Immigrant Women in Canada", p. 149–152 Multicultural Canada
