= Vihtori Kosonen =

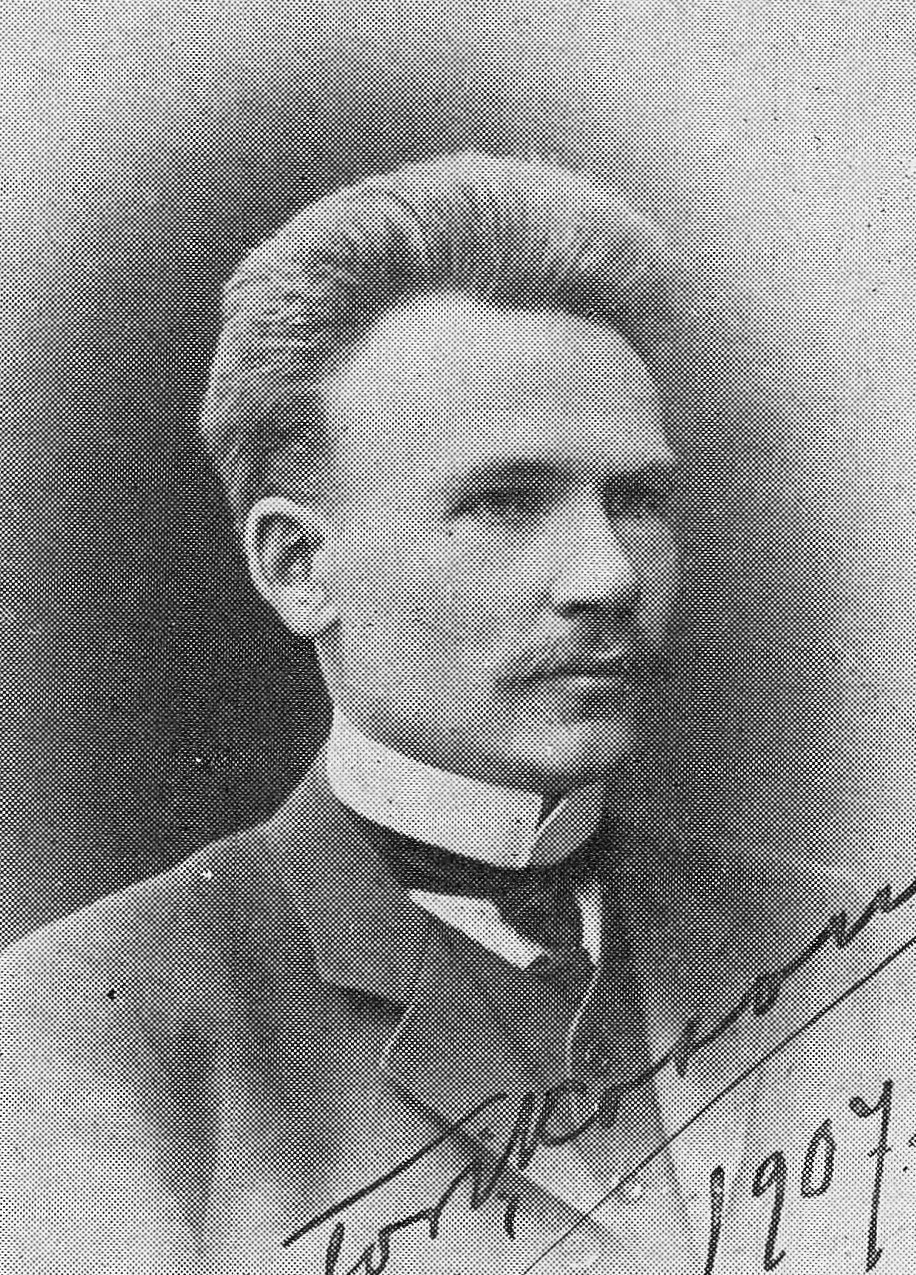
Vihtori Kosonen in 1907

Vihtori Kosonen (1873–1934) was a Finnish journalist, publisher, and free-thinker.

Kosonen first worked as an editor at the Työmies newspaper, which was founded in 1895. In 1898, he was forced to leave Finland due to the anti-socialist policies of the Finnish government under Russian governor Nikolay Bobrikov. He fled to America, where he became an influential figure in the American–Finnish workers' movement. From 1903, he was the editor of the American Työmies newspaper.

Kosonen decided to return to Finland in 1905. He was involved in the activities of the Social Democratic Party, and served as editor of the Kansan Lehti newspaper. During the 1905 Russian revolution, Kosonen organised shelter for refugees from the Baltic region of the Russian Empire, also helped organise the December 1905 Tampere bolshevik conference. In February 1906, he helped Latvian revolutionary Jānis Čoke, who was later revealed to have taken part in the robbery of the Russian State Bank branch in Helsinki.
