= Thure Svedlin =

Finland-Swedish publisher, military officer and author (1891–1959)

- Born: Thure William Svedlin; 20 February 1891; Nykarleby, Grand Duchy of Finland
- Died: 30 September 1959 (aged 68); Helsinki, Finland
- Occupations: Publisher, military officer, author
- Employer: Holger Schildts förlag
- Known for: Managing director of Holger Schildts förlag (1931–1959)
- Spouse: Elin Savander (m. 1918)

Thure William Svedlin (20 February 1891 – 30 September 1959) was a Finland Swede publisher, military officer and author. He was active in the Jäger movement during the First World War and participated in the Finnish Civil War on the White side. From 1931 until his death in 1959 he served as managing director of Holger Schildts förlag, the leading Finland-Swedish literary publisher.

== Biography ==
=== Jäger movement and Civil War ===
Svedlin studied at the University of Helsinki and became involved in student activist circles, participating actively in the Jäger movement. In the spring of 1915 he completed a Pfadfinder course in Germany, after which he worked at the recruitment office in Stockholm as an associate of the historian and activist Herman Gummerus from 1915 to 1917.

Returning to Finland in 1917, Svedlin organised activist activities in support of the independence movement. He was among those responsible for establishing the military training schools in Vindala and Vörå, and from February 1918 he was responsible for the secret procurement of weapons for the White Guard in Helsinki. He also participated actively in the capture of Helsinki in April 1918 as a member of the White Guard headquarters staff in the capital.

After the war, Svedlin was appointed chief of staff of the Uusimaa Military District and tasked with organising White Guard training across Finland. He also authored several propaganda works in support of the White side.

=== Journalism and publishing ===
From 1917 to 1918 Svedlin served on the editorial staff of the Helsinki newspaper Svenska Tidningen, and from 1919 to 1921 as its managing director. In 1922 he joined Holger Schildts förlag, becoming deputy director in 1928–1930 and managing director in 1931, a post he held until his death.

During the final phase of the Continuation War in 1944, Svedlin was part of the right-wing circle around the newspaper Svensk Botten. This group planned and published the daily newspaper Aftonposten, which appeared six times a week from July 1944 to May 1945. The same circle also organised a counter-petition to the Peace address of the 33 in 1943, which gathered over 6,500 signatures.

=== Writing ===
Svedlin co-edited the eight-volume participant account Finlands frihetskrig (Finland's War of Liberation, 1921–1928) and authored several books of his own, including Frihetskriget i översikt (The War of Liberation in Overview, 1938), published to mark the twentieth anniversary of the Civil War and issued in Finnish translation by Otava the following year.
