= Raivaaja =

Former Finnish newspaper

- Format: Broadsheet
- Publisher: Raivaaja Publishing Company
- Founded: Jan. 1905
- Ceased publication: 2009
- Language: Finnish (Finnish and English in later years.)
- Headquarters: 164 Elm St. Fitchburg, Massachusetts
- OCLC number: 13677702
- Website: raivaaja.org

Raivaaja (English: The Pioneer) was a Finnish-language newspaper published from 1905 to 2009 in Fitchburg, Massachusetts, by Raivaaja Publishing Company. For the first three decades of its existence the publication was closely associated with the Socialist Party of America (SPA). In 1936 as part of a large factional split in the SPA, the former Finnish Socialist Federation severed its connection to become the "Finnish American League for Democracy," with Raivaaja remaining the official organ of this remodeled organization.

During its final years the publication included both English language and Finnish language content. It was last edited by Marita Cauthen from 1984 until its termination in 2009. Today the not-for-profit Raivaaja Foundation still runs a website and an online bookstore.

== History ==
=== Establishment ===
The history of the broadsheet newspaper Raivaaja (The Pioneer) is traceable to an earlier publication, Pohjan Tähti (The North Star), which was started in the Finnish-American enclave of Fitchburg, Massachusetts by a private entrepreneur, Alex Heisson, who sought to launch a profitable publication to serve the community's large and growing Finnish-speaking population. Taking a calculated political risk, the aspiring capitalist publisher hired a talented socialist editor, émigré Finnish newcomer Taavi Tainio. For a time the alliance seemed to be working, with the profit-seeking, nominally socialist publication quickly growing to a circulation of nearly 4,000. By the end of the year differences over the function and goals of the paper led to Heisson terminating his outspoken editor.

The popular Taino's firing led to a spate of organizational activity by local Fitchburg socialists, who sought to establish a new publication with a more definite socialist orientation under Taino's direction. A mass meeting was held on January 1, 1905, at which it was decided to move forward with such a venture, and a board of directors was elected. Fundraising was begun, reaching the $100 mark by the end of January, and a room was rented to serve as the provisional office for the new publication — ironically located directly across a corridor from the office of Pohjan Tähti in an office building in downtown Fitchburg.

On January 31, 1905, the new socialist newspaper, Raivaaja (The Pioneer) rolled off the press. The paper soon became a mainstay of the Finnish Socialist Federation, which joined the Socialist Party of America following a convention held in the summer of 1906. The initial subscription rate was set at $1.25 per year, postpaid through the mail, with fixed costs of approximately $300 per month projected, including a salary of $12 per week to be paid to editor Tainio.

Rather than being owned by the Finnish Socialist Federation, Raivaaja was published by a holding company known as the Finnish Socialist Publishing Company (Suomalainen Sosialistinen Kustannusyhtiö). This entity formally changed its name in 1929 to the more familiar Raivaaja Publishing Company. The circulation of the publication during its first year of existence was approximately 2,000 copies per issue.

=== Affiliations and ideology ===
Web press used for the production of Raivaaja, 1915. Pictured next to the press is the pressman, Anton Victor Lehtonen (1880–1945.)

In its early years, Raivaaja was a radical newspaper loyal to the Socialist Party of America. It was the newspaper of the Finnish Socialist Federation's eastern district. The other papers were Työmies in the middle district, and Toveri in the west. During the World War I the War Department agents searched Raivaaja's offices because of its radical and anti-war ideas. In the early 1920s Raivaaja moved to a moderate social democratic position during the factional war of the Finnish Socialist Federation. The paper peaked with a circulation of 10,000 in 1927 before a long downward slide. The list of editors include major names of Finnish American labor movement such as Moses Hahl, Santeri Nuorteva, Aku Päiviö, Frans Josef Syrjälä and Oskari Tokoi.

In 1936, in response to a split of the Socialist Party which saw more conservative elements leave to establish the Social Democratic Federation, the Finnish Socialist Federation similarly remade itself as the "Finnish American League for Democracy." Although the underlying Finnish-American organization supporting the paper remained the same, Raivaaja also severed its connection from the Socialist Party from this date.

In its last years, Raivaaja was a non-political newspaper of the Finnish-American community.

=== Frequency and circulation ===
Throughout the course of its existence, the frequency of Raivaaja varied over time. The paper launched in 1905 with a semi-weekly frequency, moving to three issues per week in 1907 before expanding to a daily publication schedule (except Sundays) in 1910.

From its initial press run of about 2,000, Raivaaja grew to a circulation of 8,300 by the end of its first decade. Despite two bitter splits of the Finnish Socialist Federation, featuring the departure of industrial unionists close to the Industrial Workers of the World (IWW) in 1914-1915 and to the group's communist wing in 1919–1921, the paper continued to maintain its readership, hitting a circulation of 10,000 in 1927. This proved to be the high-water mark for the publication, however, as restrictions to American immigration law imposed in the 1920s virtually halted Finnish-speaking newcomers for many years.

With the restriction of immigration into the United States in the 1920s, the coming of the Great Depression in 1929, and the ensuing depression decade, readership of the Finnish language press in the United States began to atrophy. In the two decades from 1920 to 1940, the number of Finnish speakers in America who were born abroad fell by 27 percent, declining to just over 117,000 — constricting possible readership. Second generation Finnish-Americans, importantly, gravitated towards the English language press rather than to Raivaaja and the host of other Finnish language papers published in the USA.

Raivaaja's daily schedule was maintained throughout the 1940s, when the paper began appearing less frequently due to declining circulation and revenue. During the 1960s the paper was being issued only three times a week, with a further decline to semi-weekly and later weekly status in the 1970s.

By 1950 the circulation of the newspaper had fallen to 5,750, with further attrition following until by the middle of the 1970s a plateau of just over 2,000 copies was reached. This same figure would be claimed by the publication more than a quarter century later.

=== Final years ===
From 1984 until its termination in April 2009, the paper was edited by Marita Cauthen. The paper ran both English-language and Finnish-language content during its final years.

The paper was finally ceased in April 2009 due to the increase of the postage rates.

== Editors-in-chief ==
- Taavi Tainio (1874–1929) - Founding editor, 1905.
- Aku Päiviö (1879–1956) - Editor-in-chief from June 1905 to Spring 1906.
- A. B. Mäkelä (1863–1932) - Editor-in-chief from Spring 1906 to September 1907.
- Johan Kock (1861–1915) - Editor-in-chief for seven weeks in the fall of 1907.
- Frans Joseph Syrjälä (1880–1931) - Editor-in-chief from November 1907 to his death in August 1931, with short absences.
- Leo Laukki (1880–1938) - Interim Editor-in-chief during July 1909 to May 1911 period.
- J. W. Meriläinen - Interim Editor-in-chief during July 1909 to May 1911 period.
- Yrjö A. Mäkelä (1886–1957) - Interim Editor-in-chief 1918–1924, and Editor-in-chief August 1931 to March 1952.
- Elis Sulkanen (1887–1963) - Editor-in-chief from March 1952 to early 1960s.
- Marita Cauthen - Editor-in-chief from 1984 to termination in April 2009.

== Other Raivaaja Publishing Company periodicals ==
- Raivaajan Työvainiolta (Pioneer's Workfields), annual, 1905–1911.
- Raivaajan Kalenteri (Pioneer's Calendar), annual book, 1911.
  - Tietokäsikirja Amerikan Suomalaiselle Työväelle (Handbook for Finnish-American Workers), annual book, 1912–1913.
  - Kalenteri Amerikan Suomalaiselle Työväelle (Calendar for Finnish-American Workers), annual book, 1914–1922.
- Raivaajan Juolu (Pioneer's Christmas), Christmas annual, 1951–1952.
- Säkeniä (Sparks), monthly literary-theoretical magazine, 1907–1921.
  - Nykyaika (Modern Age), monthly and semi-monthly magazine, 1921–1937.

== See also ==
- Työmies
- Toveri
- Finnish Socialist Federation
- Non-English press of the Socialist Party of America
