= Allan Paivio =

Canadian psychologist and writer (1925–2016)

Allan Urho Paivio
- Born: March 29, 1925; Thunder Bay, Ontario, Canada
- Died: June 19, 2016 (aged 91); London, Ontario, Canada
- Education: McGill University
- Scientific career
- Fields: Psychology
- Workplaces: University of Western Ontario
- Thesis: Child rearing antecedents of audience sensitivity (1959)
- Doctoral advisor: Wallace Lambert

Allan Urho Paivio (March 29, 1925 – June 19, 2016) was a professor of psychology at the University of Western Ontario and former bodybuilder. He earned his Ph.D. from McGill University in 1959 and taught at the University of Western Ontario from 1963 until his retirement.

== Early life and family ==
Paivio was born in Thunder Bay, Ontario as the son of Aku Päiviö and Ida Hänninen. His father was a Finnish Canadian journalist, poet and socialist. Paivio's brother Jules Päiviö was an architect and professor. He was the last surviving member of the Mackenzie–Papineau Battalion fighting in the Spanish Civil War.

== Bodybuilding ==
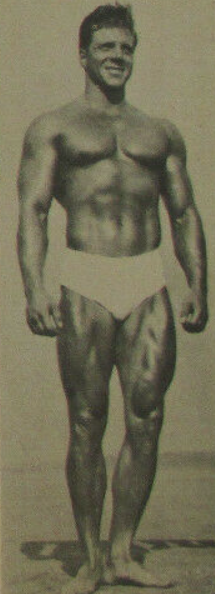
Paivio in a 1948 bodybuilding magazine

Paivio was a successful bodybuilder. In 1948, Allan Paivio won the title of "Mr. Canada" in a competition established by the International Federation of BodyBuilders.

In a 1948 article in the YOUR PHYSIQUE magazine, Pavio is described as a well known athlete, bodybuilder, gymnast and physical culturist. A photograph of Paivio from 1948's Mr. Canada was reprinted in the book Universal Hunks, 2013.

Paivio obtained a BSc in Physical Education from McGill University in 1949. He established a gym and health studios in Montreal.

== Academic career ==
Paivio has published approximately two hundred articles and is most known for his dual-coding theory. Dual-coding theory posits that nonverbal and verbal information are stored separately in long term memory. Dual coding theory is complemented by the theory of Alan Baddeley, in which working memory is divided into a visuospatial sketchpad and a phonological loop.

Paivio's work has implications in many areas including human factors, interface design, as well as the development of educational materials.

Allan Paivio earned three degrees from McGill University between 1949 and 1959. Paivio obtained a Ph.D. in Psychology, and spent over forty years in research on imagery, memory, language, cognition, and other areas. He published approximately two hundred articles and book chapters, and five books. His 1990 book Mental Representations described how imagery became controversial in the Protestant Reformation. His 2000 book, Imagery and Text: A Dual Coding Theory of Reading and Writing, he wrote with Mark Sadoski. He published his most recent book in 2006, Mind and Its Evolution: A Dual Coding Theoretical Approach.

== Dual coding theory ==
The dual coding theory (DCT), according to Paivio, suggests that visual and verbal information act as two distinctive systems. It has had its roots in the practical use of imagery as a memory aid 2500 years ago. For example, one can think of a car by thinking of the word "car", or by forming a mental image of a car. The verbal and image systems are correlated, as one can think of the mental image of the car and then describe it in words, or read or listen to words and then form a mental image. DCT identifies three types of processing: (1) representational, the direct activation of verbal or non-verbal representations, (2) referential, the activation of the verbal system by the nonverbal system or vice versa, and (3) associative processing, the activation of representations within the same verbal or nonverbal system. A given task may require any or all of the three kinds of processing. Verbal system units are called logogens; these units contain information that underlies our use of the word. Non-Verbal system units are called imagens. Imagens contain information that generates mental images such as natural objects, holistic parts of objects, and natural grouping of objects. Imagens operate synchronously or in parallel; thus all parts of an image are available at once. Logogens operate sequentially; words come one at a time in a syntactically appropriate sequence in a sentence. The two codes may overlap in the processing of information but greater emphasis is on one or the other. The verbal and non-verbal systems are further divided into subsystems that process information from different modalities. Many experiments reported by Paivio and others support the importance of imagery in cognitive operations. In one experiment, participants saw pairs of items that differed in roundness (e.g., tomato, goblet) and were asked to indicate which member of the pair was rounder. The objects were presented as words, pictures, or word-picture pairs. The response times were slowest for word-word pairs, intermediate for the picture-word pairs, and fastest for the picture-picture pairs.

== Empirical evidence ==
DCT research focused initially on memory and soon expanded to other cognitive phenomena. Memory remains crucial, however, because it is the basis of all knowledge and thought. The memory emphasis is further justified here because learning and memory are at the heart of educational goals. The effects can be explained by two DCT hypotheses. One hypothesis is that nonverbal and verbal codes, being functionally independent, can have additive effects on recall. For example, participants in free recall experiments are likely to name presented objects covertly and thus create a nonverbal (pictorial) and a verbal memory trace. They can also set up a dual verbal-nonverbal memory trace by imaging to concrete words, but this is somewhat less likely than naming pictures, hence the lower memory for concrete words than pictures. Abstract words are difficult to image and hence are least likely to be dually coded. The expected additive memory benefit of dual coding has been confirmed in numerous experiments which also suggested that the nonverbal code is mnemonically stronger (contributes more to the additive effect) than the verbal code.

== Recognition ==
- President, Canadian Psychological Association (1975)

== Publications ==
- Anderson, J. R. (2005). Cognitive Psychology and its implications. New York: Worth Publishers.
- Mayer, R. E. & Moreno, R. (2003). Nine ways to reduce cognitive load in multimedia learning. Educational Psychologist, 38(1), 43-52.
- Moreno, R., & Mayer, R. E. (2000). A coherence effect in multimedia learning: the case for minimizing irrelevant sounds in the design of multimedia instructional messages. Journal of Educational Psychology, 92, 117-125.
- Paivio, A (1971). Imagery and verbal processes. New York: Holt, Rinehart, and Winston.
- Paivio, A (1986). Mental representations: a dual coding approach. Oxford. England: Oxford University Press.
- https://web.archive.org/web/20110221091503/http://www.lifecircles-inc.com/Learningtheories/IP/paivio.html
- Paivio, A. (1986). Mental representations: A dual coding approach. New York: Oxford University Press
- Clark, J.M., & Paivio, A. (1991). Dual coding theory and education. Educational Psychology Review, 3, 149-210.
