= Finnish Socialist Federation =

The Finnish Socialist Federation (Finnish: Amerikan Suomalainen Sosialistijärjestö) was a language federation of the Socialist Party of America which united Finnish language-speaking immigrants in the United States in a national organization designed to conduct propaganda and education for socialism among their community.

In 1936, in response to a factional split in the Socialist Party which saw the party's moderate wing quit en masse to form the Social Democratic Federation of America, the Finnish Socialist Federation similarly departed to reestablish itself as the Finnish American League for Democracy (Finnish: Amerikan Suomalainen Kansanvallan Liitto).

== History ==
=== Early Finnish socialist newspapers in America ===
Finnish immigration to the United States was linked to two factors: growing repression of Finnish national autonomy in Tsarist Russia and the need for immigrant labor for the rapidly expanding economy of the United States. Immigrant recruiters were dispatched to Europe to entice people to come to America, where available land was comparatively bountiful and the promises for employment rose. Recruiters were especially active in the Central and Northern European countries. The peak year for Finnish immigration to America was 1902, when 23,152 Finns came to America. The total number of Finns in America by 1920 was estimated at 400,000 — a figure which included the American-born children of immigrants. A primary reason for this immigration spike was the Russian Conscription Law of 1901, which provided for the drafting of Finns into the Tsarist army, to which there was massive popular resistance.

In the 1890s, Finnish immigrants in Boston and New York formed the first workingmen's benevolent associations, the Saima Aid Society and the Imatra Society, dedicated to educational and fraternal needs. Explicitly socialist propaganda among the Finns dates back to 1899, when a number of independent local organizations emerged, primarily in the Eastern and Midwestern states. Only a fraction of these Finnish clubs were in any way connected with the organized socialist political movement. There was some limited effort made to join with the English-speaking movement, however, with a Finnish branch from Rockford, Massachusetts joining the Social Democratic Party of America on August 24, 1899.

Early 1900, an expelled socialist student from Helsinki, Antero F. Tanner, who was a founding member of the Rockford branch began to issue a Finnish-language newspaper which declared its intention to speak for the poor and exploited. A total of 24 weekly issues were published before Tanner's newspaper was forced to cease publication due to lack of funds. Tanner thereafter went on a national organizing tour in 1901, as did his colleague, Martin Hendrickson. One of the places that Hendrickson pioneered was in the Finnish communities of Minnesota, where the first socialist club, "Jousi" ("Crossbow"), was established in Hancock, Michigan.

In 1903, a satirical, pro-socialist journal called Uusi Meikäläinen ("New Fellow-Countryman") was published in Fitchburg, Massachusetts, by a recent arrival, Urho A. Makinen. Makinen joined with another new Finnish émigré, Antti Tarmo, and others and purchased a small press in Worcester where the American Finnish Workers Publishing Co. was formed. On July 8, 1903, the board of this company began the publication of a workingclass newspaper in the Finnish language, Amerikan Suomalainen Työmies ("American Finnish Worker"). This would emerge as Työmies, the leading Finnish-language newspaper in America. The publication began to appear on July 20, 1903, as a four-page weekly. The first editor of the publication was Vihtori Kosonen who editorialized in the first issue of the publication the fundamental role the paper would play in support of "human dignity and justice for the oppressed peoples." In May 1904, the board decided to move the newspaper to the largest Finnish community in the midwest — Hancock, Michigan. Työmies' first Michigan-produced issue appeared on August 16, 1904, and included the election platform of Socialist Party Presidential candidate Eugene V. Debs.

=== Formation of Independent Branches of the Socialist Party of America ===
Organization of Finns into the Socialist Party of America began on a larger scale in 1902 and 1903. Dozens of Finnish language SPA locals and branches were organized during this period. The Finnish movement remained scattered and weak in these earliest years, however, only gradually coming together as a formal national organization in its own right.

Delegates to the 1904 Convention of the independent branches of the SPA.

A Convention of independent Finnish groups was held October 3–5, 1904 in Cleveland, Ohio to discuss ways in which the various Finnish branches could better work together. The gathering was attended by 14 delegates, some of whom represented multiple branches. No formal organization resulted from this gathering however, and the approximately 40 branches spread around the United States retained their organizational independence from one another. This body elected a committee of three was elected to confer with the Socialist Party to determine the conditions under which the Finnish Workers Groups might affiliate with the Socialist Party. According to a report from the Socialist Party's fraternal delegate to the gathering, "The consensus of opinion, as I understand, was to have their organizations reorganized as a body, they to adopt our platform and constitution and their locals to fraternize with our locals. They did not care to become identified with our city 'Chicago' or this organization directly."

=== The Organization of Finnish Socialists (Yhdysvaltain Suomalainen Sosialistijärjestö) ===
In August 1906 another convention of Finnish groups was held, this time at Hibbing, Minnesota. Thirty branches were represented. It was here that plans were laid for a permanent organization, the Organization of Finnish Socialists (Yhdysvaltain Suomalainen Sosialistijärjestö), and a Secretary elected to coordinate the various local organizations and to prepare for the affiliation of this new organization to the Socialist Party of America. The Organization of Finnish Socialists was governed by a 5-member "Executive Board," elected by general referendum vote of the membership. In addition, paralleling the structure of the SPA of the day there was a "General Committee" in which each state was represented according to the number of locals. The group also made use of the referendum vote to solve contentious issues, again closely following the practice of the SPA.

One important innovation created by the 1906 Hibbing Convention was the establishment of the National Finnish Translator's office. Difficulties with rendering English into Finnish for the various local branches and the press caused Finnish groups in Minnesota, Michigan, and Wisconsin to hire a regular translator. This experiment proved to be a success and the Hibbing Convention established the position of National Translator, for the benefit of all member branches. Discussion was immediately held with the Socialist Party to have their National Translator work out of the national headquarters of the SPA in Chicago, a move which took effect with its formal affiliation of the Finnish Socialist Organization with the SPA on January 1, 1907. The Federation initially paid for all office fixtures and rent for the Translator's office, as well as the Translator's salary. Effective in May 1908, the Socialist Party began providing free office space to the Finnish Federation. The salary of the Translator-Secretary also began to be covered by the SPA effective October 1910. Victor Watia served as the first National Translator of the Organization of Finnish Socialists.

The Hibbing Convention divided the group into three regional districts (alueet) for propaganda and organizational purposes — Eastern, Middle, and Western — each governed by its own seven member District Committee. The three districts each employed a full-time District Organizer, periodically sent out additional special organizers, and published their own daily newspaper — Raivaaja ("The Pioneer") in the Eastern District (circulation over 6,000 in 1912), Työmies ("The Worker") in the Middle District (circulation about 12,000 in 1912), and Toveri ("The Comrade") in the Western District (circulation around 4,000 in 1912). This regional separatism of the Finnish organization's apparatus and press lead over time to ideological differences, with the Eastern District tending towards a more reformist orientation, while the Western and particularly the Central Districts tended towards a more revolutionary perspective.

Funding of the Finnish Translator's Office was accomplished by the sale of special 5 cent monthly stamps to members of Finnish branches, as well as by dues rebates allowed by some (but not all) SPA state organizations. States allowing rebates in 1908 included Colorado, Idaho, Indiana, Michigan, Minnesota, Montana, Ohio, Pennsylvania, Washington, West Virginia, and Wyoming.

In addition to the three newspapers previously mentioned, the Finnish socialist movement of the 1910s issued a monthly theoretical-literary magazine called Säkeniä, published in Fitchburg, Massachusetts; a comic bi-weekly called Lapatossu (Hancock, Michigan); a women's paper called Toveritar (Astoria, Oregon), and provided a major source of funding and subscriptions for a paper published in Port Arthur, Ontario, Canada, called Työkansa.

The Finnish Federation was well known for its network of Federation-owned halls located in the major centers of the Finnish-American community. These halls provided facilities for meetings, speeches, and social events such as dances.

The federation made its affairs known through a monthly bulletin launched in March 1911 via the Translator-Secretary's office in Chicago. The bulletin, which contained official reports and announcements as well as a summary of membership conditions and activity of Finnish Federation branches, was distributed free in bundles to the various members of the Finnish Federation.

In June 1912 a third convention of the Finnish Socialist Federation was held, with 58 delegates from across the country in attendance. The group met in the building of the federation's school, Työväen Opisto, or Work People's College in Smithville, Minnesota. The convention discussed the relationship of Work People's College to the national organization, criticized the national officers of the organization and made plans for their future work, and criticized the content of the three national Finnish socialist newspapers, expressing a desire to bring these under closer control of the national organization. A proposal at the 3rd Convention to do away with the 3 District System was defeated, although it was resolved (in theory, at least) that the Federation should endeavor in the future to take direct ownership of the three stock companies publishing the district newspapers in a "Socialist Trust." The practical details of this transition was left to the future.

=== The faction fight of 1914-15 ===
In 1914 and 1915, factional differences within the Finnish Socialist Federation erupted and led to a split of the federation. This controversy was a reprise of a similar fight which had swept the Socialist Party of America in 1912 and 1913, over the issues of syndicalism and sabotage and the party's relationship to the radical industrial union, the Industrial Workers of the World.

The constructive socialist Eastern District, centered around the newspaper Raivaaja, named a slate of candidates for the Executive Committee of the Federation in the 1914 referendum election. Apparently supported by a moderate group then heading the newspaper Työmies, the Raivaaja group was elected in its entirety. The newly elected Executive Committee attempted to exert control of the organization, publication, and assets of the predominantly revolutionary socialist Central District. The leading figure of the constructive socialist (Right) faction was National Committeeman Frank Aaltonen of Minnesota. Leaders of the revolutionary socialist (Left) faction included Workers' College instructors Leo Laukki, A. Rissanen, and Yrjö Sirola — the last of whom went on to play an influential role in the Finnish Revolution of 1918.

The 1914 convention of the Middle District, held in Duluth, Minnesota from February 21 to 28, 1914, was the scene of a showdown between the constructive socialist and revolutionary socialist wings of the Finnish Federation. The gathering was attended by 49 regularly elected delegates, elected by election districts. In addition, the Central District Committee, Työmies, and the Work People's College each were granted one delegate with voice but no vote to the convention.

An action was taken by the new Executive Committee on June 17, 1914, calling for sanctions against any local or individual supporting the new left-wing Finnish-language newspaper, Sosialisti, published in Duluth. Some 40 branches were expelled and another 30 withdrew amidst allegations that they advocated syndicalism and direct action, in contradiction to the constitution of the SPA. Most of these branches were located in Minnesota and Michigan, with only a few located in the Western States. The National Executive Committee of the Socialist Party of America was called into the Finnish Federation dispute, siding with the Right faction and prohibiting expelled Left Wing members from forming their own Finnish language Socialist Party locals outside of the control of the Finnish Federation itself.

A 4th Convention was called in November 1914 to resolve the factional warfare that was erupting within the Finnish Federation. The fight at this convention pitted a constructive socialist Eastern "majority" faction against a midwestern "radical" faction, grouped around the Duluth, Minnesota newspaper Sosialisti and led by Leo Laukki, a former managing editor of Työmies. The majority faction seems to have easily controlled the gathering.

A special subcommittee of the Socialist Party's NEC consisting of Executive Secretary Walter Lanfersiek, Oscar Ameringer, and James Maurer attended the November convention of the Finnish Federation and held another session at which seven representatives of each faction made their case verbally and with documents. The subcommittee reported to the December 12–13, 1914 session of the NEC and recommended that the constructive socialist leadership of the Finnish Federation be backed unconditionally. According to the unanimously-passed resolution of the NEC, "the decision of the Finnish Federation as to expulsion of locals or members shall be accepted by state, county, and local organizations as final." This decision assured a continued factional war with mass expulsions and resignations from the federation. The 4,000 or so Left Wing defectors from the Finnish federation retained control of the Federation's Work People's College, located in Smithville, MN, and in 1915 began publishing a new newspaper of their own called Industrialisti. By 1920 this new publication claimed a readership of over 20,000.

Despite the NEC's earlier action, the factional war continued to rage among the Finnish Federation of Minnesota. The Left Wing state party organization refused to issue charters to new locals organized by the (Regular) Finnish Federation in the state. On this the NEC declined to act at its September 1915 meeting in Chicago, drafting instead a letter which noted that "Under the present national constitution of the Socialist Party, the Executive Committee has no jurisdiction in matters of this kind, and is therefore powerless to act. We are convinced any action we take as a committee instead of helping the situation may but lead to further friction and bitterness." An appeal was made to the Minnesota State Committee to "take up these differences in a spirit of comradeship."

=== The Finnish Socialist Federation after the Revolution of 1918 ===
In Finland, the reaction crushed the revolution of 1918 and exacted a bloody vengeance, known as the "White Terror". According to Finnish historian Jaakko Paavolainen, during and shortly after the Civil War, White Finns executed 8,380 people for purported "war crimes" or other reasons. The great majority of these came from the Finnish provinces of Uusimaa, Turku-and-Pori, Häme, and Viipuri. Other historians have numbered the actual executions far lower while acknowledging an even higher death toll for Red Finns in White captivity. Historian Jay Smith noted in a 1958 monograph that of 73,915 prisoners in the hands of the White Finnish Government on July 5, 1918, "no less than 11,783 were dead by the beginning of November." Executions made up a tiny fraction of this total, according to Smith, with the deaths of the great mass "the result of malnutrition, aggravated by the filthy conditions of the prison camps." Smith indicated that there was no evidence of a deliberate attempt by White authorities to engage in systematic homicide by starvation and disease. Regardless of the actual cause of the catastrophe, the thousands of dead in the aftermath of the failed 1918 revolt created an enormous barrier in the Finnish community between supporters and opponents of the socialist revolution and marked a major turning point in the history of the Finnish socialist movement in America. All factions of the Socialist Party of America were supportive of the overthrown revolutionary government in Finland, it should be noted, although the events there served to energize adherents of revolutionary methods.

In July 1919, the Finnish Socialist Federation, headed by Translator-Secretary Henry Askeli, issued a proclamation calling for affiliation of the SPA to the Communist International and demanding "the renewal of the program of the American Socialist Party," calling on it to "reject the viewpoint of petty bourgeois socialism" and demanding that it adopt "Marxian revolutionary socialism." Despite this endorsement, the fact that the Finnish Federation did not formally endorse the Left Wing Manifesto written by Louis C. Fraina or lend official support to the Left Wing Section of the Socialist Party, an organized faction engaged in trying to "win the Socialist Party for revolutionary socialism," no suspensions or expulsions were levied by the embattled outgoing National Executive Committee of the Socialist Party against the Finnish Federation.

On August 30, 1919, the Emergency National Convention of the SPA opened in Chicago. Of 124 official delegates present, 6 were from the Finnish Socialist Federation. These included both representatives of the Left like Henry Askeli and George Halonen and those aligned with the Center-Right bloc, including Yrjö Mäkelä, Victor Annala, Wilho Hedman, and Lauri Moilanen. There were no members of the Finnish Federation elected to the National Executive Committee of the SPA; Matti Tenhunen of Superior, WI was nominated, but did not receive sufficient votes. The convention was generally hostile to immigrant party members and a decision was made that applicants for party membership had to promise to apply for US citizenship within three months. This attitude alienated the Finnish Federation, driving that group increasingly into opposition to the SPA's ruling faction in Chicago. Still, in the aftermath of the split, the Finnish Federation saw the Socialist Party as the least bad option. Writing in Työmies in September 1919, Finnish Socialist Federation Translator-Secretary Henry Askeli characterized the CPA as composed mostly of foreigners who were opponents of political action and who favored a program impossible to carry out in the United States. The Communist Labor Party was no better, according to Askeli — an amalgam of adventurers, writers, soap box orators, and embittered Socialist regulars out only for revenge. The Socialist Party, even if controlled by the Center-Right, was the preferred option, in Askeli's view: "With work and by raising the level of consciousness among the membership, we can make it into a party capable of fulfilling the requirements of a political party for today's revolutionary workers."

On October 25, 1919, some 42 delegates of the Finnish Socialist Federation to the group's 5th Convention gathered at Imperial Hall, located on North Halsted Street in Chicago. A split of the organization loomed. As a news account in the New York Call put matters:

It is certain that the convention will see a breach in the ranks, as several Finnish Socialist locals have already decided to demand that the party affiliate with the so-called Third International. A few Finnish Socialist locals already have demanded that the Finnish Federation should join the Communist Party, but this is not likely to happen, although it is possible that some of the Finnish locals will secede from the party and go to the Communists.

=== The faction fight of 1920-21 ===
The Federation was deeply divided, with the Eastern district and its organ Raivaaja standing steadfastly for the Socialist Party, the Middle District and its organ Työmies highly critical of the Socialist Party (although still not advocating abandoning the organization), and the Western District and its organ Toveri attempting to steer a middle course. The convention temporarily suspended the three district organizations, an action that was ostensibly intended as a means of preserving organizational unity by quashing "district spirit." Final approval of this decision had to be made by membership referendum, which was passed at the beginning of January 1920. This change was actually a victory for the Left Wing within the Finnish Federation, as it placed the pro-SPA Eastern paper Raivaaja under closer scrutiny of the central leadership of the Federation, which was of distinctly leftist sentiments. After several days of heated debate, a resolution on Raivaaja was passed which criticized that paper for not altering its position to the left after the Aug. 1919 removal of Editor-in-Chief Frans Josef Syrjälä by referendum vote of the Federation. The paper was accused of opportunistic views and "wrong" attitudes against the ousted majority of the Socialist Party. The position of Työmies was endorsed.

The Federation was divided between two main positions: staying within the Socialist Party of America or severing ties and existing as an independent organization. The 5th convention appointed a "Conciliatory Committee" composed of representatives of these two main views. The Eastern members of this group did not want to secede from the Socialist Party, instead advocating that Finnish branches remain affiliated and carry out their affairs in a manner acceptable to the party. The representatives of the Central and Western Districts also emphasized the need to preserve unity of the Finnish Federation, arguing that the best means to achieve this would be to have the federation remain independent of any political party, while permitting individual members of the Federation to join the SP, the CPA, the CLP, or to stay independent of them all. The latter position ultimately won the day by a vote of 21 to 20, with all 19 Eastern delegates voting to remain in the SPA and all 19 delegates from the Middle and Western districts voting for independence. The deciding votes were cast by the representatives of the three Finnish papers, with F. J. Syrjälä of Raivaaja voting with the Eastern group and the representatives of Työmies and Toveri voting with the majority. The decision was referred to a vote of the membership of the Federation; a split seemed imminent.

In January 1920, a referendum was taken of the Finnish Federation's members. Powered by a united East, the final vote showed 3,775 to 2,259 in favor of remaining within the Socialist Party. The 6,070 votes indicated that 56% of the Federation had participated in the vote; of 3,800 votes cast in the Eastern District, some 3,212 (82%) favored continued affiliation with the SPA. Voting in the Eastern District was very heavy (67% voting), in the Middle District rather lighter (47% ), with voters in the Western District seemingly apathetic (just 29% voting).

On March 4, 1920, the Executive Committee of the Finnish Federation directly queried Executive Secretary Otto Branstetter and the National Executive Committee of the Socialist Party about its plans with regard to the Comintern. The NEC formally responded to this document with a statement in November, indicating that membership in the Communist International had become impossible.

The Finnish Federation held its 6th National Convention in Waukegan, Illinois late in December 1920. Throughout the year the United Communist Party had been conducting a campaign among the Finns to attempt to separate the organization from the Socialist Party. This initiative met with success, with UCP Executive Secretary Wagenknecht noting in a May 1921 report to the Comintern that a majority of the delegates to the 6th Convention of the Finnish Federation were already members of the UCP. According to Wagenknecht, the UCP had 79 Finnish language groups, "and new groups are being formed constantly."

The 21 delegates to the 6th Convention voted by a tally of 16-5 to withdraw the Finnish Federation from membership in the Socialist Party, due in large measure to the failure of that organization to affiliate with the Third International. Even the representative of the Massachusetts paper Raivaaja voted for the independent organization, as did the delegates from New York state, contrary to the pre-convention instructions from their constituents. Finnish Left Wing leader Elis Sulkanen sought to have the Finnish Federation depart from the Socialist Party on the one hand, but not to join with the United Communist Party on the other. Työmies backed Sulkanen in this view — both were willing to leave the question of joining the Comintern through membership in one of its constituent parties to the future.

As historian Auvo Kostiainen notes, the 1920 Waukegan convention

was the unofficial start of the Finnish-American communist movement. The sympathy of the Finnish-American radical 'independents' was on the communists' side, and a number of them were already members of the illegal communist movement. Now, they were waiting for the establishment of a legal communist party. During the following summer, the first open contacts were made with American communists and finally, at the end of the same year [1921], Finnish-Americans were an important element in the formation of an open communist party, the Workers Party of America.

=== From independence to the Workers Party of America ===
The main section of the Finnish Federation chose to remain independent of any political party for a time, neither returning to the Socialist Party nor engaging in the narrow "underground" politics of the factionally shattered Communist Parties. The Secretary of the Finish Federation during this interval remained Henry Askeli, who maintained the organization's central office at 3323 N Clark Street, Chicago. The Executive Committee in 1921 included: K.F. Tuhkanen (Bloomington, IL); Imer Belle (Chicago); Fahle Burman (Waukegan, IL); Frank Laurila (Waukegan); Vaino Lehto (Waukegan); John Huttunan (Waukegan), and Caro Hyrake (travelling organizer). The underground Communist Party of America included only about 400 dues-paying Finnish-American members in 1921.

The situation changed dramatically at the end of 1921, with the formation of the Workers Party of America (WPA). The Finnish Federation was one of the largest constituent organizations at the formation of this new group, and after its establishment the Finns remained far and away the largest national group in the organization. In 1923 over 40% of the WPA's 16,000 or so paid members hailed from the Finnish Federation.

The Finnish Workers Federation had eight regional districts — 1. New England; 2. New York and the seaboard; 3. Ohio, including Western PA, Western NY, and Detroit; 4. Chicago, including Waukegan and Illinois communities; 5. Upper Michigan; 6. Minnesota, including northern Wisconsin and the Dakotas; 7. Oregon and Washington; and 8. California. At times there were formal sub-districts in the mountain states and elsewhere that functioned under one of the regular districts.

Clubs in the various districts met annually in convention that reviewed the previous year's work, planned for the distribution and support of the Finnish-language press, planned for literature publication and distribution. Larger districts had full-time district secretaries and newspaper agents, who toured virtually house-to-house soliciting newspaper subscriptions and selling literature.

The Finnish Workers Federation merged with the International Workers Order in 1941.

=== Membership of the Finnish Socialist Federation ===
The Finnish Socialist Federation in the United States showed the following levels of average paid membership:

Year	Branches	Ave. Members
1906	53	2,000
1907	133	2,928
1908	150	3,960
1909	160	5,284
1910	173	7,767
1911	217	9,139
1912	248	11,535
1913	260	12,651
1914	227	11,657
1915	212	8,859
1916	224	9,396
1917	219	9,468
1918	236	10,668
1919	225	10,884
1920-I	200	9,442
1920-II	159	6,136
1921		6,390

=== Reorganized Finnish Federation (Yhdysvaltain Sosialistipuolueen Suomalainen Järjestö) ===
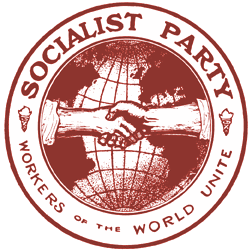
The Yhdysvaltain Sosialistipuolueen Suomalainen Järjestö (U.S. Finnish Socialist Organization) was the reorganized Finnish-language Federation of the Socialist Party of America.

In the aftermath of the 1920 Waukegan convention, 30 clubs with a membership of around 2,000, primarily in the Eastern region, withdrew from the federation in order to remain affiliated with the Socialist Party of America. This group of locals reorganized themselves as the Finnish socialist Federation in 1921, with a reorganization committee elected in January 1921 in accord with a suggestion of the National Office of the SPA.

At the end of February 1921 came the annual meeting of the Raivaaja Publishing Co., holding company for the Fitchburg, Massachusetts newspaper of that name. Just about all shareholders were represented by proxies at this meeting — and some proxies were claimed by competing factions, each of which sent its own delegation to the meeting. "The tension between the two competing groups became so intense that even fist fights occurred, and police were called to keep order." Both sides had lawyers present. Supporters of the SPA gained the majority in the committee examining proxies and rejected delegates representing 3,000 shares, thus gaining control of the meeting for the faction loyal to the SPA. Raivaaja thus became the organ of the reorganized Finnish Socialist Federation (Yhdysvaltain Sosialistipuolueen Suomalainen Järjestö) and severed its connection with the official Finnish Federation, which had founded the paper and ostensibly was its issuing authority. As a result, a new Left Wing Finnish language newspaper was established to take the place of the lost publication — Eteenpäin, the first issue of which appeared on May 25, 1921 in New York City. After about a year, publication moved to Worcester, Massachusetts due to financial difficulties.

The reorganized Finnish Socialist Federation held its first national convention at Fitchburg, Massachusetts from Aug. 13 to 15, 1921. The gathering was attended by 12 delegates, elected by membership referendum. At the time of the convention, the reorganized federation claimed 66 locals in 14 states — 20 of these in Massachusetts, 4 in Vermont, 7 in New Hampshire, 4 in Connecticut, 5 in New York, 1 in Rhode Island, 4 in New Jersey, 7 in Ohio, and the balance spread out in a number of other states. The federation claimed a membership of 3300.

The reorganized Federation again made use of a division into 3 regions—one comprising the New England states, one New York, New Jersey, Delaware, and part of Connecticut and Pennsylvania, and the third the remaining portion of Pennsylvania, Ohio, and the middle western states. Nine locals of the Finnish Federation organized youth groups, called Young People's Socialist Societies, chartered by the National Office of the Socialist Party and including 217 members at the time of the Fitchburg convention. Seventeen locals also conducted Socialist Sunday Schools, which included 946 children. The Federation included a strong social (as opposed to political) component: 10 of the 66 locals of the reorganized Federation had brass bands at the time of the convention, 9 had singing societies, 18 had dramatic societies, and 13 had athletic clubs.

In addition to the daily Raivaaja, the reorganized Finnish Socialist Federation published a semi-monthly scientific and literary journal called Nykyaika. The reorganized Federation published 3 pamphlets up to the time of the August Fitchburg Convention — one detailing the split in the federation, a second urging workers to support the Socialist Party, and a third containing the report of the Federation's fraternal delegate to the 1921 Detroit Convention of the Socialist Party, along with key resolutions of that gathering.

The reorganized Finnish Federation was headed by a National Executive Committee elected from the various locals in the Chicago area up to the August Fitchburg Convention. Due to the concentration of the reorganized Federation in the New England and Eastern US, however, that conclave determined to move federation headquarters from party headquarters in Chicago to Fitchburg—ostensibly on a temporary basis. The local members of the National Executive Committee, previously hailing from the Chicago area, were henceforth elected from Locals Gardner, Fitchburg, Worcester, and Maynard, Massachusetts. The NEC of the Federation was to be elected each December by general vote of the membership, and was to hold office for one calendar year. This NEC was to directly appoint the Secretary of the Federation. Conventions of the reorganized Finnish Federation were to be held bi-annually.

The Fitchburg Convention reaffirmed the old model of federation relationship to the Socialist Party—dues stamps were purchased by the Finnish Federation itself from the National Office in Chicago and were sold to the locals for 40 cents each; the locals then sold the dues stamps to the members for 50 cents each, keeping the difference to fund their own operations.

The Socialist Party maintained a strong affiliated Finnish Language Federation throughout the 1920s and beyond. In 1927 this group counted an average monthly paid membership of 2,030—a figure which fell to 1,842 for the same months of 1928. Regardless, the Finnish Federation was the largest of the SP's five language federations in this period, contributing over 18% of the party membership in 1927 and over 16% in 1928.

== Finnish American League for Democracy ==
In 1936, in response to a split of the Socialist Party which saw more conservative elements leave to establish the Social Democratic Federation, the Finnish Socialist Federation similarly departed the organization to remake itself as the "Finnish American League for Democracy."

On January 8, 1987, the final issue of Raivaaja as "the organ of the Finnish American League for Democracy" was published.

== See also ==
- Language federation
- Work People's College
- Finnish-language press of the Communist Party USA
- Finnish-language press of the Socialist Party of America
- Socialist Party of Oregon
