= Dual-coding theory =

Theory of cognition

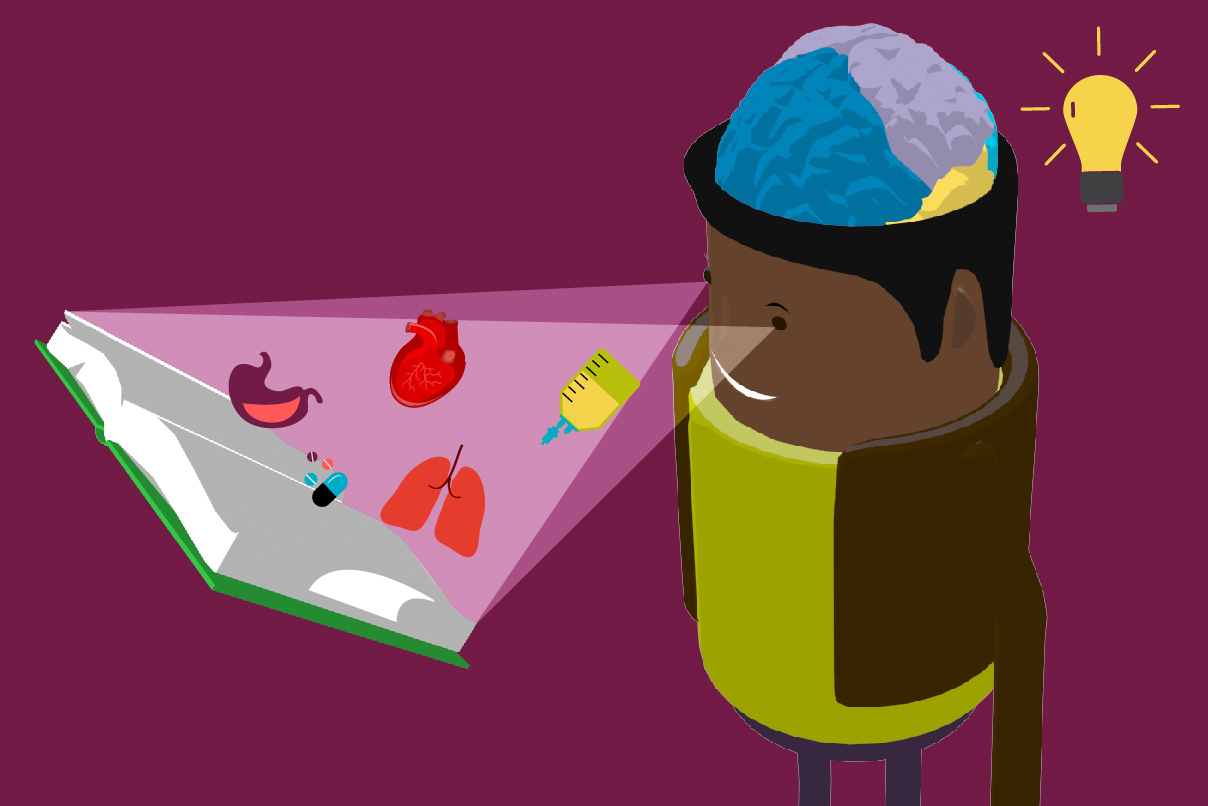
Visual Storytelling by Suhani Gowan.

Dual coding theory is a theory of cognition that suggests that the mind processes information along two different channels; verbal and nonverbal. It was first hypothesized by Allan Paivio of the University of Western Ontario in the late 1960s. In developing this theory, Paivio used the idea that the formation of mental imagery aids learning through the picture superiority effect.

According to Paivio, there are two ways a person could expand on learned material: verbal associations and imagery. Dual coding theory postulates that both sensory imagery and verbal information is used to represent information. Imagery and verbal information are processed differently and along distinct channels in the human mind, creating separate representations for information processed in each channel. The mental codes corresponding to these representations are used to organize incoming information that can be acted upon, stored, and retrieved for subsequent use. Both imagery and verbal codes can be used when recalling information. For example, say a person has stored the stimulus concept "dog" as both the word 'dog' and as the image (appearance, sound, smell, and other sensory information) of a dog. When asked to recall the stimulus, the person can retrieve either the word or the image individually, or both simultaneously. If the word is recalled, the image of the dog is not lost and can still be retrieved at a later point in time. The ability to code a stimulus two different ways increases the chance of remembering that item compared to if the stimulus was only coded one way.

There has been controversy to the limitations of the dual coding theory. Dual coding theory does not take into account the possibility of cognition being mediated by something other than words and images. Not enough research has been done to determine if words and images are the only way we remember items, and the theory would not hold true if another form of codes were discovered. Another limitation of the dual coding theory is that it is only valid for tests on which people are asked to focus on identifying how concepts are related. If associations between a word and an image cannot be formed, it is much harder to remember and recall the word at a later point in time. While this limits the effectiveness of the dual coding theory, it is still valid over a wide range of circumstances and can be used to improve memory.

== Types of codes ==
Analogue codes are used to mentally represent images. Analogue codes retain the main perceptual features of whatever is being represented, so the images we form in our minds are highly similar to the physical stimuli. They are a near-exact representation of the physical stimuli we observe in our environment, such as trees and rivers.

Symbolic codes are used to form mental representations of words. They represent something conceptually, and sometimes, arbitrarily, as opposed to perceptually. Similar to the way a watch may represent information in the form of numbers to display the time, symbolic codes represent information in our mind in the form of arbitrary symbols, like words and combinations of words, to represent several ideas. Each symbol (x, y, 1, 2, etc.) can arbitrarily represent something other than itself. For instance, the letter x is often used to represent more than just the concept of an x, the 24th letter of the alphabet. It can be used to represent a variable x in mathematics, or a multiplication symbol in an equation. Concepts like multiplication can be represented symbolically by an "x" because we arbitrarily assign it a deeper concept. Only when we use it to represent this deeper concept does the letter "x" carry this type of meaning.

== Support ==
=== Evidence from psychological research ===
Many researchers have agreed that only words and images are used in mental representation. Supporting evidence shows that memory for some verbal information is enhanced if a relevant visual is also presented or if the learner can imagine a visual image to go with the verbal information. Likewise, visual information can often be enhanced when paired with relevant verbal information, whether real-world or imagined. This theory has been applied to the use of multimedia presentations. Because multimedia presentations require both spatial and verbal working memory, individuals dual code information presented and are more likely to recall the information when tested at a later date. Moreover, studies that have been conducted on abstract and concrete words have also found that the participants remembered concrete words better than the abstract words.

Paivio found that participants when shown a rapid sequence of pictures as well as a rapid sequence of words and later asked to recall the words and pictures, in any order, were better at recalling images. Participants, however, more readily recalled the sequential order of the words, rather than the sequence of pictures. These results supported Paivio's hypothesis that verbal information is processed differently from visual information and that verbal information was superior to visual information when sequential order was also required for the memory task. Lee Brooks conducted an experiment that provided additional support for two systems for memory. He had participants perform either a visual task, where they had to view a picture and answer questions about the picture, or a verbal task, where they listened to a sentence and were then asked to answer questions pertaining to the sentence. To respond to the questions, participants were asked to either respond verbally, visually, or manually. Through this experiment, Brooks found that interference occurred when a visual perception was mixed with manipulation of the visual task, and verbal responses interfere with a task involving a verbal statement to be manually manipulated. This supported the idea of two codes used to mentally represent information.

Working memory as proposed by Alan Baddeley includes a two-part processing system with a visuospatial sketchpad and a phonological loop which essentially maps to Paivio's theory.

Dual coding theories complement a dual-route theory of reading. When people read written information, dual-route theory contends that the readers access orthographic and phonological information to recognize words in the writing.

Paivio's work has implications for literacy, visual mnemonics, idea generation, HPT, human factors, interface design, as well as the development of educational materials among others. It also has implications for, and counterparts in, cognitive sciences and computational cognitive modeling (in the form of dual process cognitive models and so on). It also has had implications for cognitive robotics.

=== Cognitive neuroscience support ===
Two different methods have been used to identify the regions involved in visual perception and visual imagery. First, functional magnetic resonance imaging (fMRI) is used to measure cerebral blood flow, which allows researchers to identify the amount of glucose and oxygen being consumed by a specific part of the brain, with an increase in blood flow providing a measure of brain activity. Second, an event-related potential (ERP) can be used to show the amount of electrical brain activity that is occurring due to a particular stimulus. Researchers have used both methods to determine which areas of the brain are active with different stimuli, and results have supported the dual-coding theory. Other research has been done with positron emission tomography (PET) scans and fMRI to show that participants had improved memory for spoken words and sentences when paired with an image, imagined or real. Those participants also showed an increase in brain activation that processes abstract words not easily paired with an image.

== Alternative theory ==
Dual coding theory is not accepted by everyone. John Anderson and Gordon Bower proposed an alternative method – the propositional theory – of how knowledge is mentally represented. The propositional theory claims that mental representations are stored as propositions rather than as images. Here, proposition is defined as the meaning that underlies the relationship between concepts. The propositional theory is able to explain the basic concept of an idea without needing images or verbal information. It is able to take the complex and break it down more into the differing components of the idea or concept. This theory states that images occur as a result of other cognitive processes because knowledge is not represented in the form of images, words, or symbols. This theory is also related to A Natural Deduction Systems model. This type of model allows for both feed forward and its reverse.

The common coding theory has also been proposed as an alternative to dual coding theory. The common coding theory looks at how things we see and hear are connected to our motor actions. It claims that there is a common code that is shared between perceiving something and the respective motor action.

== See also ==
- Multimedia learning
