= Työmies =

Finnish language communist newspaper in the USA

Front page of the April 19, 1912, issue of Työmies, featuring coverage of the sinking of the R.M.S. Titanic

Työmies (The Worker) was a politically radical Finnish-language newspaper published primarily out of Hancock, Michigan, and Superior, Wisconsin. Launched as a weekly in July 1903, the paper later went to daily frequency and was issued under its own name until its merger with the communist newspaper Eteenpäin (Forward) in 1950 to form Työmies-Eteenpäin.

Työmies was affiliated with the Finnish Socialist Federation of the Socialist Party of America before later becoming a publication of the Communist Party, USA.

== History ==
=== Establishment ===
Työmies was established in Worcester, Massachusetts, in 1903 as Amerikan Suomalainen Työmies (The Finnish-American Worker). The original Amerikan Suomalainen Työmies began publication with the purpose of spreading socialism and held an inclusive stance towards religion despite historical conflict between the labor movement and Finnish Lutheranism. However, this flexible stance changed only a month later when Vihtori Kosonen became editor.

In June 1904 the publication was moved to the small town of Hancock, located in the Upper Peninsula of Michigan. The paper remained in that location for a decade before moving to the comparative metropolis of Superior, Wisconsin, a virtual twin city of Duluth, Minnesota. Työmies' first Michigan-produced issue appeared on August 16, 1904, and included the election platform of Socialist Party Presidential candidate Eugene V. Debs. Circulation of the paper grew to about 4,000 in that year.

From its earliest days, Työmies was a Marxist publication, considered significantly more radical than its East Coast counterpart established in January 1905, Raivaaja (The Pioneer). Both of these radical weeklies had broader organizational goals than merely bringing the news to a Finnish-American readership profitably, instead seeking to help construct a potent network of Finnish Americans to advance the cause of socialism through political and economic means.

Local Finnish socialist groups began to centralize around the same period that Työmies (and Raivaaja) were launched, holding a convention at Duluth in 1904 as the "Finnish-American Labor League." In 1906 the 73 affiliated Finnish locals were admitted to the Socialist Party of America (SPA) as the Finnish Socialist Federation, thereby adding between 2,000 and 3,000 members to the party's ranks. The Finnish-Americans thereby became the first of the SPA's language federations, which would come to dominate the party's membership rolls by the end of the 1910s. From the mid-1910s onward, the Finnish-American socialists focused on political action, labor organization, and the building of cooperatives to promote their cause.

=== Other publications ===
The Työmies Publishing Company briefly published an English-language paper called Wage Slave starting in 1908 which was intended as Michigan's Socialist Party mouthpiece, advocating for the Socialist Party of America. This paper signaled an attempt to reach non-Finns in the American working class struggle and served as a multi-ethnic promoter of the Copper Country's labor movement, Michigan's socialists, and the Socialist Party of America.

The Työmies Publishing Company also published a number of annual magazines in the Finnish language. These periodicals had a key theme of solidarity with fellow workers, though they also offered discussion of current events and the socialist leaning interpretation of the events. Some of these magazines included Köyhälistön Nuija, Luokkataistelijan Asevarasto, Punainen Juhannus, Työmiehen Joulu, Työväen Kalenteri, Soihtu, Uuden Ajan Soihtu, Vappu and Pelto ja Koti. Pelto ja Koti was a periodical of the cooperative movement specifically directed towards Finnish American farmers. It was considered the best-known and largest paper meant for Finnish-American farmers and the cooperative movement. The paper advertised for a meeting of co-operative store organizers which was eventually held in Superior in July 1916 and led to the creation of the Central Cooperative Exchange (CCE) on August 30, 1917. The Central Cooperative Exchange had a close connection to the labor movement and the Työmies newspaper supported cooperative ideas from its start in 1903, doing the bulk of the work to connect cooperatives and socialists. The CCE worked to spread the idea of the consumers’ cooperative movement among Finns across North America. Thus, the Työmies Publishing Company served as a platform for organizing collective action first during the 1914 strikes in the Copper country and later as part of the cooperative movement.

In addition to these magazines, the Työmies Publishing Company also published translations of American authors such as Clarence Darrow, James H. Brower, Robert Ingersol, Jack London, “Big” Bill Haywood, and Charles H. Moyer in an effort to introduce the Finnish immigrant to selected American viewpoints on social issues that promoted the company's causes of socialism and unionism. Starting in 1912, the Työmies Publishing Company also began publishing a Finnish-English dictionary. The company reached its height in 1912 with sixty-three workers and while it also reached its financial peak at this time, they were forced to spend some funds on legal costs due to a run in with the federal government over the mailing of “obscene literature” with issues of Lapatossu.

=== Työmies in the 1914 split ===
During the early 1910s, the Finnish socialist movement had become deeply divided between a center-left majority faction (so-called "opportunists"), who sought to use electoral methods to attain state power and to initiate transformative reforms, and a left wing (so-called "impossibilists"), who considered all reformist gradualism to be useless and counterproductive and who instead favored the use of strikes and sabotage by the radical labor movement to bring about a revolutionary change.

The "opportunists" continued to control the Finnish Socialist Federation through the organization's third triennial convention, held in June 1912 in Smithville, Minnesota, forcing the revolutionary industrial unionists to retreat from their support of the direct action methods espoused by the booming Industrial Workers of the World. The radicals continued to agitate for their perspective, however, concentrating their efforts on the Federation-sponsored Work People's College, located at Smithville.

In 1913 a massive strike of copper miners erupted in the Upper Peninsula of Michigan, including a large number of Finns. The strike was long and bitter, stretching into 1914, and ultimately government soldiers were called in to end the strike and restore the production of copper in the mines. The defeat of the strike and widespread blacklisting of strikers further exacerbated the tactical differences among the Finnish-American socialists. It was after this strike that the Työmies relocated its headquarters to Superior, Wisconsin. Rumors suggested that the move was related to a fall in revenue caused in part by a boycott of the paper by anti-socialist businesses in Hancock and in part due to the large sums of money the Työmies contributed to workers during the Copper Country strike of 1913–14. However, internal divisions and perhaps a desire to relocate closer to Minnesota's booming iron ranges, which offered a greater chance to expand their organization, led to the Työmies’ departure from Hancock; the search for a new location preceded the unrest caused by the Copper Miners’ strike.

=== Communist years ===
During its Communist Party phase, which began in about 1920, the circulation of the daily fluctuated in the range of 13,000 to 15,000 copies, declining to around 5,000 in 1950, at which time it was merged with the CPUSA's East Coast Finnish-language newspaper, Eteenpäin, to form Työmies-Eteenpäin.

=== Työmies-Eteenpäin ===
The Työmies-Eteenpäin was established in 1950 to present news on cultural, political, and trade union issues of interest to Finnish Americans. The merger occurred because of diminishing support of communism amongst Finns in the US (and therefore a decreasing readership). However, there had been discussion of a merger between the Työmies and Eteenpäin already in 1935 as it was thought it would be better to merge the papers while they still had a strong following. Työmies-Eteenpäin originally had strong communist leanings, but later mellowed over the decades to become more of a link between Finns in different parts of the United States rather than addressing a political agenda. The paper was published five times a week in the 1950s and later it was published only three times a week.

=== Termination ===
Työmies-Eteenpäin ran from 1950 to 1998, however in 1986 the English-language Finnish American Reporter was established and continues to circulate out of Finlandia University in Hancock, MI, as a politically unaffiliated paper with readership across the United States and Canada.

== See also ==
- Severi Alanne
- Non-English press of the Communist Party USA
