= Non-English press of the Communist Party USA =

Press

During the nine decades since its establishment in 1919, the Communist Party USA produced or inspired a vast array of newspapers and magazines in at least 25 different languages. This list of the non-English press of the Communist Party USA provides basic information on each title, along with links to pages dealing with specific publications in greater depth.

== Non-English press ==
=== Armenian ===
- Panvor (The Worker) (1921–1938) — Daily organ of the Armenian Workers Party and later the Armenian Communist Party, published in New York City. The publication, which resembled a magazine in form and content, published news from Soviet Armenia, theoretical material, and serialized translations of politically oriented fiction. Only a handful of issues have survived in the United States.
  - Lraper (The Herald) (1938-June 1990) — Successor to Panyor, initially published in New York City three times a week, before being reduced to two issues a week in 1964 and to a weekly publication cycle in 1967. The paper was issued by the Armenian Progressive League of America and its affiliated social-benefit society, the Armenian Assistance Committee and moved its production to Los Angeles in 1979. Throughout its existence, Lraper provided news from Soviet Armenia and included works of Marxist theory as well as national news of the Armenian-American community.
- Proletar (The Proletarian) (1924-1926) — Short-lived 4-page weekly newspaper published in New York City. Claimed circulation in 1924 was 1,100 copies.

=== Bulgarian ===
- Suznanie (Consciousness) (December 1923 – 1937) — Weekly newspaper published in Chicago by the Bulgarian Section of the Workers Party of America. The initial editor of the paper was Georgi Radulov, who was succeeded in 1924 by Todor Tsekov, who continued at the helm until 1931. At the 4th National Convention of the Workers (Communist) Party, held in Chicago in August 1925, the circulation of the paper was claimed at 1900 copies. Publication of the paper later moved to Detroit, Michigan. Some copies of the paper exist in Bulgaria but there are no known repositories in North America.

=== Croatian ===
- Glas Komunista (Communist Voice) (1919) — Short-lived Croatian-language newspaper which was published in Chicago in the fall of 1919 as the official organ of Yugoslav adherents of the Communist Party of America. Only one issue is known, dated November 1, 1919.
- Komunista (1921-1922?) — According to Official Bulletin No. 2 of the unified Communist Party of America, a Croatian-language edition of the official organ of the party, The Communist, was "expected" to be provided by the party's South Slavic Federation Language Bureau beginning in the second half of 1921.
- Radnik (The Worker) (July 1922 – September 1935) — In 1922 a split erupted in the South Slavic Federation of the Socialist Labor Party of America, with Communist dissidents leaving that organization and its newspaper, Znanje, to join the new "legal" Workers Party of America. The group established their own publication, Radnik, publishing it as a weekly in Chicago. The paper later went to daily status before returning to a weekly publication cycle. In 1923, the publication's first editors were replaced by Leo Fisher.
  - Glas Radnika (Workers' Voice) (September 1935 – 1936) — Chicago weekly which continued Radnik following the reorganization of the South Slavic section of the Communist Party USA and the establishment of an explicitly Croatian section in 1935.
  - Radnički Glasnik (Workers' Herald) (September 1936 – December 1940) — After the conclusion of the 1st Conference of Croatian Communists in Chicago in May 1936, Glas Radnika was made the official organ of the Croatian Section of the CPUSA and the name was changed to Radnički Glasnik. The paper continued to be published in Chicago on a weekly basis, with F. Borić at the editorial helm.
  - Narodni Glasnik (People's Herald) (December 1940 – August 1973) — In December 1940, Radnički Glasnik changed its name, although its basic political line remained unaltered. During World War II the renamed paper supported the American war effort at home and Josip Broz Tito in Yugoslavia, although when push came to shove following the Stalin-Tito break of 1948, the Narodni Glasnik sided with the Soviet Union rather than with the national communist Yugoslav regime headed by the Croatian Tito. Following the rapprochement between the two countries in the Khrushchev period, the paper softened its critique of communist Yugoslavia accordingly. Editor of the paper was F. Borić, later succeeded by Leo Fisher, who remained in charge until the end of the publication in the summer of 1973.
- Narodni Zajedničar (People's Fraternalist) (1939) — Short-lived Pittsburgh publication launched by Croatian communists who were members of the Croatian Fraternal Union, which had been publishing Zajedničar. No surviving copies known to exist.

=== Czech ===
The Czech-language Obrana published an annual yearbook called Dělník, featuring art, literature, poetry, and articles on political themes.

- Obrana (Defense) (November 1910 – 1938) — Weekly newspaper launched in New York City by the Czech Socialist Section of the Central Labor Union. The publication moved to the left after the 1917 Russian Revolution and sided with the Left Wing Section of the Socialist Party during the factional war of 1919 which resulted in the formation of the American communist movement. The paper was produced in the interim by the "Independent Czechoslovak Marxist Federation," with this group later joining the Communist Party. In 1924 Obrana proclaimed itself the official publication of the Czechoslovak Section of the Workers Party of America. Circulation as of that date was approximately 4,000 copies. The paper moved from weekly to daily status in 1934. Publication was terminated in 1938. An annual yearbook called Dělník (The Worker) was also produced.

=== Danish ===
- Fremad (Forward) (1935) — In February 1935, the Scandinavian Educational Publishing Company in New York City, publisher of the Ny Tid Norwegian-Danish Edition, decided to make that an exclusively Norwegian paper. A Danish-language monthly called Fremad was launched for the Danish readers effected by the decision to move to linguistic homogeneity. The Danish paper was apparently terminated after only a few months; no copies are known to have survived.

=== Estonian ===
- Uus Ilm (New World) (January 1909-1980s?) — Uus Ilm, one of the longest-running radical publications in the United States, was launched as a weekly in New York city by the Central Committee of the American-Estonian Socialist Association. The paper moved to the left after the 1917 Russian Revolution and was the organ of Estonian-speaking communists in America from the 1920s.

=== Finnish ===
- Työmies (The Worker) (July 1903 – August 1950) — The granddaddy of the Finnish-American radical press was Työmies, established in Worcester, Massachusetts in 1903 as Amerikan Suomalainen Työmies (The Finnish-American Worker). In June 1904 the publication was moved to the small town of Hancock, located in the sparsely populated Upper Peninsula of Michigan. The paper remained in that location for a decade before moving to the comparative metropolis of Superior, Wisconsin, a virtual twin city of Duluth, Minnesota. From its earliest days, Työmies was a Marxist publication, significantly more radical than its East Coast counterpart established in January 1905, Raivaaja (The Pioneer). The paper briefly published an English-language paper called Wage Slave, and was the source of a number of annual magazines in the Finnish language. During its Communist Party phase, which began in about 1920, the circulation of the daily fluctuated in the range of 13,000 to 15,000 copies, declining to around 5,000 in 1950, at which time it was consolidated with the CPUSA's East Coast Finnish-language newspaper, Eteenpäin, to form Työmies-Eteenpäin (see below).
- Toveri (The Comrade) (December 1907 – February 1931) — Toveri hailed from the isolated coastal town of Astoria, Oregon, one of two major radical publications produced there by the tightly knit community of "Red Finns" there. The decision of the Finnish Socialist Federation to divide the itself into three districts gave impetus to Finnish-American socialists to launch a newspaper of their own to serve as the voice of the Federation's Western District. In June 1907 a referendum of the Finnish Socialist locals of the West decided to establish a paper for the district and a temporary board of directors was established in Astoria. The venture was capitalized in July through the offer of $5,000 worth of stock at $10 a share. When half of this amount was sold by October, the new holding company, the Western Workmen's Co-operative Publishing Company, was cleared to begin operations. The first issue of the new paper, named Toveri ("The Comrade") appeared on December 7, 1907, under the editorship of Aku Rissanen, formerly on the editorial staff of the Massachusetts Finnish-language socialist newspaper, Raivaaja. Although planned as a bi-weekly, the paper was impacted by an emerging economic crisis and appeared only irregularly during its first year. The paper moved to daily status in 1912. In 1920, the paper's editorial line moved from the Socialist Party camp to a position favoring revolutionary socialism, and the paper soon evolved into a Communist Party organ, which it followed up to its demise. Toveri generally consisted of six pages and included sections for farmers and women, as well as material in English, and it was supported by local advertisers. The printing presses of Toveri were shipped to Soviet Karelia following the paper's closure in 1931.
- Toveritar (The Woman Comrade) (July 1911 – September 1930) — In 1911 the Western District convention of the Finnish Socialist Federation reversed its previous policy and urged its locals to form special women's committees and branches for their female members, with a view to increasing the party's influence among women, who were beginning to gain the right to vote throughout the West. In Astoria this took the form of the establishment of a sewing club, designed for both social and fundraising purposes, and the foundation of a special weekly newspaper for socialist women, Toveritar ("The Woman Comrade"). Toveritar was launched as a weekly in July 1911 and it continued as such until 1930, when the publication was terminated. In addition to news of the socialist movement, Toveritar included household hints, a section dedicated to the youth movement, poetry, and serialized literature (both original work and material in translation). This broad array of content proved to be very successful in attracting readers even from outside the organized radical political movement, as there were few other Finnish-language American publications targeted to women. The paper was terminated at the end of September 1930 in favor of a new women's publication launched under the auspices of Työmies in Superior, Wisconsin.
  - Työlaïsnainen (The Working Woman) (October 1930 – February 1936) — With the termination of Toveritar, a new weekly communist newspaper for women was launched. Työlaïsnainen published national and local news and included articles on matters which impacted women's lives. The paper typically ran to 12 pages, with additional supplements produced for International Women's Day, May Day, and Mother's Day. In 1931 the paper was moved to New York and made part of the CPUSA's Eteenpäin editorial office. In February 1936, the paper was succeeded by Naisten Viiri.
  - Naisten Viiri (The Woman's Banner) (February 1936 – 1978) — Naisten Viiri was the final installment in the series of Finnish-language Communist publications targeted to women, continuing in the path established by Toveritar in 1911 and continued by Työlaïsnainen in 1930. Naisten Viiri was actually the longest running publication of the three, a 12-page weekly that continued to fulfill its role for more than four decades from the time of its launch in 1936. The publication attempted to address itself to a broad cross-section of Finnish-American women by mixing ideological material with general interest material and included news emphasizing themes of importance to women, articles on home economics, short stories, and poetry. The paper was launched in Yonkers, New York by Eteenpäin and moved to Superior, Wisconsin with that publication when it was merged with Työmies, its circulation gradually dwindling over time as the generations of Finnish-Americans fluent in the national tongue died out.
- Lapatossu (The Shoepack) (1911-April 1921) — Perhaps the best known of the Finnish-language radical humor publications, Lapatossu was launched in the fall of 1911 in Hancock, Michigan by Työmies Publishing Co. Initially part of the Socialist Party of America's political orbit, the publication gradually radicalized to a communist position along with the bulk of the Finnish Socialist Federation. The magazine appeared twice a month, usually 12 pages in size, and featured the art of T.K. Sallinen and K.A. Suvanto — the latter being the publication's first editor in 1911 and returning to edit the magazine from 1916 to its termination in 1921.
  - Punikki (The Red) (May 1921 – March 1936) — In a move which coincided chronologically with the launch of the Finnish-language communist newspaper Eteenpäin, K.A. Suvanto's radical humor magazine Lapatossu was rebranded Punikki, "The Red" in May 1921. The size and frequency of the publication remained the same, generally consisting of 12 pages of drawings, stories, and jokes issuing forth from Työmies editorial offices in Superior, Wisconsin. In 1931 the publication was moved to New York state and published under the auspices of the Communist Party's other Finnish-language newspaper, Eteenpäin. Punikki was widely circulated, with its press run moving from just over 10,000 copies at the time of its launch to about 15,000 from 1930 onward.
  - Kansan Huumori (People's Humor) (March 1936 – August 1938) — Final permutation of the Finnish-American red humor magazines, edited during its first year by cartoonist K.A. Suvanto. The magazine marked a move back to Superior, Wisconsin, where it was published by Työmies. Issues generally consisted of 16 pages of stories, poems, jokes, and political cartoons.
- Eteenpäin (Forward) (May 1921 – August 1950) — Finnish-language newspaper established in 1921 when the Finnish Federation's Eastern District newspaper, Raivaaja (The Pioneer) aligned itself with a reorganized Finnish Socialist Federation attached to the Socialist Party of America. Originally published in New York City, Eteenpäin moved to Worcester, Massachusetts in 1922. The paper's editors over the years included some of the key figures of the Finnish-American communist movement, such as Elis Sulkanen, K.E. Heikkinen, and Henry Puro. Eteenpäin was merged with Työmies (The Worker) of Superior, Wisconsin in 1950 as a cost-cutting measure to form Työmies-Eteenpäin.
- The Communist (1921) — According to Official Bulletin No. 2 of the unified Communist Party of America, a Finnish-language edition of the official organ of the party, The Communist, was "expected" to be provided by the party's Finnish Federation Language Bureau beginning in the second half of 1921.
- Uusi Kotimaa (The New Homeland) (1923-December 1934) — In 1923 Finnish-Americans in the Communist Party purchased the old Minnesota newspaper, Uusi Kotimaa, a paper which was established in 1880. Previously conservative, the orientation of the New York Mills, Minnesota newspaper was changed to a radical farmer-labor publication following the Communist Party's line, edited by leading Finnish-American communist K.E. Heikkinen. With the demise of the farmer-labor party strategy, Uusi Kotimaa began to be oriented more towards industrial workers, although generally one page of content was directed towards farmers. The paper appeared three times weekly until 1932, when it was cut back to a weekly publication cycle. In 1931 the paper was moved to Superior, Wisconsin, where it was published directly by the Työmies Publishing Co. until the paper's demise at the end of 1934. An excellent run of the paper exists for the Superior period on three reels of microfilm available from the Wisconsin Historical Society.
- Viesti (The Message) (January 1930 – January 1937) — Finnish-language Marxist theoretical magazine, closely connected to the newspaper Eteenpäin. The paper was launched in Worcester, Massachusetts and later moved to Brooklyn and was edited by Aku Päiviö and later M. Wiitala.
- Työmies-Eteenpäin (The Worker-Forward) (August 1950 – 1995). The joint Finnish-language communist newspaper Työmies-Eteenpäin was established as a cost-cutting measure in 1950 and was published in Superior, Wisconsin through the offices of Työmies. A daily newspaper at its launch, circulation began at the 4,000 copy mark and declined over the course of its existence, falling to less than half that level in the 1970s. The paper continued through 1995, when it was replaced by the English-language publication, The Finnish-American Reporter.

=== German ===
- New Yorker Volkszeitung (New York People's News) (January 1878-October 1932; Communist-line 1919-1925) — Independently owned German-language left wing daily published in New York City. The Volkszeitung began as a publication owing allegiance to the fledgling Socialist Labor Party of America and was a major player in the party splits of 1889 and 1899. In the latter conflict, the dissident faction backed by the Volkszeitung, headed by Henry Slobodin and Morris Hillquit, was defeated by loyalists to party editor Daniel DeLeon, and the Volkszeitung thus followed the group's circuitous path into the Socialist Party of America (SPA) in 1901. For nearly two decades, the Volkszeitung remained loyal to the SPA, until the 1919 party split of that organization, which led to the establishment of the American Communist parties. Volkszeitung editor-in-chief Ludwig Lore was a founding member of the Communist Labor Party of America in 1919 and continued in the highest councils of the party until being expelled in 1925 for "Loreism," proclaimed by Lore's enemies during the bitter factional war which swept the Communist Party in this period to be an indigenous form of Trotskyism. Despite his expulsion, Lore remained at the helm of the Volkszeitung, charting an independent radical course for the paper until his departure in 1931. In 1931 the paper was reorganized with a new editor and it formally endorsed the Socialist Party of America once again. The paper was terminated in the fall of 1932 due to financial difficulties.
- The Communist (1921) — According to Official Bulletin No. 2 of the unified Communist Party of America, a German-language edition of the official organ of the party, The Communist, was "expected" to be provided by the party's German Federation Language Bureau beginning in the second half of 1921.
- Der Arbeiter (The Worker) (September 1927 – February 1937) — Der Arbeiter was the official German-language organ of the Communist Party, published in New York City by the German Language Bureau of the Workers (Communist) Party. The paper began as a monthly, was made a biweekly in April 1928, and went to a weekly publication cycle effective the first day 1930. Publication size also varied over the years, ranging from 2 pages at the launch to as many as 8 pages, with 4 pages being the norm after 1930. The best run of the paper in the United States exists at the New York Public Library, which holds master negative microfilm of the broken run in their collection. The paper was replaced; by Deutsches Volksecho in 1937.
  - Deutsches Volksecho (German People's Echo) (February 1937 – September 1939) — Official German-language weekly of the CPUSA, continuing Der Arbeiter without interruption or change of the publication's volume numbering pattern. The editor of the paper for its entire duration was Stefan Heym. The Deutsches Volksecho published material on the Communist Party's People's Front policy, news from Nazi Germany, and reports on the international anti-fascist movement and contained a women's column, meeting dates of German cultural and political organizations, and advertisements. The paper was abruptly terminated on September 16, 1939, less than a month after the signing of the Molotov–Ribbentrop Pact and barely more than 2 weeks after the September 1 Nazi invasion of Poland which began World War II.
- Die Stimme (The Voice) (June–August? 1933) — Short-lived monthly bulletin of the Philadelphia branch of the Association of Proletarian Freethinkers, American section of the International Proletarian Freethinkers organization based in Basel, Switzerland. Intended as a monthly, only a few numbers seem to have been produced.
- Deutsch-Amerikanisches Arbeiterklub Mitteilungsblatt (Newsletter of the German-American Workers' Clubs) (May 1934 – 1938?) — Organ of the Federation of German-American Workers' Clubs, published irregularly in New York City. The newsletter announced the affairs of its member clubs in such cities as New York, Chicago, Milwaukee, Philadelphia, and Newark, New Jersey and printed articles contributed by radicals from Germany and the United States.
  - Unsere Zeit (Our Time) (January 1940 – September 1942) — Monthly bulletin of the Federation of German-American Workers' Clubs, launched in New York City after a brief lapse of the previous publication, the Mitteilungsblatt. The publication included news from Nazi Germany and occupied Europe and included a women's section and extracts from the American press. In September 1942 the publication was terminated and subscription lists transferred to the German-American.
- Die Einheitsfront (The United Front) (August 1934) — This paper was the organ of a united front effort of the Communist Party called "Anti-Fascist Action" (Antifaschistische Aktion), an effort to unite German-American workers' groups initiated in March 1933. Although intended as a monthly, only one issue of the publication appeared, probably a product of the lack of support of non-Communists for the organization.
- Mitteilungsblatt des Deutsch-Amerikanischen Kulturverbandes (Bulletin of the German-American League for Culture) (1935–1936?) — Official bulletin of the German-American League for Culture. No copies are known to have survived.
  - Mitteilungsblatt des Deutsch-Amerikanischen Kulturverbandes (Ostdistrikt) (Bulletin of the German-American League for Culture [Eastern District]) (November 1939 – 1940?) — Short-lived revival of the Mitteilungsblatt des Deutsch-Amerikanischen Kulturverbandes on behalf of the Eastern District of the German-American League for Culture. No more than one or two numbers were produced, with a specimen dated November 1939 surviving.
- Volksfront (Popular Front) (November 1935 – December 1939) — Launched as a monthly, this was initially the bulletin of the "Action Committee of German Progressive Organizations of Chicago." Succeeding issuing authorities included the German-American League for Culture (1936–1938) and the Cultural Front Press Association (1938–1939). The Volksfront included some articles in English and was produced on a weekly basis from 1938.
- Schiffahrt (Navigation) (January 1936 – July 1939) — Variously titled underground bimonthly bulletin published in New York, targeted to members of the German Seamen's Union. The bulletin was printed on very thin paper for ease of smuggling and distribution back home to Germany. The publication was available for sale in most American harbors during the period and was produced in press runs variously estimated between 1,000 and 4,000 copies per issue. The publication had 12 pages in 1937 and was reduced in size in later years. It was terminated in the summer of 1939 just prior to the signing of the Nazi-Soviet Pact. New York Public Library has master negative microfilm of a number of issues of this publication.
- Deutsche Zentralbücherei Mitteilungsblatt (German Central Library Newsletter) (1936) — In 1935 there was established the Deutsche Zentralbuchhandlung (German Central Bookstore) a publishing house and book distribution office for the sale of anti-fascist and pro-Soviet German-language publications. The Mitteilungsblatt was a bimonthly publication produced in New York City to promote the book club established by the Central Book Store. There may have only been one issue of the publication issued early in 1936, since a column promoting the German Central Bookstore began to appear in Der Arbeiter in March of that year. The German Central Bookstore continued until 1941.
- Das Neue Leben (The New Life) (June–August 1939) — German-American youth monthly launched in New York City by the Communist Party early in the summer of 1939. The publication was terminated, coincidentally or not, with the signing of the Nazi-Soviet Pact. The first issue was typeset and issues two and three were produced via mimeograph.
- Youth Outlook (November–December 1939) — German-American youth monthly produced by the German-American Youth Federation. Content was bilingual in English and German, with the title and front page entirely printed in English and German content inside. In accord with the Communist Party USA's line of the day, the monthly has been characterized as "anti-British, anti-French, and anti-war."
- German-American Emergency Conference Bulletin (March–April 1942) — Forerunner of The German-American. No issues of this brief monthly publication has not survived and it is unclear as to whether content was in English, German, or a combination of both languages.
  - The German-American/Der Deutsch-Amerikaner (May 1942 – May 1968) — Long-running communist publication published in New York City, generally issued monthly in 8 to 12 pages, with content in English and German. During the war, the chief emphasis of the publication related to drumming up support for the war effort among German-Americans; after the war, content became concerned with problems of reconstruction. From about 1950, the publication was heavily skewed towards coverage of news from East Germany with very little content related to news of the United States. The publication was heavily illustrated with cartoons and portraits and included literary material, a women's section, and a youth section written in English.

=== Greek ===
- He Phone tou Ergatou (The Voice of the Worker) (1918–1923) — New York weekly published by the Greek Socialist Union in America. The paper became the organ of the Greek Section of the Workers Party of America in February 1922.
  - Empros (Forward) (July 1923 – August 1938) — Successor to He Phone tou Ergatou, rechristened as such in the summer of 1923.' Beginning as a weekly, In July 1927 Empros moved to a daily publication schedule, but this change lasted only 8 months before it was forced to return to monthly status.
  - Eleftheria (Liberty) (August 1938 – April 1941) — In August 1938, Empros was renamed Eleftheria and moved back to a daily production cycle. The publication's offices remained in New York City.
  - Helleno-Amerikanikon Vema (Greek-American Tribune) (April 1941 – 1949) — In April 1941, the daily Eleftheria was discontinued and relaunched as a weekly called Helleno-Amerikanikon Vema. The paper continued until 1949, when anticommunist legislation brought about its demise.
- Ergatis Thalassis (The Seaman) (December 1944 – February 1946) — New York monthly issued by the "Federation of Greek Maritime Unions," promoting a consistently left wing political line.

=== Hungarian ===
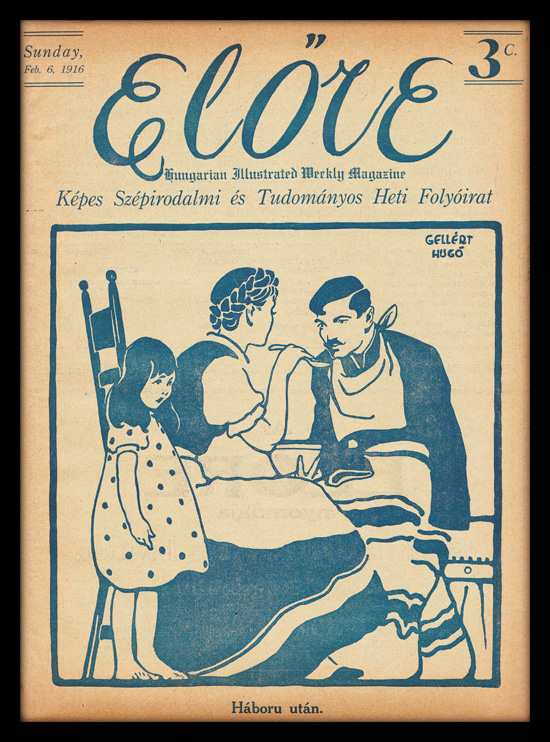
The point of reference of the Hungarian Communist press was Előre, radical weekly of the Hungarian Federation of the Socialist Party of America. This February 1916 cover drawing by Hugo Gellert depicts an armless war veteran being spoon-fed.

- Előre (Forward) (September 1905 – October 1921) — Előre was the official organ of the Hungarian Socialist Federation, a weekly magazine first published in New York City in 1905 which came under the direct control of the Socialist Party of America (SPA) in 1915. Előre was a staunch supporter of the SPA's anti-militarist position against World War I — a position which put it on a collision course with the administration of President Woodrow Wilson when he led America into the European conflict in the spring of 1918. The government impeded the mailing of the publication and conducted police investigations of its editorial staff, forcing the paper to the financial brink. When the Hungarian Socialist Federation was suspended from the SPA during the factional war of 1919 for having lent its support to the Left Wing Section of the Socialist Party, supporters of the Communist Party of America gained control over the publication. The publication declared bankruptcy in October 1921, apparently to clear its debts, and was succeeded by a newly named New York publication only 10 days later, Új Előre.
  - Új Előre (New Forward) (1921–1937) — Új Előre was a Communist Party-sponsored publication from the outset and it gave great attention to the ongoing situation in Hungary in the aftermath of the failed 1919 Hungarian Revolution. The publication was nominally edited by an American citizen, but the key editorial work was done by an editorial board dominated by emigrants from Soviet Hungary, including Lajos Köves, János Lassen, and Lajos Bebrits. In 1931 the publication was moved from New York City to Cleveland, a decision which was reversed in 1937. Economic problems combined with a desire to remake the publication as a less partisan Popular Front newspaper led to its discontinuation in 1937 in favor of the weekly Amerikai Magyar Világ.
  - Amerikai Magyar Világ (Hungarian World in America) (1937–1938) — The Amerikai Magyar Világ was a daily newspaper published in New York City which made use of the slogan "Peace, progress, and people's rights" and attempted to build a broad anti-fascist coalition among Hungarian-speaking Americans. Circulation was about 6,000 copies per issue and the complete run of the publication has survived and is available on microfilm. The publication proved to be financially unstable, however, and the daily was terminated in less than a year, to be replaced by Magyar Jővó.
  - Magyar Jövő (Hungarian Future) (December 1938 – 1952) — While standing officially as the organ of the Hungarian section of the International Workers' Order, the first issue of Magyar Jövő was listed as "Volume 37, No. 1, indicating its place as continuer of Előre and its successors. As with Amerikai Magyar Világ, Magyar Jövő continued with a Popular Front orientation, albeit as a weekly rather than a daily published in New York. The publication came under attack during the era of McCarthyism and the publication was terminated, with the editors continuing to publish Amerikai Magyar Szó.
  - Amerikai Magyar Szó (Hungarian Word in America) (1952-date) — This New York-based tabloid was the effective continuation of Magyar Jövő. The weekly featured articles from the Hungarian press and took a generally communist line, while stressing its democratic character during the Cold War era. Published today by the non-profit American Hungarian Federation, dating itself back to 1906 and claiming to be "among the oldest ethnic organizations in the country." According to the American Hungarian Federation, the organization raised over $512,000 and aided in the resettlement of 65,000 Hungarian refugees following the failed 1956 Hungarian uprising against Soviet control.
- The Communist (1921) — According to Official Bulletin No. 2 of the unified Communist Party of America, a Hungarian-language edition of the official organ of the party, The Communist, was "expected" to be provided by the party's Hungarian Federation Language Bureau beginning in the second half of 1921.
- Kultúrharc (Cultural Struggle) (November 1931 – 1935) — Hungarian-language artistic and literary monthly magazine, published in New York City. The magazine, launching with a circulation of about 1500 copies, published short stories, poems, accounts of scientific lectures and theatrical performances, and educational materials. The magazine ultimately fell victim to financial difficulties and differences among the editorial staff and terminated publication in 1935.
- Nők Világa (Women's World) (September 1934 – September 1970) — This Hungarian-language communist monthly magazine first appeared as a mimeographed newsletter called Munkásnő (Working Woman), a publication which had a press run of only a few hundred copies. In September 1934 this publication was rebranded as the monthly newspaper Nők Világa, published in New York City. All editors of the publication were Hungarian-American Communist women.
- Patronati (Patronati) (1935–1936) — The Patronati organization was established in 1934 with the purpose of generating financial support for the Communist International's International Red Aid organization and assisting anti-fascist activities in Hungary. The publication was merged with Új Előre in 1936, after which time the Patronati organization was given a column in that publication to publish its news.
- A Tény (The Fact) (October 1947 – 1950) — Initially a mimeographed newsletter, this Los Angeles publication was printed from 1948 and covered news from Hungary. It supported the line of the Communist Party of Hungary and polemicized against the conservative views of newly arriving Hungarian émigrés.

=== Italian ===
- L'Alba Nuova (The New Dawn) (September 1921 – May 1924) — Although it was best known as the official organ of the Italian Federation of the Workers Party of America, established as the "legal" adjunct of the underground Communist Party of America in the last days of 1921, L'Alba Nuova actually predated the establishment of that organization by several months. The paper began as a monthly published in New York City before moving to a weekly publication cycle and was formally published by the "Mario Rapisardi Literary Society."
  - Il Lavoratore (The Worker) (June 1924 – September 1931) — In 1924, the Workers Party of America's press nexus moved from New York City to Chicago. The New York Italian-language weekly L'Alba Nuova was supplanted by a new Chicago daily at this time, Il Lavoratore, edited by Antonio Presi of that earlier publication. This Chicago phase proved to be brief, however, as in 1925 Il Lavoratore was moved back to New York and made a weekly, with G. Cannata at the editorial desk. The paper strove to build a united front against the fascist Mussolini government in Italy and covered trade union activities from a radical rank-and-file perspective. The publication's claimed circulation in 1925 was 12,500.
- La Difesa de Il Lavoratore (The Defense of The Worker) (1931) — Short-lived bulletin produced by means of mimeograph in New York in order to collect funds for a restart of Il Lavoratore, which had been shut down by the CPUSA for budgetary reasons. The biweekly bulletin also attempted to keep its readers apprised of the activities of the Communist Party among the Italian-American community.
- L'Unità del Popolo (Unity of the People) (May 1939 – August 1951) — At the time of the outbreak of World War II, L'Unità del Popolo was the only official publication of the Communist Party of Italy (PCI) in the world. The paper was published weekly in New York City and presented the official PCI view of unfolding European affairs. It is unclear whether ownership of the paper remained vested in the PCI or whether it was transferred to status as an organ of the CPUSA during the post-war years. The publication moved to monthly status during its final years.
- Lo Stato Operaio (The Workers' State) (March 1940 – December 1943) — This was actually another publication of the Communist Party of Italy, published in exile in New York City after its suppression by the government of France at the start of the war. The publication maintained a limited circulation in the United States, with a very few copies being sent back for underground distribution in Italy. The paper was too far away from the center of activities of the PCI to have any real political significance and was discontinued by the party at the end of 1943.

=== Latvian ===
- Strādnieks (The Worker) (1906–1919) — Official organ of the Latvian socialist movement, published in Boston. The Latvian socialists of the Boston area were among the earliest and most energetic supporters of the Left Wing Section of the Socialist Party and went over en bloc to the Communist Party of America in the summer of 1919. During World War I the paper was banned by the U.S. postal authorities and was replaced by Atbalss, which also fell afoul of postal authorities. In 1918, a publication called Biļetens (The Bulletin) was launched, continuing until the postal ban was lifted and Strādnieks briefly reappeared in 1919.
  - Rīts (The Morning) (January 1920 – December 1922) — Succeeding Strādnieks, this was official organ of the Latvian section of the Communist Party of America, published in Boston on a weekly basis.
  - Strādnieku Rīts (Workers' Morning) (January 1923 – December 1934) — Latvian communist weekly published in Boston succeeding Rīts. First editor was Rūdolfs Zālītis. As was the case with its predecessor, the paper was banned in Latvia.
- Komunists (The Communist) (1917) — Short-lived Latvian language American publication mentioned in Strādnieks in 1917. No copies known to have survived.
- Komunists (The Communist) (1919–1921) — Latvian-language edition of the "illegal" organ of the Communist Party of America.
- Liesma (The Flame) (1919) — Short-lived communist publication, documented by being mentioned in the Latvian communist press in 1919. No copies known to have survived.
- Āzis (Billy Goat) (1919) — Short-lived communist publication, documented by being mentioned in the Latvian communist press in 1919. No copies known to have survived.
- Komunists (The Communist) (1921-1922?) — According to Official Bulletin No. 2 of the unified Communist Party of America, a Latvian-language edition of the official organ of the party, The Communist, was "expected" to be provided by the party's Lettish Federation Language Bureau beginning in the second half of 1921.
- Amerikas Cīņa (Struggle of America) (March 1926 – 1934) — A self-described "political, literary, and scholarly newspaper" published in Chicago. Official Latvian organ of the Workers (Communist) Party of America and the American Latvian Workers' Union from the end of August 1928, the paper was initially a bimonthly before moving to monthly status at the beginning of 1934. Amerikas Cīņa was initially produced in the office of the Daily Worker in Chicago and New York, before moving to Boston. The first editor was Jānis Pallo and the fourth and final editor was Kārlis "Charles" Dirba, a former Executive Secretary of the underground Communist Party of America.
  - Strādnieku Cīņa (Workers' Struggle) (January 1935 – 1939) — Successor to Amerikas Cīņa and Strādnieku Rīts through merger, Strādnieku Cīņa was published in Boston and covered news from Latvia and the Soviet Union and published literary works along with political fare. The editorial board included, among others, Kārlis "Charles" Dirba.
  - Amerikas Latvietis (American Latvian) (January 1940 – 1976) — Paper launched in Roxbury, Massachusetts following the termination of Strādnieku Cīņa in 1939. Launched as a weekly, the paper was soon moved to a biweekly publication cycle.

=== Lithuanian ===
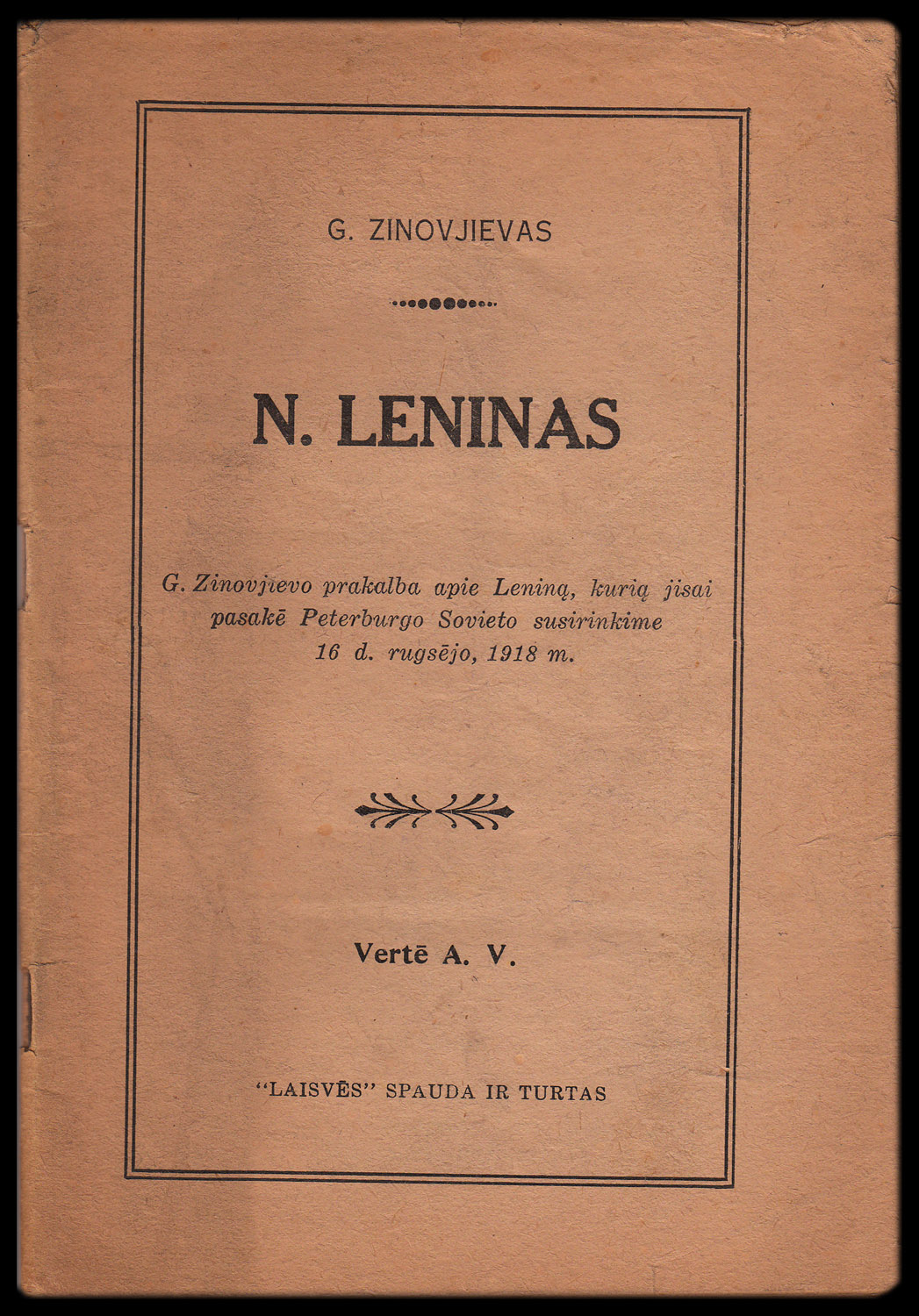
Laisvē, like many other non-English newspapers associated with the Communist Party, also published books and pamphlets, such as this 1919 biography of Lenin by Grigorii Zinoviev.

- Laisvė (Freedom) (1911-1986) — Originally a Socialist Party publication published in Boston, in 1919 Laisvē transferred its allegiance along with the rest of the Lithuanian Socialist Federation to the new Communist Party of America and its editorial offices were moved to Ozone Park, New York. Circulation peaked in 1920 at just under 18,000 copies per issue. The paper carried national and international news and reprints from the Lithuanian press. Editors included top Lithuanian-American Communist Party leaders Rojus Mizara (1937–1967) and Antanas "Anthony" Bimba (1967–1983). The Library of Congress holds master negative microfilm of the publication for the years 1941 to 1964.
- Darbininkių balsas (Workers' Voice) (1916-1925+) — Not to be confused with the Baltimore IWW publication of the same name, Darbininkių Balsas was a monthly published in New York City by the Lithuanian Women's Progressive Alliance of America and came into the orbit of the Communist Party with the rest of the Lithuanian Socialist Federation in 1919. Claimed circulation of the 24-page magazine in 1924 was 4,000.
- Darbas (The Worker) (1919-1920) — Darbas was launched in Brooklyn, New York in October 1919 by V. Poška as an organ of the Amalgamated Clothing Workers of America. The non-party trade unionist Poška was soon replaced by political radicals V. Prusika and Antanas "Anthony" Bimba, however, and the bi-weekly was turned into a Communist publication. It is believed that a total of six numbers of the short-lived publication were produced.
- Vilnis (The Surge) (1920-date) — Originally the Communist Party's Chicago Lithuanian-language weekly newspaper, Vilnis went to daily status in September 1926. By 1930, circulation topped 37,000 copies. By the second half of the 1980s, circulation had fallen to less than 3500. The paper presumably operates under a fully independent status today.
- Kommunistas (The Communist) (1920–1922?) — Lithuanian-language edition of the "illegal" official organ of the underground Communist Party of America. Editor was Joazas Baltrusaitis, who published the paper in New York City.
- Kova (The Struggle) (May 1920 – 1922) — New York monthly borrowing the name of the influential official organ of the Lithuanian Socialist Federation, which was issued from 1905 to the end of 1918. Officially published by the "Lithuanian Communist League," the editor after the first issue was key Lithuanian-American Communist Party leader Antanas Bimba.
- Tiesa (The Truth) (August 1930-1980s?) — The fraternal benefit society the Lithuanian Alliance of America split in 1930, with the communist faction establishing their own official organ, Tiesa, from Lithuanian Communist headquarters in Ozone Park, New York. First editor of the publication was Rojus Mizara, who moved over to assume the editorship of Laisvė in 1937.
- Darbininkė (The Woman Worker) (1932–1934) — Magazine published in Brooklyn, New York. Intended as a monthly, only 17 issues were produced at irregular intervals during the periodical's existence. Included political analysis and literary fare by an array of leading Lithuanian-American communist writers.
- Šviesa (The Light) (1933-1980s?) — Quarterly Lithuanian-language communist cultural and literary magazine published by the Lithuanian section of the Communist Party USA from its headquarters in Ozone Park, New York. First editor of the paper was Antanas Bimba.
- Liaudies Menas (The People's Art) (1950–1951) — Short lived Communist artistic-literary paper published in Chicago. Only nine issues of the publication appeared.

=== Norwegian/Danish ===
- Social-Demokraten (The Social Democrat) (October 1911 – March 1921) — Official organ of the Scandinavian Socialist Federation of the Socialist Party of America, this Chicago publication turned to revolutionary socialism with the assumption of editorial tasks by N. Juel Christensen at the end of 1918. Christensen was later succeeded by Communist Party member Arne Swabeck, writing under the pseudonym "Max Everhart." The publication maintained a circulation of about 2,000 and survived a tenuous financial situation throughout its entire existence. In its final phase the publication switched to English effective with its March 18, 1921 issue and attempted to reinvent itself as New World. This English-language paper was transformed in July 1921 to Voice of Labor, the Communist Party's "legal" English-language weekly published in Chicago. A broken run of Social-Demokraten is available on microfilm from the Illinois State Historical Society; film of broken runs of Voice of Labor exist from the same source as well as the Wisconsin Historical Society.
- Ny Tid Norwegian-Danish Edition (New Era) (December 1933 – January 1936) — For a little over two years there were two versions of Ny Tid produced — one in Swedish and another in Norwegian and Danish. Publisher of the latter edition was the Scandinavian Educational Publishing Company in New York City. This publication was itself briefly split into the Norwegian Ny Tid and the Danish monthly Fremad in February 1935, but the decision seems to have been quickly reversed.
- SAFA (SAFA) (June 1934) — A single issue is known to exist of SAFA, the internal discussion bulletin of the Skandinaviska Arbetaförbundet i America (Scandinavian Workers League). The bulletin included material in Norwegian, Danish, and Swedish, with "Youth Section" material published in English.
- På Tørn (On Turn) (September 1936 – July 1941) — På Tørn was a Norwegian and Danish weekly published in New York City on behalf of the Scandinavian Seamen's Club. The club had ties to the Scandinavian Workers League and the Scandinavian Bureau of the Communist Party USA, but displayed no formal party affiliation in its pages.

=== Polish ===
- Głos Robotniczy (Workers' Voice) (1916–1929) — Launched in 1916 in Pittsburgh, initially as the organ of the Polish Miners' Union. The paper went daily as Codzienny Głos Robotniczy (Daily Workers' Voice) in Pittsburgh in 1917 as the publication of the left wing Polish Section of the Socialist Party, before moving to Detroit in 1919 as the organ of the Polish Section of the Communist Party. Editors included Daniel Elbaum in 1919 and Bolesław "Bill" Gebert in 1920-1922 and again from 1924 to 1925. This was the "legal" organ of the Polish-language communist movement during the underground period. The paper's circulation in 1923 was just over 15,000.
- Kommunista (The Communist) (1920–1921) — Polish edition of the monthly underground official organ of the Communist Party of America. An "illegal" publication with few surviving copies.
  - Kommunista (The Communist) (1921-1922?) — According to Official Bulletin No. 2 of the unified Communist Party of America, a Polish-language edition of the official organ of the party, The Communist, was "expected" to be provided by the party's Polish Federation Language Bureau beginning in the second half of 1921.
  - Trybuna Robotnicza (The Workers' Tribune) (1924–1929) — Successor to the underground Kommunista, this was also the publication of the American Communist Party's Polish Bureau after the dissolution of the underground party and the establishment of the "legal political party," the Workers Party of America. The paper included a section devoted to young Polish-Americans written in English.
- Głos Ludowy (People's Voice) (1930–1979) — Successor to Głos Robotniczy and Trybuna Robotnicza, also published in Detroit. The exact date of the publication's launch is undetermined, probably sometime in 1930. Głos Ludowy, formed as the result of merger of two publications, was later merged again with the Toronto communist publication Kronika Tygodniowa. The paper was produced daily through 1935, then weekly through 1937, and monthly after that and included an English-language section from July 1936 forward.

=== Romanian ===
- Deșteptarea (The Awakening) (January 1914 – February 1938) — Desteptarea began as a Detroit weekly issued by the Federation of Romanian Socialists in America and ended up as a bankrupt Detroit monthly, moving its offices along the way to Cleveland and Chicago. The paper became the official organ of the Romanian section of the Workers Party of America during the early 1920s and the Romanian section of the International Workers Order in the 1930s. Desteptarea was one of the smallest circulation Communist Party language papers, with a press run of just 500 copies in 1925. Somewhat surprisingly, a complete run of the publication has survived.
- Românul American (Romanian American) (June 1938 – January 1967) — Although the Detroit Romanian-language monthly Desteptarea went down early in 1938, Romanian-American communists did not have long to wait before a new publication emerged, Românul American, also published in Detroit. The paper focused on the Soviet Union, the Communist Party of Romania, and strike activity of the international labor movement.

=== Russian ===
- Novyi Mir (New World) (April 1911 – September 1938) — Originally an independent Russian-language socialist newspaper published in New York, Novyi Mir became the official organ of the Russian Socialist Federation of the Socialist Party around 1917 and one of the leading publications of the Left Wing Section of the Socialist Party in 1919. An excellent run of the publication has survived for the dates July 1917 to July 1919, available on microfilm from New York Public Library, with only sporadic issues outside of those dates. Publication was suspended during the Red Scare of 1920. Novyi Mir was absorbed by Russkii Golos in 1938.
- Pravda (Truth) (1919–1920) — Apparently launched prior to the shattering of the Socialist Party of America in the summer of 1919, this paper became the Russian-language organ of the Communist Labor Party. Editors were presumably Gregory Weinstein and Abram Jakira. Existence documented through the weekly reports of Bureau of Investigation agents, no surviving copies known.
- Rabochaia Bor'ba (Workers' Struggle) (April 1920) — Short-lived Russian-language paper published in Chicago by the breakaway Ruthenberg faction of the CPA, edited by Leonid Belsky (Fisher). Existence of an issue published April 18, 1920 documented through the report of Bureau of Investigation Special Agent August H. Loula. No surviving copies known.
- Kommunist (The Communist) (1920–1921) — Russian-language edition of the "illegal" official organ of the underground Communist Party of America. One or two surviving copies in Comintern archive, Moscow.
  - Kommunist (The Communist) (1921-1922?) — According to Official Bulletin No. 2 of the unified Communist Party of America, a Russian-language edition of the official organ of the party, The Communist, was "expected" to be provided by the party's Russian Federation Language Bureau beginning in the second half of 1921.
- Russkii Golos (Russian Voice) (1916-date) — An independent left wing Russian-language publication, pro-Soviet throughout the existence of the USSR. Absorbed Novyi Mir in 1938.

=== Serbian ===
- Slobodna Reč (Free Speech) (December 1934 – July 1951) — This paper was launched in New York City by Serbian-American communists in an effort to counteract the perceived ill effects of other Serbian-language publications in America. Over the years the paper was also published in Pittsburgh and Chicago, before returning to Pittsburgh in 1941 for its final decade of publication there. The paper's frequency of publication also varied greatly over the years, being issued anywhere from 1 to 3 times a week.

=== Slovak ===
- Rovnosť Ľudu (Equality of the People) (October 1906 – May 1935) — The oldest Slovak-language labor union periodical in America, Rovnosť Ľudu was founded in 1906 by Chicago area Slovak émigrés who had banded together four years previously as the Section of Slovak Socialists in Chicago. Initially a monthly, the publication went to a weekly schedule in 1908 and later became a daily. First editor J. Jesensky was sympathetic to a radical interpretation of socialism and in the 1919 split of the Socialist Party of America the publication cast its lot with the Communist Party of America. An excellent run of the paper is available on master negative microfilm held by the Wisconsin Historical Society, running from late-1909 until mid-1926.
  - Ľudový Denník (The People's Daily) (June 1935 – 1948) — Chicago-based weekly issued following the termination of Rovnosť Ľudu. The paper found itself force to depart Chicago and to change its name in 1948 in response to official investigations of American communism.
  - Ľudové Noviny (The People's Newspaper) (1948–1981) — Weekly magazine published in Pittsburgh that continued Ľudový Denník, which found itself forced to change its title and place of publication due to an official investigation of the American radical press that was part of the Second Red Scare of the post-World War II period. After the 1948 investigations were over, the publication returned to Chicago, although keeping the new name.
- Naša Mládež (Our Youth) (1924–1930) — Official youth organ of the Slovak Labor Society, published quarterly in Newark, New Jersey. The publication sometimes published material in Slovak and English, sometimes in parallel, other times in one language or the other. Circulation of the paper in 1925 was 400 copies; only a few copies have survived.
- Pravda (May 1933 – 1948) — Small circulation Slovak-language communist paper published in Chicago, published by the "Society of Slovak Communists in the USA." The paper included material on daily factory life, news from Slovakia and the Soviet Union, and featured a women's page dealing with Slovak women's groups in the United States and the need for female emancipation.

=== Slovenian ===
- Delavska Slovenija (Workers' Slovenia) (January 1922 – September 1926) — Delavska Slovenija was a Milwaukee weekly that traced its roots to three apolitical newspapers of the previous decade — Vestnik (The Courier, 1913), Bodočnost (The Future, 1913), and Slovenija (Slovenia, 1915). The paper was sold to the communist Yugoslav Educational Club in Milwaukee, which launched Delavska Slovenija concurrently with the formation of the "legal" Workers Party of America in January 1922. This first Slovenian-American communist newspaper was moved to Chicago in 1925, and it continued there until September 1926, at which time its name was changed to Delavec. Editor of the paper was "Frank Charles Novak," a pseudonym of Ernst Bartulović, a recent arrival to America who had been active in the Berlin communist movement.
  - Delavec (The Worker) (1926–1928) — Although a majority of Slovenian-American radicals maintained loyalty to the Socialist Party of America, the Workers (Communist) Party determined that a need remained for a Slovenian-language newspaper. Delavec was ostensibly published by the "South Slavic Workers Library," although the paper subtitled itself as an "Organ of the Workers (Communist) Party" atop of page 1. While the circulation of the paper throughout its tenure was stable at the 6800 mark, beginning in May 1928 it began to be published irregularly. The paper was terminated by the end of the year due to financial problems.
- Naprej (Forward) (April 1935 – July 1941) — This Pittsburgh paper, first issued as a semimonthly tabloid before going to weekly status as a broadsheet in October 1937, was directed at Slovenian workers in the United States and Canada. The paper carried on a bitter polemic with Proletarec, the popular and influential Slovenian-language newspaper of the Socialist Party of America. In July 1940 the paper was moved to Cleveland, where it returned to a semimonthly publication schedule before expiring a year later.

=== Spanish ===
- Vida Obrera (Life of the Worker) (1929 - October 1932) — New York City weekly, launched in 1929 under the editorship of the 24-year-old Luís Martínez. During January 1931 three issues of an alternative publication called El Obrero (The Worker) was produced owing to the temporary suppression of La Vida Obrera by the authorities. The publication was suspended from July to October 1931 before being relaunched for a final year. A partial run of the paper is available on master negative microfilm held by the New York Public Library.
- Pueblos Hispanos (Hispanic Peoples) (February 1943 – October 1944) — New York City newspaper which was initially launched by émigrés from the Spanish Republic and which was later staffed by Puerto Rican and Cuban-Americans. A substantial run of the publication is held by the New York Public Library.
- Liberación — Weekly published in New York, of which Aurelio Perez was editor; Bernardo Veda, managing editor; and Carmen Meana, business manager.
- El Boricua — Published in Puerto Rico and circulated in the United States exclusively.
- Puerto Rico Libre — Weekly circulated in the United States.

=== Swedish ===
- Ny Tid (New Era) (March 1922 – July 1936) — Scandinavian weekly published in Chicago by the Scandinavian Workers' Educational Society and including both Swedish and Norwegian/Danish content. The paper was formed by the merger of the Chicago Norwegian paper Facklan with the former Socialist Labor Party paper Folket (The People), the organ of an expelled left wing section of the Scandinavian Federation of the SLP. With the formation of the "legal" Workers Party of America over the New Years' holiday 1922, the Swedish SLP group had entered the new organization, paving the way for a joint newspaper. In April 1931, publication of the Ny Tid moved from Chicago to New York City. Editors of the paper included Oscar W. Larsen (1922), Charles Fredzen (1922), Daniel Birgers (1922–1925), Allan Wallenius (as "Ellis Peterson") (1925–1929), and Albert Pearson (1929–1936). The paper published a Children's section in English from 1928 to 1932. Direct spin-offs included the Ny Tid Norwegian-Danish Edition (1933–1936) and the short-lived Danish paper Fremad (1935).
- Kamraten (The Comrade) (1922) — Internal discussion bulletin of the United Scandinavian Socialist Federation, formed in December 1921 through a merger of the pro-Communist Scandinavian Socialist Federation, formerly affiliated with the Socialist Party of America, and the expelled majority of the Scandinavian Socialist Labor Federation of the Socialist Labor Party. Issues for May and November 1922 have survived; it is not known whether there were additional numbers before, after, or between these dates, although the publication touted itself as a monthly.
- Vägbrytaren (The Breakwater) (1926) — Short-lived radical social temperance paper published in Chicago, touted in an issue Ny Tid. No issues are known to have survived.
- Amerika-Narren (America-Fool) (September–November 1927) — Three issues of this Swedish communist comedy magazine were produced, with the concept consciously borrowed from the Finnish-language Punikki by Allan Wallenius, editor of Ny Tid and driving force behind this publication. Amerika-Narren's editor was Arvid Rostöm, who in the spirit of the project signed himself backwards on the masthead as "Divra Mörtsor." The title of the publication is a pun on the bourgeois Swedish-language newspaper Svenska Amerikanaren (Swedish American), also published in Chicago.
- Storsmockan (The Hammer Blow) (1928-October 1930) — Mimeographed local publication of the Boston Scandinavian Study Club, published irregularly. A few issues have survived.
- Skandinaviska Good Templaren (The Scandinavian Good Templar) (July 1928 – June 1930) — For a two-year term, Communist David Ivar Johnson was elected editor of the monthly publication of the Scandinavian section of the International Order of Good Templars, a secular temperance organization. Johnson edited the paper in accord with the Communist Party line during that interval. Johnson was not appointed to another term in 1930.
- Karbasen (The Whip) (c. 1926) — Local publication produced by the Worcester Scandinavian Workers' Club. The only surviving issue is dated May 1926 and it is not known when the publication started or at what point it changed its name to Fribrytaren.
  - Fribrytaren (The Freebooter) (c. 1928-1929?) — Local publication produced by the Worcester Scandinavian Workers' Club. Six issues are believed to have been produced, of which just two have survived.
- Organisatören (The Organizer) (June 1930) — Mimeographed internal discussion bulletin for officials of local affiliates of the Scandinavian Workers League. Slated to be a monthly publication, only one copy of the debut issue has survived and it is unknown whether any further numbers were issued.
- Skandinaviska Arbetarnas Bildningsförbund: New England Distrikt Bulletin (Scandinavian Workers Educational League: New England District Bulletin) (1931) — The Scandinavian Workers Educational League was intended as a "mass organization" designed to draw lodges of the secular temperance group the International Order of Good Templars and various local sickness and benefit societies into the Communist Party's orbit. The League was divided into three districts, with Worcester, Massachusetts the center of the East. This was the publication of the Eastern district of the Scandinavian Workers Educational League. Only the debut issue has survived.
- Gnistan (The Spark) (August 1930 – August 1932) — Small circulation mimeographed publication of the Finnish Young People's Society, a group founded in 1929 to carry on pro-communist agitation among the American community of Swedish-speaking Finns. No copies are known to have survived.
- Klasskämpen (The Class Fighter) (October 1932) — Local publication produced by the Cleveland Scandinavian Workers' Club. Only a single copy of the debut issue, dated October 1932, has survived and it is not known whether any additional numbers were produced.
- Organisatören (The Organizer) (September–October 1933) — Mimeographed internal discussion bulletin for officials of Illinois clubs of the Scandinavian Workers League. The first two issues have survived and it is not known whether any further numbers were issued.
- Enhetsfront (United Front) (c. 1933) — Short-lived mimeographed Boston publication dealing with unemployment, the rights of foreign-born workers, and the antimilitarism campaign. No copies are known to have survived.
- Enighet (Unity) (c. 1933) — Short-lived Chicago monthly, probably produced with a mimeograph, published by the Scandinavian Workers Unity League, a group established in 1932 and terminated in 1937. No copies are known to have survived.
- Nya Vestkusten (New West Coast) (July 1935) — Local publication of the San Francisco Scandinavian Workers' Club. Scholars believe there was only one number issued. No copies have survived.
- Svenska Vecko Nyheter (Swedish Weekly News) (February 1937) — Pilot issue of a 12-page Swedish-American communist weekly, which included 2 pages in English. This Chicago paper was constructed on a "People's Front" basis, with a good deal of coverage of news from Sweden and on the activities of various Swedish fraternal orders in America with comparatively little left wing political content. Budgetary issues seem to have caused a scrapping of the project, with only a single number dated February 20, 1937, coming off the press.
- Förbundsnytt (League News) (January–March 1938) — Short-lived bimonthly newsletter of the Scandinavian Workers League of America, issued due to the closure of Ny Tid.

=== Ukrainian ===
- Robitnyk (The Worker) (January 1914 – June 1918) — Robitnyk was originally the official organ of the Ukrainian Federation of the American Socialist Party and was published in Cleveland, Ohio from the beginning of 1914. The paper was staunchly anti-militarist and an early supporter of the Zimmerwald Left internationally and the organized Left Wing Section of the Socialist Party domestically. In 1918 the paper's editorial staff was arrested by the police and publication was suspended from July 1918 for the duration of World War I. An excellent run of the publication is available on master negative microfilm held by the New York Public Library. After conclusion of the war, the publication moved its editorial offices to New York City and relaunched as a new paper called Robitnychyi Vistnyk.
  - Robitnychyi Vistnyk (Workers' Herald) (1919–1923) continued the activity of the suspended Robitnyk. The publication included the humorous monthly supplement Molot (The Hammer) as well as a women's section, Robitnytsia (The Working Woman). The publication was terminated in 1923.
- Ukraïns'ki Visti (Ukrainian News) (January 1920-date) — Ukraïns'ki Visti began as a daily newspaper in January 1920 called Ukraïns'ki Shchodenni Visti (Ukrainian Daily News), published in New York City. The publication was initially sponsored by the Ukrainian Section of the Communist Party, with the name of the sponsoring institution changed to the Union of Ukrainian Workers' Organizations from 1923 and the Ukrainian Section of the International Workers Order from the 1930s. After 1941 the name of the sponsoring authority was again changed, this time to the League of Ukrainian-Americas. Beginning in 1949, the Ukraïns'ki Visti began publishing English-language material along with its usual fare in Ukrainian. Circulation of the paper surpassed the 16,000 mark in 1927 before entering a long downward slide. Circulation in 1983 stood at 1670 copies.
- Kommunist (The Communist) (1920–1921?) — This was the Ukrainian-language edition of the "illegal" party organ of the United Communist Party of America, published in New York City.
- Kommunist (1921-1922?) — According to Official Bulletin No. 2 of the unified Communist Party of America, a Ukrainian-language edition of the official organ of the party, The Communist, was "expected" to be provided by the party's Ukrainian Federation Language Bureau beginning in the second half of 1921.
- Nash Shliakh (Our Road) (1920) — Short-lived newspaper published in New York City, edited by E. Kruk. No copies are known to have survived.
  - Chervona Zoria (Red Dawn) (1921) — Short-lived newspaper published in New York City, edited by E. Kruk. No copies are known to have survived.
  - Robitnycha Pravda (Workers' Truth) (1922) — Short-lived newspaper published in New York City, edited by E. Kruk. No copies are known to have survived.
- Hromads'kyi Holos (Voice of Commonwealth) (January 1941 – 1957) — Originally a monthly, Hromads'kyi Holos was published in New York City and covered American and international political events from a communist perspective.

=== Yiddish ===
- Di Naye Welt (The New World) (August 1915 – March 1922) — Official organ of the Jewish Socialist Federation of the Socialist Party of America, edited by the head of the JSF, J.B. Salutsky — later known as "J.B.S. Hardman." Di Naye Welt stood in opposition to the moderate socialist views of the daily Forverts of Abraham Cahan, more so as the JSF moved steadily to the left at the close of the 1910s. From 1919 there was also considerable factional animosity between Salutsky and his Di Naye Welt and Alex Bittelman and his Der Kampf — an ongoing personal and ideological battle which played itself out for the next half decade. In 1922, Di Naye Welt — which had aligned itself with the Workers' Council organization in 1921 and joined forces with the American Communist organization at the time of the formation of the Workers Party of America in the last days of that year — was merged with the Yiddish-language organ of the Jewish Communist Federation, Der Emes, to form Di Naye Welt-Emes.
- Der Kampf (The Struggle) (February 1919 – 1920) — The first Yiddish-language proto-communist group emerged early in 1919 in New York City, calling itself the "Left Wing of the Jewish Socialist Federation." This group published Der Kampf, a weekly newspaper to promote its views as part of the broad left wing movement that swept the Socialist Party of America in that year. The publication declared itself the organ of the independent Yiddish left wing effective with its issue of June 27, 1919, and became the official organ of the Jewish Communist Federation as of its issue of September 19, in the wake of the formal establishment of the Communist Party of America. Editor of the paper was Alexander Bittelman, who was a bitter factional rival of J.B. Salutsky and the mainline Jewish Socialist Federation that was integrated into the Communist Party via the Workers Council organization in 1921. Der Kampf was renamed Funken in 1920.
  - Funken (Sparks) (1920–1921) — Official organ of the Jewish Communist Federation. This weekly was edited in New York City by Alex Bittelman.
  - Der Emes (The Truth) (July 1921 – November 1921) — New York weekly of the Jewish Communist Federation of the Communist Party of America, giving extensive coverage to the international revolutionary movement and the affairs of the Communist International. The paper was merged with Di Naye Welt in April 1922 to form Di Naye Welt-Emes.
  - Di Naye Welt-Emes (The New World-Truth) (April 1922 – December 1922) — This merged publication joined factional antagonists J.B. Salutsky of the Jewish Socialist Federation and the Workers' Council group and his Di Naye Welt with Alexander Bittelman of the Jewish Communist Federation and his Emes. The joined title was a compromise, as the JSF/WC sought to use the name Freiheit while the JCF wished nothing more than to keep the name Emes. There remained two publications after the shotgun wedding, with a new daily Freiheit (edited by M.J. Olgin) being launched at the same time as the ostensible merger. Di Naye Welt-Emes expired at the end of 1922, as did the underground Communist Party of America, with the less doctrinaire Freiheit of the legal Workers Party of America carrying forward.
- The Communist (1921) — According to Official Bulletin No. 2 of the unified Communist Party of America, a Yiddish-language edition of the official organ of the party, The Communist, was "expected" to be provided by the party's Jewish Federation Language Bureau beginning in the second half of 1921.
- Freiheit (Freedom) (April 1922 – 1988) — Yiddish-language daily founded in New York in April 1922 with Moissaye J. Olgin at the editorial helm. The publication was founded with the aid of Comintern funds to compete with the Yiddish-language daily Forverts, which was allied with the rival Socialist Party of America and was deeply hostile to the communist movement. In June 1929 the Freiheit officially changed its name to Morgen Freiheit (Morning Freedom). The paper much later moved to a weekly publication schedule.
- Proletarishe Shtime (Proletarian Voice) (September 1920 – November 1923) — Publication by Yiddish-language speakers of the United Communist Party of America, edited by Noah London and Louis Hendin. The paper was produced on a bimonthly basis.
- Der Proletarier (The Proletarian) (September 1920 – February 1921) — Short-lived publication produced in New York City by the Proletarian Publishing Association containing Yiddish-language translations from the Soviet press.
- Furiers Buletin (Furriers' Bulletin) (1923) — Short-lived Yiddish-language publication of the Trade Union Educational League directed towards workers in the fur trade, published in New York City.
- Der Nodl Arbeter (The Needle Worker) (January 1924 – 1934?) — Yiddish-language monthly organ of the Trade Union Educational League (TUEL) directed towards workers in the garment trade, published in New York City. In January 1929 as part of the ultra-radicalism of the so-called Third Period, the TUEL, which had advanced a strategy of boring from within the existing trade unions, was supplanted by a new organization called the Trade Union Unity League (TUUL), which adopted the policy of revolutionary industrial unionism — attempting to effect change by forming new "dual unions" in opposition to the already existing "conservative" union organizations. As part of this change, the Needle Trades Industrial Union was formed and Der Nodl Arbeter was made the official organ of that new group, organized to compete with the other four unions in the garment trades.
- IKOR (ICOR) (April 1925 – April 1935) — Monthly magazine published by the Association for Jewish Colonization of the Soviet Union, New York City dealing with the project to establish Birobidzhan, a Jewish national homeland within the territory of the Soviet Union. Initially a newsletter, in May 1928 ICOR began to take shape as a full-fledged magazine. The publication was expanded as Naileben effective with the May 1935 issue.
  - Naileben (New Life) (May 1935 – April 1950) — Naileben carried forward ICOR magazine, emphasizing the activities of Soviet Jews in Birobidzhan, publishing Yiddish-language poetry by Soviet writers, and covering the activities of the ICOR branches in America.
  - Di Velt (The World) (May 1950-June 1951?) — Although ostensibly a "non-partisan" journal and although not mentioning ICOR, this monthly magazine published in New York continued the volume numbering and political trend of Naileben. Editor was Rabbi Abraham Bick, former editor of Naileben since March 1944.
- Di Froy (The Woman) (1925-1927?) — Irregular New York publication of the United Council of Working Class Housewives. By 1927 the title was changed to Di Froy in der Heym un in Shop (The Woman at Home and in the Shop). Only a few copies have survived.
- Yunge Kuzne (Young Anvil) (August 1924 – November 1925) — Precursor to Yugnt produced in New York by Alexander Pomerantz and the Proletarian Union of Young Writers. The magazine looked to Soviet Yiddish literature for its inspiration and published Yiddish translations of politically radical literature.
  - Yugnt (Youth) (November 1926 – March 1927) — New York monthly edited by Alexander Pomerantz and six other members of the Proletarian Union of Young Writers. Each issue was 24 large-format pages, illustrated and devoted to Yiddish literature. The principals became involved with the publication of Der Hamer and only four issues of Yugnt appeared before it was terminated in the spring of 1927.
- Der Hamer (The Hammer) (May 1926 – October 1939) — Artistic and literary monthly, akin to The New Masses, edited in New York City by Moissaye Olgin. The publication included fiction and theatre criticism along with the Communist Party's analysis of world events. The complete run of Der Hamer is available on five reels of microfilm through the New York Public Library.
- Der Nodl Treyd Arbeter (The Needle Trades Worker) (1929) — Short-lived Los Angeles publication of the Pacific Coast Joint Council of the Needle Trades Workers Industrial Union, affiliated with the Communist Party's Trade Union Unity League. First issue was dated March 1929.
- Der Kampf (The Struggle) (July 1929) — Short-lived Chicago publication of the "Independent Workman's Circle," forerunner of the International Workers Order. The sole known issue, "Volume 1, Number 1," is dated July 1929.
- Der Funk (The Spark) (1930–1933) — Launched as a monthly in New York as the Yiddish-language organ of the International Workers Order. By the end of its run in 1933 the publication had moved to a bimonthly frequency.
- Di Kinder Shul (The Children's School) (December 1932 – February 1933) — Short-lived publication of the New York Committee for Jewish Children's Schools, produced to encourage members of the International Workers Order to send their children to the Yiddish-language schools operated by the IWO.
- Der Arbeter Klub (The Workers' Club) (1932–1933) — During the 1930s a number of "Workers' Clubs" were established in New York City by Jewish-American communists to fulfill social, cultural, and educational functions. Der Arbeter Klub was intended as a newsletter of club activities. Initial issues were mimeographed, later issues typeset and printed.
  - Funken (Sparks) (October 1933 – 1936) — In the fall of 1933 the Central Executive Committee took over the management of the New York "Workers' Clubs" from the New York City Committee. Associated with this change was a relaunch of the publication of the clubs, with Der Arbeter Klub rebranded as Funken and given a more political and less social bent.
- Signal (Signal) (March 1933 – September 1936) — New York artistic and literary monthly emphasizing proletarian literature and the role of art in the class struggle. Publisher was the Proletarian Writers Society.
- Di Dresmakher Shtime (The Dressmakers' Voice) (January 1934 – February 1935) — Monthly publication of the Communist-led left wing opposition in Local 22 of the International Ladies' Garment Workers' Union (ILGWU). Content dealt exclusively with the factional war taking place in the ILGWU, with union leaders David Dubinsky and Charles S. Zimmerman the particular targets of ire.
- Massen (Masses) (May 1934) — One issue known of this projected bimonthly of radical Yiddish artistic and literary fare. The editor was Pesah Marcus.
- IMAF (IMAF) (1934) — Short-lived monthly magazine produced by the Idisher Muzikalsher Arbeter Farband (IMAF — Yiddish Workers' Music Association) dealing with Jewish proletarian music and singing societies.
- Der Apikoyres (The Freethinker) (1934) — Short-lived anti-religious publication of the Jewish Bureau of the Central Committee of the CPUSA.
- Proletarishe Derziung (Proletarian Education) (January 1935 – December 1938) — Yiddish-language publication of the National School Committee of the International Workers Order, edited by IWO Jewish section head R. Saltzman. An illustrated magazine which featured scholarly articles on education and child psychology.
  - Haim un Derzuing (Home and Education) (January 1939 – May 1944) — Successor to Proletarishe Derziung, also published in New York with R. Saltzman at the helm. Beginning in November 1940 a 1 to 3 page English-language section was added. The journal continued to deal with issues faced by the network of Yiddish-language schools operated under the auspices of the IWO.
- Fur Arbeter Shtime (Fur Workers' Voice) (1937) — Short-lived publication of the "Communist Party Branches in the Fur Trade," perhaps terminated after only one issue, dated "October/November 1937."
- Oyf der Vakh far Sholem un Demokratiye (On Guard for Peace and Democracy) (December 1937 – June 1940) — Monthly organ of the United Cloakmakers' Branch of the American League for Peace and Democracy.
- Yiddishe Kultur (Yiddish Culture) (November 1938-1980s?) — Monthly magazine of the Yiddish Culture Association, founded in 1937 with headquarters in New York City. The magazine's issues were dominated literary work by Soviet Yiddish writers as well as American communists and party sympathizers.
- Nyu Yorker Schriftn (New York Writings) (1939) — Short-lived magazine of Yiddish-language poetry and literary criticism by American and Soviet authors.
- Fraternaler Veg (Fraternal Way) (1939–1941) — Yiddish-language monthly of the International Workers' Order.
- Unzer Ṿorṭ (Our Word) (February 1941 – February 1942) — Publication of the National Council of Jewish Communists. Editor was M. Steinberg. During this interval the National Council of Jewish Communists also published an English-language magazine, Jewish Voice.
- Ainikeit (Unity) (November 1942 – November 1947) — Initially a bi-weekly publication of the American Committee of Jewish Writers, Artists and Scientists, espousing a pro-Soviet political line. The publication appeared sporadically in 1943 and regularly in 1944, moving to a monthly publication cycle in May of that year.e.
- Di Shtime far Eynigkayt (The Voice for Unity) (July–September 1944) — Short-lived illustrated publication produced in New York City for the 6th Convention of the International Workers Order.
- Unzer Ṿorṭ (Our Word) (April 1945 – June 1950) — Monthly organ of the Jewish People's Fraternal Order of the IWO. Editor was R. Saltzman, the head of the Jewish section of the IWO.
- Unzer Lebn (Our Life) (January 1947-???) — Monthly publication produced in New York City by Yiddish-language Branch 15 of the International Workers Order.
- Yiddish America (Yiddish America) (January -December 1949) — Seven issues of this Yiddish-language artistic and literary magazine were produced, with editor Ber Green name-checking four earlier Communist Yiddish literary magazines in the introductory essay. The profusely illustrated issues included poetry, book reviews, literary criticism, and essays.
- Zamlugen (Gatherings) (1954–1978) — Quarterly literary journal of the Yiddish Culture Association, including poetry, fiction, literary criticism, and historical essays, both original material in Yiddish and in translation from other languages. Most writers and editors closely associated with the publication were Communist Party members or sympathizers.

== English-language press for nationality groups ==
=== Jewish-Americans ===
- Jewish Voice (February 1941-January 1942?) — Publication of the National Council of Jewish Communists. Issue 1, dated February 1941, was a tabloid newspaper, succeeding issues were in a small magazine format. Editor at the launch was Max Steinberg and all content was in English. Publication is not listed in OCLC WorldCat but a specimen of the first issue of this projected monthly exists at the Tamiment Library of New York University.
- Jewish Life, New York, NY, was an English-language magazine published monthly by the Morning Freiheit Association. The editorial board included Alex Bittelman, Moses Miller, Paul Novick, Sam Pevzner, and Morris U. Schappes. Managing editor was Samuel Barron.

=== Slavic-Americans ===
- Slav American was the quarterly magazine published in New York City by the American Slav Congress.

== See also ==
- English-language press of the Communist Party USA
- Non-English press of the Socialist Party of America
- Language federation
