= Ernest Klopfstein =

Hungarian-American trade union leader

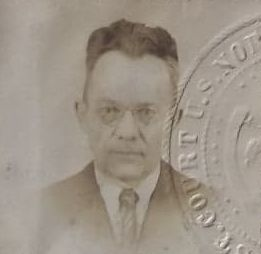
- Declaration of Intention for US citizenship (1938)
- Born: October 4, 1883; Nagykőrös, Austria-Hungary
- Died: April 26, 1952 (aged 68); Chicago, Illinois, United States
- Citizenship: American
- Occupations: trade union leader, newspaper editor, woodcarver
- Organization: Industrial Workers of the World
- Political party: Socialist Labor Party of America (SLP), Communist Party of the United States of America (CPUSA)
- Movement: Hungarian-American labor movement
- Spouse(s): Jozefa Rosenfeld (married 1904-1918), Mary Kiesman (married 1921-1925), Mary Ajtay (1926-1952)

Ernest Klopfstein (Hungarian: Klopfstein Ernő; October 4, 1883 – April 26, 1952) was a Hungarian-born socialist political activist, trade union leader, newspaper editor, and woodcarver. He was a prominent figure of the Hungarian-American labor movement, as well as the editor of the New York-based newspaper called Népakarat and the Chicago-based Világosság.

== Early years ==
Klopfstein was born in Nagykőrös, Austria-Hungary on October 4, 1883, to Julia and Antal Klopfstein. His father was a shoemaker who soon moved the entire family to Újpest, a burgeoning suburb of Budapest at the time. Klopfstein attended I. Számú Polgári Fiúiskola, and eventually took a job as an assistant woodcarver.

== Hungary and the labor movement (1903-1907) ==
He joined the Social Democratic Party of Hungary in his early twenties and married Jozefa Rosenfeld, a Jewish activist who later became the co-founder of the Hungarian feminist movement. From 1903, Klopfstein participated in all major demonstrations in Újpest and soon became treasurer of the local organization. In his speeches, he often discussed increasing social inequalities, soaring unemployment, and the right of all citizens to vote.

Recognizing his talent as a political organizer, Klopfstein was elected as the Secretary of the Social Democratic Party in Szatmárnémeti. He also became the official candidate of the Fehérgyarmat electoral district at the 1906 parliamentary elections. However, local authorities loyal to the conservative government in power made his campaign especially difficult, resulting in his eventual electoral defeat.

Despite the brief political setback, Klopfstein carried on with his movement building efforts among the industrial proletariat. He helped organize the first documented strike of ethnic Roma workers in the history of the Hungarian labor movement. His arrest by the local police sparked a city-wide protest paralyzing public transportation, shutting down grocery stores, and turning off street lights for several days. With his story covered by all major outlets, Klopfstein became a rising star in socialist circles around the country.

== Assassination attempt in Arad (1906-1907) ==
Shortly after the Szatmárnémeti general strike, he was elected as the Party Secretary of Arad, an important cultural and industrial hub of the Austro-Hungarian Empire. Klopfstein was instrumental in helping to establish the local trade unions and organizing walk outs in response to employee grievances. For his involvement in the waiters' strike of December 1906, restaurant owners filed a lawsuit and sent death threats to him. On January 2, 1907, he survived an assassination attempt carried out by unknown perpetrators.

Despite the attack, he did not give up on the organizing work and became even more radical in his rhetoric. In a speech about the attempted murder of Nicholas II. of Russia, he said: "I would appreciate it if someone did something like this in our country". Journalists covering the rally interpreted his words as a call for the assassination of Franz Joseph I, and the story was published by international outlets. As both the Minister of Internal Affairs and the Cabinet Office in Vienna launched an investigation, Klopfstein's case was discussed in the Hungarian Parliament.

At this point, there were more than twenty judicial proceedings underway against him. In the summer of 1907, most likely to avoid the potential prison sentence, he decided to flee Austria-Hungary and immigrate to the United States through Switzerland. Klopfstein's wife later claimed that he had left the country to avoid conscription into the military.

== First years in the United States (1907-1912) ==
Based on the official ship manifest, he arrived to Ellis Island on June 18, 1907, with ten dollars in his pocket. In less than two weeks, however, the chief editor of the Socialist Labor Party of America's Hungarian-language newspaper sent a brief message to Ervin Szabo that all administrative tasks related to Népakarat will be handled by Klopfstein.

While the exact date is unknown, multiple sources suggest that he moved to Chicago, Illinois, sometimes around 1910, where local papers already referred to him as the Secretary of the Socialist Labor Party. Leaving behind the Windy City in just a few months, he relocated to Cleveland, Ohio, and became the editor of Előre, which was briefly merged with Népakarat in 1911. But the unification of the two Hungarian-American socialist movements and their publications proved to be a short-lived project, and the groups split once again in November 1912.

== Joining the Industrial Workers of the World (1913-1924) ==
Following a brief visit to New York City, Klopfstein returned to Chicago in 1915 and joined the largest labor union known as the Industrial Workers of the World (IWW). Withdrawing entirely from party politics, he started to promote the "One Big Union" concept in his public speeches, and contended that all workers should be united as a social class to replace capitalism and wage labor with industrial democracy. In addition to establishing new IWW chapters around Chicago, Klopfstein founded a newspaper called Világosság with Lajos Tarczai in 1916. He also joined the Worker's Mutual Aid and Literary Society and directed a theater play at the Vorwaerts Turner Hall.

In September 1918, he was drafted to the military, just a few months after the United States entered World War I by declaring war on Germany. Klopfstein kept a low profile during the First Red Scare period (1919–1920) and left Chicago once again. He relocated to Los Angeles, California, this time, and married his friend's widow, Mary Kiesman in 1921. Little is known about his life there, but local press covered his speech at the "funeral of a comrade from Santa Monica" in November 1923.

== During the Great Depression (1925-1932) ==
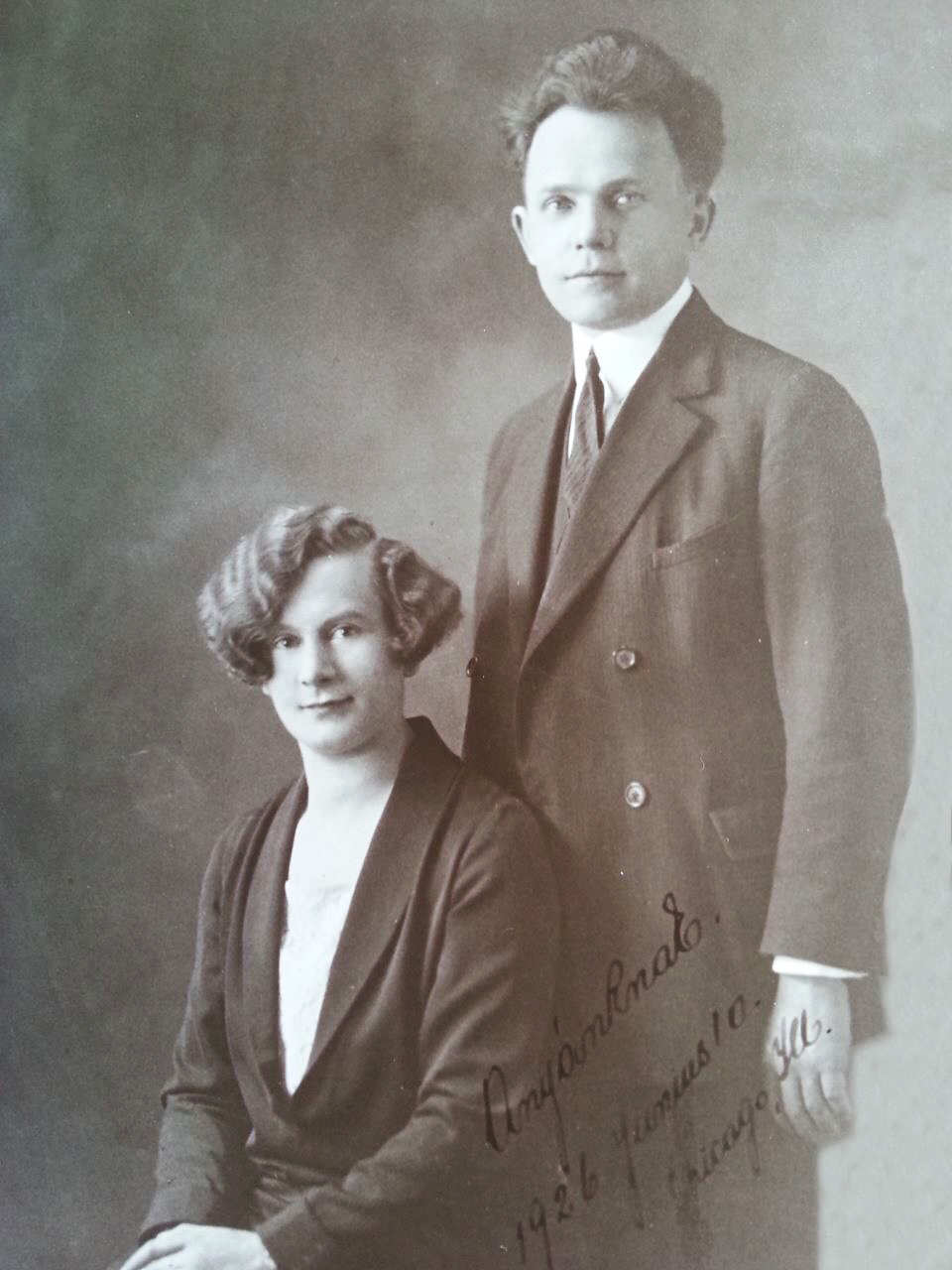
Ernest Klopfstein and Mary Ajtay in 1926

Less than a year later, Klopfstein moved back to Illinois, married his third wife (Mary Ajtay), and obtained intellectual property rights for his industrial design patents. As he became politically active again from the mid-1920s, he helped organizing protests against a Kossuth statue erected by followers of Miklós Horthy, the right-wing authoritarian leader whose foreign policy led Hungary into an alliance with Nazi Germany. Klopfstein co-founded the League Against Horthy and the Council for the Protection of Foreign Born's Chicago chapter. He spent most of his time participating in public debates and roundtable talks at the Hungarian Worker's Club of Chicago.

With the Great depression hitting cities dependent on heavy industry particularly hard, Klopfstein had to relocate to Terre Haute, Indiana, looking for job opportunities. Disillusioned with capitalism and attracted by their opposition to fascism, he joined the Communist Party of the United States of America (CPUSA) at the end of 1930. He became a popular speaker at their rallies and had a key role in organizing workers around Chicago. He also published several articles in Új Előre, around the time when its lead editor, Lajos Beberits was deported by the U.S. Department of Justice. In June 1932, Klopfstein had the opportunity to meet the Soviet delegation visiting the United States.

== Later life and death (1933-1952) ==
Though there is uncertainty around the specific reasons, he was eventually sidelined by the Hungarian-American labor movement due to the combination of personal and political issues in the mid-1930s. After spending more than thirty years in the United States, Ernest Klopfstein became a citizen in April 1938. When the U.S. joined World War II, he was drafted to the military once more in 1942. He died on April 26, 1952, at the age of 68 in Chicago.

== Controversies ==
Ernest Klopfstein was accused of corruption and embezzlement multiple times during his political career both by the conservative press and by rival socialist groups. However, the allegations of financial wrongdoing have never been substantiated by verifiable evidence.

His surname inspired various antisemitic jokes in Hungary during the 1930s.

== Personal life and marriages ==
In 1904, Klopfstein married his first wife, Jozefa Rosenfeld. They had two daughters, Irén Borbála (born in 1905) and Jolán Sarolta (born in 1907). He became widowed after Jozefa died in 1918. He married Mary Kiesman in September 1921. Shortly after their divorce in August 1925, he got married once again. He and his third wife, Mary Ajtay had two children: Margaret Julia (born in 1927) and Erwin (born in 1930).
