= Bérmunkás =

Newspaper in Cleveland, Ohio

- Nameplate of Bérmunkás, Hungarian organ of the IWW
- Type: Bi-weekly; weekly
- Publisher: Industrial Workers of the World
- Launched: November 15, 1912
- Ceased publication: 1953
- Political alignment: Revolutionary industrial unionism
- Language: Hungarian
- City: Chicago; Cleveland
- Country: USA
- Circulation: 1,000 to 6,000

Bérmunkás (The Wage Worker) was a Hungarian language newspaper published in the United States by the radical syndicalist trade union Industrial Workers of the World (IWW). The paper was launched as a bi-weekly in November 1912. During the years of World War I American government repression of the IWW and its press forced the publication to make a series of name changes in an attempt to keep ahead of postal authorities. The original name was restored in 1923 and Bérmunkás continued until its eventual termination in 1953.

== Publication history ==
=== Background ===
Hungarian radicalism in the United States of America dates back to the defeat of the Hungarian Revolution of 1848 and the exile of Governor-President of Hungary Lajos Kossuth. Over the next six decades about 1.7 million people emigrated from the Austro-Hungarian Empire, of whom somewhere between one-third and one-half were Hungarian language-speaking Magyars. A majority of these were peasants, but perhaps one-third of these were industrial workers from Budapest and other cities, many of whom were familiar with the ideas of trade unionism and socialism.

The Hungarian émigrés to America tended to cluster in the industrial cities of the Eastern and Midwestern United States, including New York City, Philadelphia, Cleveland, Pittsburgh, and Chicago. These tended to work at difficult and dangerous physical jobs in heavy industry, mining, meatpacking, and manufacturing. A certain percentage also worked as skilled and semi-skilled workers in lighter industries such as carpentry, woodworking, and printing.

Although at least four Hungarian-speaking local unions affiliated with the American Federation of Labor (AF of L) emerged in the early 20th century, most Hungarian workers were unrepresented by the AF of L and its member unions owing to the unskilled nature of their jobs. Some effort was made to organize these workers politically through the Socialist Party of America and the socialist magazine Előre, but it was not until the aftermath of the strike wave of 1909-1911 that serious efforts would be made to coordinate the activities of Hungarian workers through the radical syndicalist union, Industrial Workers of the World (IWW).

=== Establishment ===
The IWW launched Bérmunkás (The Wage Worker), a newspaper in the Hungarian-language targeted to the largely unskilled Hungarian-American working class, in the fall of 1912, with the first issue dated November 15 of that year. The paper was launched by a board of editors, most of whom were first exposed to the ideas of revolutionary industrial unionism in Hungary. Issued as a bi-weekly in its initial incarnation, Bérmunkás published news of the strike movement and details of the affairs of the Hungarian-language branches of the IWW.

The publication came to be affiliated with the Federated Press and the Defense News Service in later years.

=== Wartime repression ===
With the coming of American entry into World War I in the spring of 1917, repression against political dissidents and the radical labor movement became severe, with Postmaster General Albert Burleson removing the right to send opposition newspapers inexpensively via second class mail. Bérmunkás was one of the first two IWW newspapers to lose its mailing privileges, along with the Italian language paper Il Proletario. There was also an effort to decapitate the radical Hungarian labor movement through the jailing of its leaders, including Bérmunkás editor Károly Rotfischer, who was sentenced to 20 years in prison as a result of a prosecution set in motion by the United States Department of Justice.

In an effort to keep the Hungarian IWW press alive and in the mails, a series of name changes followed, with Bérmunkás relaunched as Ipari Munkás (Industrial Worker) in 1917, Küzdelem (The Struggle) in 1918, and Felszabádulás (Liberation) in 1919. It was not until 1923 and the release of the wartime IWW prisoners that the political situation had calmed down sufficiently for the original name of the publication, Bérmunkás, to be restored.

=== Circulation ===
The circulation of Bérmunkás at the time of its launch was approximately 1,500, and it is believed that the publication maintained a more or less steady circulation at this level until the advent of World War I. A peak circulation of 6,000 copies per week was claimed by the paper in 1925. In subsequent years the paper's readership atrophied, in tandem with the declining membership of the IWW and the declining number of Hungarian-born workers in the United States, with scholar Julianna Puskás estimating a circulation of approximately 1,000 during the newspapers declining years.

=== Later years and termination ===
Following the restoration of the original name of the paper in 1923, the financing and publication of Bérmunkás was aided by an organization known as the Munkás Betegsegélyző Szövetség (Workingmen's Association). The publication paid increasing attention to the history of the IWW and the publication of scientific and technical information for its readers during its final decades.

With its circulation falling Bérmunkás lost critical mass and was terminated by the IWW in 1953.

== See also ==
- Előre
- Új Előre
- Non-English press of the Socialist Party of America
- Non-English press of the Communist Party USA
