= Tiesa (disambiguation) =

Tiesa was the official daily newspaper in the Lithuanian SSR from 1917 to 1994.

Tiesa may also refer to:

- Tiesa (New York), a newspaper published in 1930–2006 in New York, United States
- Kauno Tiesa, former name of Kauno diena, a Lithuanian daily newspaper printed in Kaunas
