= Dziennik Ludowy (People's Daily) =

Polish-language Chicago newspaper

Dziennik Ludowy (People's Daily) (1907-1925) was a Polish-language socialist daily newspaper published in Chicago. Established by a young generation of immigrant activists, it presented left-wing beliefs, and its chief editors were M. Sokołowski and H. Anielewski.

== Role of Polish-language press in immigrant community ==
The press, along with the Roman Catholic Church and political organizations, was a form of leadership in the Polish immigrant community. In the beginning, the press created fewer leaders than the Church and other organizations, was concerned mainly with the political situation in Poland, and paid little attention to organizing immigrants' life in the U.S. There were several newspapers in each settlement town, and they often represented contradicting views, which made it difficult to co-ordinate a community.

The Polish-American press was used as a tool to develop patriotism among former peasants. It played a major role in changing a peasant into an urban citizen. Many of the papers were targeting peasants and, after a while, working-class immigrants settled in urban areas of the U.S. The first Polish-language newspaper, Echo z Polski, appeared in 1863 and closed two years later. There is no information about any other publications in the U.S. for 15 years. The next Polish periodicals appeared in the early 1870s. In the 1880s, Polish press entered a phase of rapid development because of the growing immigrant population in the U.S.. The first dailies appeared in the late 1880s. The three main centers of the Polish community and press were in big cities: Chicago, Milwaukee, and New York.

== History ==
The first issue of Dziennik Ludowy was published in 1907 by Polish immigrants to the U.S. In its first months, the newspaper supported the Polish nationalist movement organized during World War I. One of the most popular Polish-language newspapers, it supported the leader of the country, Józef Piłsudski.

After a split in the Polish- American socialist movement in 1908, the Polish Section of the Socialist Party was formed, and Dziennik Ludowy became the official organ of the Polish Socialist Alliance. It rejected the notion of military activity as a method of establishing an independent Poland proposed by Pilsudski. Instead, the newspaper focused on opening its columns to various Polish organizations, unions, and societies. Dziennik Ludowy supported the idea of establishing an independent Poland by promoting popular education and labor activism as ways of liberating the nation.

The target audience of the newspaper was first-generation immigrants, who did not speak English and so strongly relied on Polish-language news. By 1925, when the daily stopped being published, the younger generation of Polish Americans was often educated in American schools and more accustomed to the American culture. Gradual Americanization often caused younger people to choose English-language newspapers, which contributed to its decreasing readership. The last issue was published on April 20, 1925, when it declared bankruptcy and was superseded by other Chicago-based titles.

== Ideology ==
Dziennik Ludowy was an example of non-English press of the Socialist Party of America. The newspaper provided national and international news and focused particularly on labor movements. It was concerned with issues of class struggle and informed on working-class conditions and ongoing strikes. It concentrated on various ethnic groups of workers, not only Poles. The newspaper editors believed that the class struggle was the most important problem and that religion or ethnicity could divide and impede the working-class movement. The newspaper enhanced solidarity within the working class from various ethnic backgrounds.

Most Polish immigrants were peasants coming from underdeveloped rural areas. After arriving to the U.S., they stayed in urban regions and tended to work in fabrics and manufactures. Their identity slowly changed from peasants to a working-class. A Polish immigrant worker identified himself, basing on his economic status, as a member of a larger labor movement that had people of various ethnicities.

Dziennik Ludowy became a platform for working-class men of different origins. The newspaper also supported the Socialist Party of America, as its goal was to unite all workers and provide them with more social power. The daily was a platform that allowed organizing strikes, movement, and celebrations of a working-class immigrant in Chicago.

One of the biggest meetings was organized on May 21, 1907, on Labor Day, when workers celebrated the labor holiday. Dziennik Ludowy allowed the organizers to reach the interested readers and to spread the news among the working-class people. The editors of the daily saw the education as an important tool for creating a stronger immigrant community. Educating children was desirable and seen as the best method of increasing skills and employability in the future. The newspaper promoted gaining proficiency in English and achieving marketable skills as the most successful path to the advancement of peasant and working-class immigrants. As other publications of thebtime, Dziennik Ludowy co-operated with other educational organizations like parochial and ethnic schools or libraries.

== Relation to other Polish-language press ==
Dziennik Ludowy was one of the five major Polish-language newspapers in Chicago in the first half of 20th century. All of them tried to integrate Polish immigrants in the city, but they promoted a different political view. They were divided over the issues of ideology, organizing of immigrants, and the role of Catholic Church.

Dziennik Ludowy, unlike the other, was not associated with the institution of Church and its audience was not limited to Poles. The newspaper was recognized as an aspect of cultural and educational activities organized by Polish socialist and national movements. Some of the other influential dailies that were being published over the same time period in Chicago were Dziennik Narodowy and Dziennik Zgoda.
