= Előre =

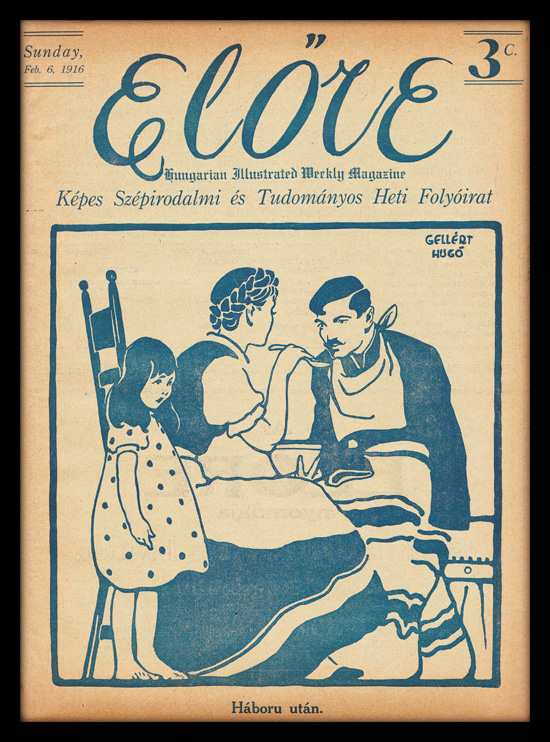
Cover of the February 6, 1916 issue of Előre, featuring anti-militarist art by Hungarian-born artist Hugo Gellert.

Előre (Hungarian pronunciation: [ˈɛløːrɛ], Forward) was a Hungarian-language socialist magazine published in the United States by activists of the Hungarian Socialist Federation of the Socialist Party of America. Launched in September 1905, Előre was published for 16 years before going bankrupt in October 1921. The discontinued publication was immediately succeeded by a new Hungarian-language communist periodical called Új Előre (New Forward).

== Publication history ==
=== Hungarian emigration to the United States ===
Substantial emigration from Hungary to the United States of America dates from the decade of the 1880s, during which more than 25,000 people left the Kingdom of Hungary for the new world. This wave of emigration accelerated in succeeding decades, with more than 55,000 leaving for America in the decade of the 1890s and more than 311,000 in the first decade of the 20th century. Emigration from Hungary to America peaked in 1907, declining precipitously from the 1920s.

A substantial majority of those leaving the Kingdom of Hungary were members of ethnic minority groups, including Slovaks, Germans, and Jews. In the estimate of one leading scholar, ethnic Hungarians comprised only about one-third of those emigrating from Hungary to the United States during the 19th and first decades of the 20th century.

Those emigrating to America from the Kingdom of Hungary were predominantly rural, with about three-quarters of those arriving before World War I coming from agricultural towns and villages. Of these, about half were largely unskilled and impoverished agricultural laborers. Those leaving were driven by unemployment and the low standard of living in rural Hungary — a situation exacerbated by the kingdom's extremely unequal system of land distribution. Only about 20% of emigrants to America in this period can be accurately characterized as members of the urban working class, to which the international socialist movement made its most explicit ideological appeal.

Despite the poor and rural social composition of the émigré Hungarian community in America, certain socialist influence had made itself felt. The Marxist movement in Hungary had emerged in 1880 with the formation of the General Workers' Party of Hungary (Magyarországi Altalános Munkáspárt), a group which renamed itself the Hungarian Social Democratic Party (Magyarországi Szociáldemokrata Párt) in 1890. This organization was particularly strong in the Hungarian trade union movement and that connection of organized politics with organized labor was echoed in the activities of the Hungarian colony on American soil as former peasants became semi-skilled and skilled industrial workers.

=== Establishment ===
Socialist Hungarian émigrés first began to engage in organized radical politics in America during the decade of the 1890s. Initial activity was concentrated in the leading American Marxist political party of the day, the Socialist Labor Party of America (SLP), which established a Hungarian language section in New York City in 1892. This activity was paralleled by the formation of a number of Hungarian-American fraternal-benefit organizations, including five national Sickness Benefit and Workers' Aid groups. One of these, the Workers Benefit and Educational Association, launched a newspaper called Népakarat (People's Will) in 1903 and began to take an active role in party politics.

The Hungarian-American socialists split into two camps in 1904, with one part continuing to support the SLP while others gave their allegiance to the upstart Socialist Party of America (SPA), which was established in the summer of 1901. The majority group who remained loyal to the more orthodox and Marxist SLP, formed a new Sickness Benefit association of their own called the Socialist Hungarian Workers Federation, while retaining control of Népakarat. Those minority members giving allegiance to the rival SPA remained with the already existing Workers Benefit and Educational Association and launched a new newspaper called Előre (Forward) in September 1905.

=== Development ===
Előre was briefly merged with Népakarat in 1911 under the name of the older publication. This unification of the Hungarian-American socialist movement proved short-lived, however, and the two groups split once more in November 1912, with Előre once again emerging as a separate publication.

The circulation of Előre at the time of its 1912 reemergence was approximately 10,000.

In 1915 Előre came under direct control of the Hungarian Socialist Federation of the Socialist Party. The publication took a staunchly anti-militarist position towards the European world war, continuing its opposition even after American entry into the conflict in the spring of 1917. This opposition to the American war effort brought the paper into conflict with Postmaster General Albert S. Burleson and the administration of President Woodrow Wilson, and mail distribution to subscribers was hampered and its editors subjected to police pressure.

=== Dissolution ===
In 1919 the Socialist Party of America was split into radical and moderate wings. The Hungarian Socialist Federation gave its organizational support to the dissident Left Wing Section of the Socialist Party and was suspended from the SPA along with half a dozen other language federations of the party by the governing National Executive Committee in June. Supporters of the new Communist Party of America gained a dominant position on Előre's editorial board, but financial connections were disrupted in the process.

In October 1921 the entity formally publishing Előre, known as the Elore Publishing Corporation, declared itself financially insolvent and the publication was terminated. This lapse proved brief, however, as within a month a new explicitly communist Hungarian language publication was launched, called Új Előre. This successor publication would continue publication without interruption until its eventual termination in 1937.

== See also ==
- Új Előre
- Bérmunkás
- Non-English press of the Socialist Party of America
- Non-English press of the Communist Party USA
