= Tiesa (New York) =

- Frequency: Biweekly (1930–1955); Monthly (1955–2006)
- Circulation: 3,000 in 1977; 630+ in 2003
- First issue: 1930
- Final issue: 2006
- Company: Association of Lithuanian Workers
- Country: United States
- Based in: New York
- Language: Lithuanian
- ISSN: 0040-7372
- OCLC: 480177365

Tiesa (truth) was a Lithuanian-language newspaper published by the Association of Lithuanian Workers (Lithuanian: Lietuvių darbininkų susivienijimas), a fraternal benefit society, from 1930 to 2006 when the association merged into the Supreme Council of the Royal Arcanum. The full collection of Tiesa issues is preserved at the Tamiment Library and Robert F. Wagner Archives in microfilm format.

== History ==
The Association of Lithuanian Workers was established in June 1930 as a communist-leaning splinter of the Lithuanian Alliance of America. The new society established its own publication, Tiesa, which was distributed to association's members free of charge. The association was based in Brooklyn, then Ozone Park, and since 1982 in Middletown, New York.

== Content ==
Initially, Tiesa was published twice a month, but in 1955 it switched to a monthly schedule. The last issues of Tiesa were published in newsletter format. The publication reported on activities of the association (board resolutions, financial reports, results of association's athletic teams, etc.), published bits of Lithuanian culture (poetry, songs, recipes, language lessons), and offered advice (health, finances, travel). Early issues also included general news of United States, Lithuania, and the world. As of 2003, advertising was not accepted.

== Editors ==
The editors of Tiesa were:

- Rojus Miraza (1930–1937), who went on to become editor of Laisvė
- Jonas Gasiūnas (1937–1950)
- Jonas Siurba (1950–1983)
- Emilija Juškevičienė (1983–?)
