= Új Előre =

Új Előre (New Forward) was a Hungarian language communist newspaper published in New York City. Új Előre was founded as a continuation of the Hungarian socialist newspaper Előre, which had been founded in 1905.

The publication was edited by a board of editors, with Hungarian communist leader Lajos Bebrits assuming the position of lead editorialist until his deportation at the behest of the U.S. Department of Justice in 1932.

As of 1925 Új Előre had a circulation of around 15,000. It was the sole Hungarian-language communist daily newspaper in the world at the time.

In 1937, Új Előre was discontinued in favor of a less doctrinaire daily newspaper called Amerikai Magyar Világ (Hungarian World in America). This newspaper, also published in New York City, made use of the slogan "Peace, progress, and people's rights" and attempted to build a broad anti-fascist coalition among Hungarian-speaking Americans in line with the Popular Front policy established by the Communist International. This daily publication proved to be financially unstable, however, and the daily was terminated in December 1938 to be replaced by the weekly, Magyar Jövő (Hungarian Future), which continued until 1952 until being replaced by another publication.

== See also ==
- Előre
- Bérmunkás
- Non-English press of the Socialist Party of America
- Non-English press of the Communist Party USA
