= Non-English press of the Socialist Party of America =

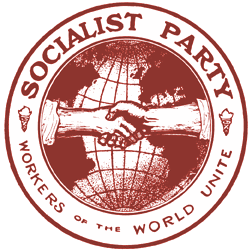
Logo of the Socialist Party of America, established August 1901.

For a number of decades after its establishment in August 1901, the Socialist Party of America produced or inspired a vast array of newspapers and magazines in a variety of different languages. This list of the non-English press of the Socialist Party of America provides basic information on each title, along with links to pages dealing with specific publications in greater depth.

== Non-English press ==
=== Czech ===
- Obrana (Defense) (November 1910 – 1938) — Czech language weekly newspaper launched in New York City by the Czech Socialist Section of the Central Labor Union. The publication moved to the left after the 1917 Russian Revolution and sided with the Left Wing Section of the Socialist Party during the factional war of 1919 which resulted in the formation of the American communist movement. The paper was produced in the interim by the "Independent Czechoslovak Marxist Federation," with this group later joining the Communist Party. In 1924 Obrana proclaimed itself the official publication of the Czechoslovak Section of the Workers Party of America. Circulation as of that date was approximately 4,000 copies. The paper moved from weekly to daily status in 1934. Publication was terminated in 1938.

=== Estonian ===
- Uus Ilm (New World) (January 1909 – 1980s?) — The Estonian language Uus Ilm, one of the longest-running radical publications in the United States, was launched as a weekly in New York City by the Central Committee of the American-Estonian Socialist Association. The paper moved to the left after the 1917 Russian Revolution and was the organ of Estonian-speaking communists in America from the 1920s.

=== Finnish ===
- Amerikan Työmies (The American Worker) (1900) — While antedating the establishment of the Socialist Party of America, Amerikan Työmies was thoroughly social democratic in character and an important forerunner of the Finnish-American socialist press. The 4-page paper was launched in New York City by A.F. Tanner in January 1900 and at least 24 weekly issues were produced, some of which have survived.
- Ampiainen (The Wasp) (1900) — Early Finnish-American political humor publication, probably edited by A.F. Tanner in New York and issued in conjunction with his Amerikan Työmies. No copies are known to have survived.
- Päivälehti (The Daily Journal) (1901-October 1948; Socialist: 1940–1948) — This daily Duluth, Minnesota newspaper was apolitical throughout its early existence. In 1940 it was purchased by the Raivaaja Publishing Company and thereby brought into the socialist camp, although the paper was not particularly ideological in its orientation even after its purchase.
- Vapauttaja (The Liberator) (1903) — Vapauttaja was a 4-page socialist political supplement to the non-socialist newspaper called Lännetar, published in Portland, Oregon. The paper was edited by pioneer Finnish-American socialist Martin Hendrickson, and a total of four issues are believed to have been produced, only one of which, dated February 1903, survives.
- Uusi Meikäläinen (The New Fellow-Countryman) (April 1903?-1909) — Finnish-language political humor magazine published in Fitchburg, Massachusetts, which included political cartoons, jokes, and short stories. In the summer of 1903 the publication was moved to Worcester, Massachusetts, where it seems to have had some sort of connection with the establishment of the straight newspaper Amerikan Suomalainen Työmies (better known by its subsequent name, Työmies). The publication subsequently moved to the neighboring town of Quincy, Massachusetts, where it seems to have expired in 1909 or shortly thereafter.
- Aatteita (Ideals) (1903) — Short-lived bimonthly Finnish language newspaper founded by pioneer Finnish-American socialist A.F. Tanner. Three issues of the paper were produced in Ely, Minnesota, but no surviving copies have come to light.
- Suomalainen (The Finn) (1903) — Short-lived independent socialist weekly issued during the summer of 1903 in Ely, Minnesota, by Toivo Hiltunen. A few examples of the publication have survived.
- Amerikan Suomalainen Työmies (The Finnish-American Worker) (July 1903 – June 1904) — The granddaddy of the Finnish-American radical press was Työmies, established in Worcester, Massachusetts, in 1903 as Amerikan Suomalainen Työmies. The publication was a weekly and was only in Massachusetts for about a year before heading west to Michigan.
  - Työmies (The Worker) (July 1904-August 1950; Socialist: 1904 – about 1920) — In June 1904 the publication was moved to the small town of Hancock, located in the sparsely populated Upper Peninsula of Michigan. The paper remained in that location for a decade before moving to the comparative metropolis of Superior, Wisconsin, a virtual twin city of Duluth, Minnesota. From its earliest days, Työmies was a Marxist publication, significantly more radical than its East Coast counterpart established in January 1905, Raivaaja (The Pioneer). The paper briefly published an English-language paper called Wage Slave, and was the source of a number of annual magazines in the Finnish language. In 1950 the paper was consolidated with the CPUSA's East Coast Finnish-language newspaper, Eteenpäin, to form Työmies-Eteenpäin.
- Raivaaja (The Pioneer) (January 1905-April 2010?) — Raivaaja, based in Fitchburg, Massachusetts, was ultimately the daily flagship of a Finnish-language publishing operation which rivaled that of Työmies — one which stayed loyal to the Socialist Party of America during the factional war which swept the Finnish Socialist Federation in 1920–1921. The paper began as a weekly in January 1905, edited by Taavi Tainio under the auspices of the Finnish Socialist Publishing Company, renamed the Raivaaja Publishing Company in 1929. During the decade of the 1910s, the Finnish Socialist Federation split into three geographic districts, with Raivaaja the official organ for the east, Työmies in the middle district, and Toveri in the west. Raivaaja was a radical publication in its early years, but the paper moved gradually to a moderate social democratic position over time, coming down firmly in the Socialist Party camp during the 1920s factional controversy. The paper launched with a circulation of about 2,000, hit its stride in the 1910s with a circulation in excess of 8,000, and peaked with a circulation of 10,000 in 1927 before beginning a long downward slide. As was the case with the publishing company of Työmies, the Raivaaja operation produced an array of annual publications, such as an annual yearbook-and-calendar, and auxiliary publications, such as the monthly Säkeniä/Nykyaika. The list of editors of the publication over the years included such major names as Frans Josef Syrjälä, Yrjö Makelä, Eemeli Parras, Santeri Nuorteva, Oskari Tokoi, and Yrjö Halonen. The publication continued in continuous publication for over 100 years, making it one of the longest-running publications in the history of the American radical press, with the paper finally going down in 2010 for budgetary reasons.

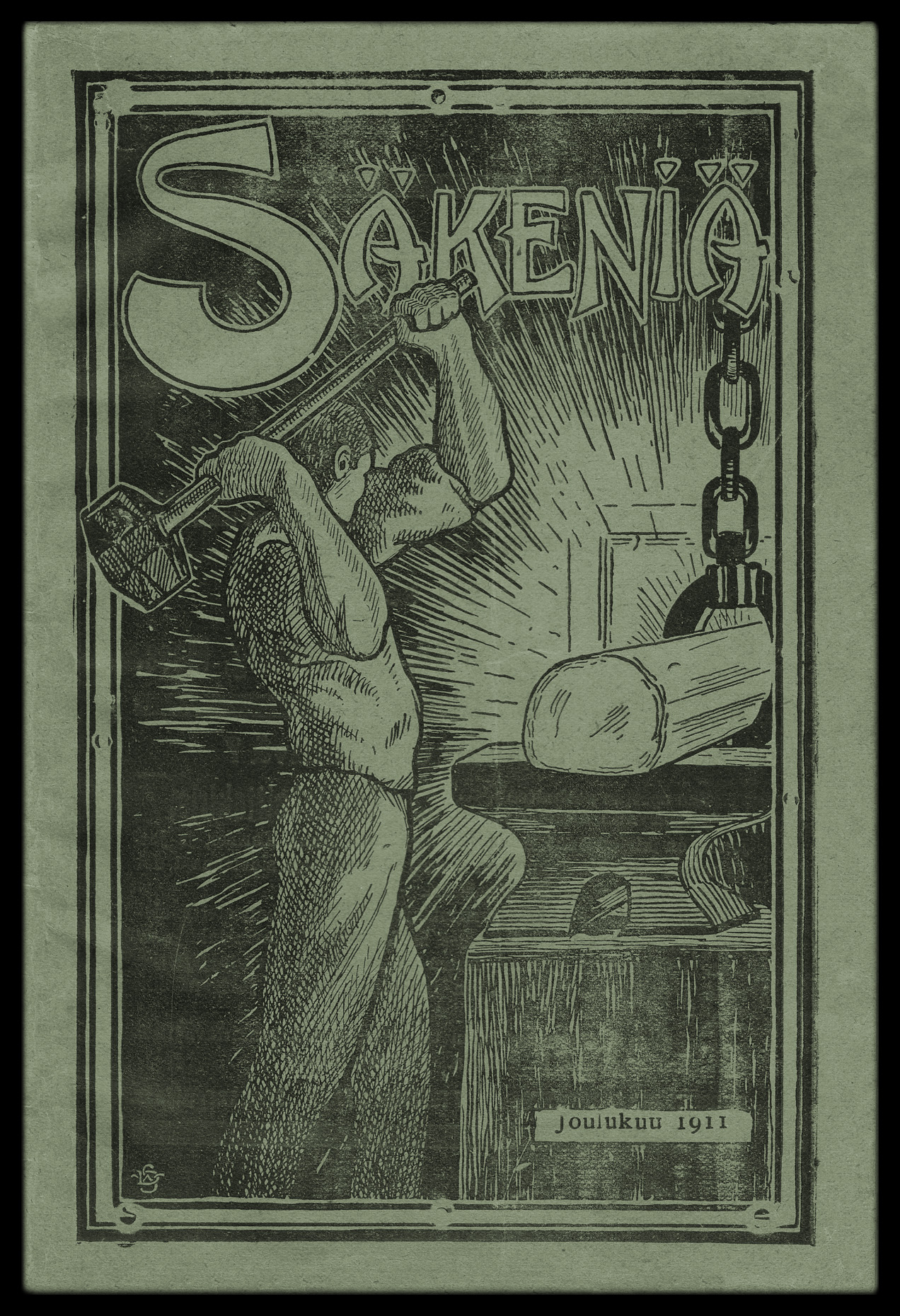
The magazine Säkeniä (Sparks) was a key publication of the Finnish-American socialist movement, peaking with a circulation of 11,000 at the time of its discontinuation in 1921.

- Soihtu (The Torch) (July 1905 – December 1906) — This monthly 32-page magazine of the Finnish Socialist Federation, produced in Hancock, Michigan, by the publishers of Työmies. Content was serious and theoretical in tone, with coverage of contemporary issues through the socialist prism. A complete run of the magazine is held by the University of Helsinki in Finland, with other partial runs in Finnish institutions. Soihtu was succeeded without interruption by the monthly magazine Säkeniä, produced in Massachusetts by the publishers of Raivaaja.
  - Säkeniä (Sparks) (January 1907 – April 1921) — Säkeniä was a monthly slick-paper literary, artistic, and theoretical magazine produced in Fitchburg, Massachusetts, by the publishers of Raivaaja. The publication launched with a print run of 2,000 copies and gained a substantial readership, peaking with a circulation of 11,000 at the time of its discontinuation in 1921. Among the magazine's editors over the years were future Communist Party leaders Santeri Nuorteva and Yrjö Halonen and the publication featured contributions from an array of prominent Finnish and Finnish-American radicals, including Eemeli Parras, A.B. Mäkelä, and Yrjö Sirola. Due to the durability of the materials with which it was produced and the sale of bound volumes by the publisher, this illustrated monthly is substantially preserved in hardcopy — although no single library holds a complete run, nor is microfilm readily available.
  - Nykyaika (The Modern Age) (May 1921 – February 1937) — With a factional battle between left and right sweeping the Finnish Socialist Federation in 1921, Säkeniä was terminated and the clearly social democratic Nykyaika launched in its place. The latter continued to be published by the publishers of Raivaaja and essentially represented a continuation of Säkeniä under a different name. Editors included the former editor of Säkeniä, Moses Hahl, succeeded in turn by two prominent leaders of the Finnish-American socialist movement, William Reivo and Oskari Tokoi. Nykyaika had a circulation of 5,000 in 1923, declining to just 3,000 in 1927, and largely as a result of its declining availability has not been perfectly preserved.
- Velosuu (The Loose Mouth) (c. 1905) — Short-lived Finnish-language political humor weekly published in Hibbing, Minnesota, by well-known socialist editor Moses Hahl. No specimens are known to have survived.
- Toveri (The Comrade) (December 1907-February 1931; Socialist: 1907 – about 1921) — Toveri hailed from the isolated coastal town of Astoria, Oregon, one of two major radical publications produced there by the tightly knit community of "Red Finns" there. The decision of the Finnish Socialist Federation to divide the itself into three districts gave impetus to Finnish-American socialists to launch a newspaper of their own to serve as the voice of the Federation's Western District. In June 1907 a referendum of the Finnish Socialist locals of the West decided to establish a paper for the district and a temporary board of directors was established in Astoria. The venture was capitalized in July through the offer of $5,000 worth of stock at $10 a share. When half of this amount was sold by October, the new holding company, the Western Workmen's Co-operative Publishing Company, was cleared to begin operations. The first issue of the new paper, named Toveri ("The Comrade") appeared on December 7, 1907, under the editorship of Aku Rissanen, formerly on the editorial staff of the Massachusetts Finnish-language socialist newspaper, Raivaaja. Although planned as a bi-weekly, the paper was impacted by an emerging economic crisis and appeared only irregularly during its first year. The paper moved to daily status in 1912. In 1920, the paper's editorial line moved from the Socialist Party camp to a position favoring revolutionary socialism, and the paper soon evolved into a Communist Party organ, which it followed up to its demise. Toveri generally consisted of six pages and included sections for farmers and women, as well as material in English, and it was supported by local advertisers. The printing presses of Toveri were shipped to Soviet Karelia following the paper's closure in 1931.
- Amerikan Matti (The American Matthew) (April 1909?-September 1917) — This radical Finnish-American humor magazine attempted to score political points with a selection of political cartoons (by Henry Askeli and others), short stories, poetry, and straight news from Finland. The publication was part of the Työmies stable, launching in Hancock, Michigan, and making its way to Superior, Wisconsin. The editor of the publication was listed under the pseudonym "Pipokiven Aisakki." The title of the publication seems to have been derived from an English-language motto of uncertain origin: "Here is Matthew, who will not have a sad day..." Subsequent publications in the same vein from Työmies included Lapatossu (The Shoe Pack), Punikki (The Red), and Kansan Huumori (People's Humor), the latter two published under Communist Party auspices.
- Peltomies (The Tiller of the Soil) (1910) — This monthly was only briefly issued in Astoria, Oregon, by William Marttila, a prominent leader of the Finnish-American cooperative movement. The paper was issued for just a few months before being terminated for lack of funds. No specimens are known to have survived.
- Lapatossu (The Shoepack) (1911 – April 1921) — Perhaps the best known of the Finnish-language radical humor publications, Lapatossu was launched in the fall of 1911 in Hancock, Michigan, by Työmies Publishing Co. Initially part of the Socialist Party of America's political orbit, the publication gradually radicalized to a communist position along with the bulk of the Finnish Socialist Federation. The magazine appeared twice a month, usually 12 pages in size, and featured the art of T.K. Sallinen and K.A. Suvanto — the latter being the publication's first editor in 1911 and returning to edit the magazine from 1916 to its termination in 1921.
- Toveritar (The Woman Comrade) (July 1911-September 1930; Socialist: 1911 – about 1921) — In 1911 the Western District convention of the Finnish Socialist Federation reversed its previous policy and urged its locals to form special women's committees and branches for their female members, with a view to increasing the party's influence among women, who were beginning to gain the right to vote throughout the West. In Astoria this took the form of the establishment of a sewing club, designed for both social and fundraising purposes, and the foundation of a special weekly newspaper for socialist women, Toveritar ("The Woman Comrade"). Toveritar was launched as a weekly in July 1911 and it continued as such until 1930, when the publication was terminated. In addition to news of the socialist movement, Toveritar included household hints, a section dedicated to the youth movement, poetry, and serialized literature (both original work and material in translation). This broad array of content proved to be very successful in attracting readers even from outside the organized radical political movement, as there were few other Finnish-language American publications targeted to women. The paper was terminated at the end of September 1930 in favor of a new communist women's publication launched under the auspices of Työmies.
- Pelto Ja Koti (Farm and Home) (1912–1921) — Radical cooperative-oriented publication produced by the Työmies Publishing Co., launched as a monthly in Hancock, Michigan, and moved to Superior, Wisconsin, with the rest of the Työmies operation in 1914. In 1919 the paper moved to a weekly publication cycle and circulation peaked at around 13,000 in the following year. The publication included a good deal of coverage to practical agricultural matters and was not strongly ideological in its presentation.
- Sosialisti (The Socialist) (June 1914 – December 1916) — This radical daily was a product of the 1914 factional war within the Finnish Socialist Federation between the mainline Socialist Party regulars surrounding the daily newspaper Työmies and a dissident syndicalist left wing around Work People's College in Minnesota. The anti-political action and pro-Industrial Workers of the World left wing gained strength from 1912 onward, leading to an attempt by the radicals to gain control of Työmies, the official organ of the central district of the Finnish Socialist Federation. Stock in Työmies was held by various Finnish Socialist Party branches, which one after another began lining up with the radical wing, leading the editors of Työmies to believe that a capture by Leo Laukki and his allies was imminent. As a precautionary measure, in the spring of 1914 the incumbent managers of Työmies diluted the company's stock with a new issue of 2,000 shares, which was sold to the politically trustworthy East coast daily Raivaaja for a $20,000 promisory note. This stock was then distributed to "regular" Finnish branches for voting purposes. This scheme ensured the continued possession of Työmies by moderate forces and enraged the revolutionary socialist left wing, which departed the Finnish Federation en masse. The left wing launched Socialisti in Duluth, Minnesota, as a competing Midwestern Finnish-language socialist daily. Recrimination and expulsions followed, with 35 left wing locals with a membership of nearly 3,500 exiting the Finnish Federation in 1914, leaving the Federation a membership of 8,859 members early in 1915. Sosialisti was edited by Axel Öhrn, with IWW leader Leo Laukki taking over in 1915. In March 1917, the by-then defunct Sosialisti was succeeded by another IWW newspaper edited in Duluth by Leo Laukki, a daily called Industrialisti — a publication which continued on a weekly basis until 1975." Työmies itself moved to the left by the end of the decade and became a bulwark of the American communist movement.
- Lauantaiposti (The Saturday Post) (October 1917 – 1918) — Short-lived 4-page weekly published in Calumet, Michigan. The paper published general news and articles on topics of local concern."
- Kansan Lehti (The People's News) (1928–1934) — Mild "liberal-social democratic" weekly first launched in Cleveland, Ohio, before being moved to Ashtabula in 1931. Few issues of the paper have survived.
- Keskusosuuskunan Tiedonanantaja (The Central Co-operative Exchange Messenger) (December 1929) — Short-lived socialist factional weekly published in December 1929 when the Central Co-operative Exchange came under attack from the Communist Party. A total of four issues were produced under this title.
  - Työvaen Osuustoimintalehti (The Workers' Cooperative Journal) (January 1930 – March 1965) — Long-running socialist cooperative weekly published in Superior, Wisconsin, continuing the work of the Keskusosuuskunan Tiedonanantaja. Primarily a cooperative paper rather than a socialist ideological paper, per se, Työvaen Osuustoimintalehti was nevertheless a product of the factional battle that percolated throughout the Finnish-American radical movement in the 1920s and 1930s. The paper included local news, a women's section, and a youth section written in English. The paper has been preserved in full and is available on microfilm.

=== German ===
- New Yorker Volkszeitung (New York People's News) (January 1878-October 1932; Communist-line 1919–1925) — Independently owned German-language left wing daily published in New York City. The Volkszeitung began as a publication owing allegiance to the fledgling Socialist Labor Party of America and was a major player in the party splits of 1889 and 1899. In the latter conflict, the dissident faction backed by the Volkszeitung, headed by Henry Slobodin and Morris Hillquit, was defeated by loyalists to party editor Daniel DeLeon, and the Volkszeitung thus followed the group's circuitous path into the Socialist Party of America (SPA) in 1901. For nearly two decades, the Volkszeitung remained loyal to the SPA, until the 1919 party split of that organization, which led to the establishment of the American Communist parties. Volkszeitung editor-in-chief Ludwig Lore was a founding member of the Communist Labor Party of America in 1919 and continued in the highest councils of the party until being expelled in 1925 for "Loreism," proclaimed by Lore's enemies during the bitter factional war which swept the Communist Party in this period to be an indigenous form of Trotskyism. Despite his expulsion, Lore remained at the helm of the Volkszeitung, charting an independent radical course for the paper until his departure in 1931. In 1931 the paper was reorganized with a new editor and it formally endorsed the Socialist Party of America once again. The paper was terminated in the fall of 1932 due to financial difficulties.

=== Greek ===
- He Phone tou Ergatou (The Voice of the Worker) (1918–1923) — New York weekly published by the Greek Socialist Union in America. The paper became the organ of the Greek Section of the Workers Party of America in February 1922.

=== Hungarian ===
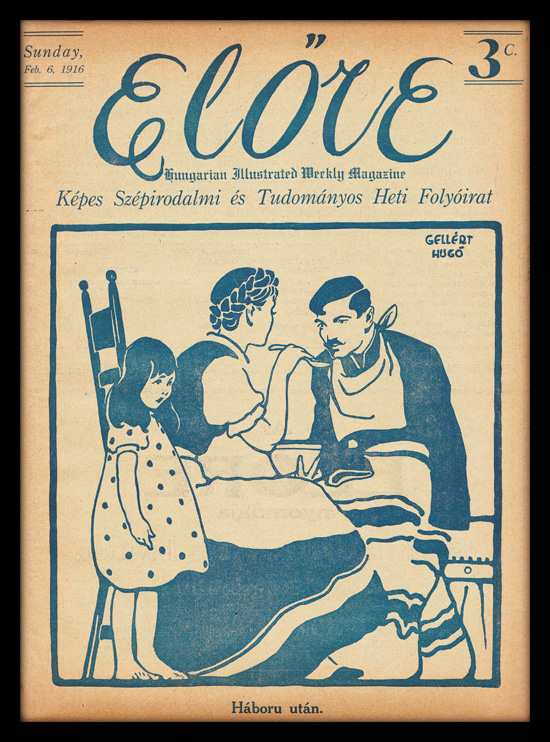
The point of reference of the Hungarian-American radical press was Előre, weekly of the Hungarian Socialist Federation. This February 1916 cover drawing by Hugo Gellert depicts an armless war veteran being spoon-fed.

- Előre (Forward) (September 1905 – October 1921) — Előre was the official organ of the Hungarian Socialist Federation, a weekly magazine first published in New York City in 1905 which came under the direct control of the Socialist Party of America (SPA) in 1915. Előre was a staunch supporter of the SPA's anti-militarist position against World War I — a position which put it on a collision course with the administration of President Woodrow Wilson when he led America into the European conflict in the spring of 1918. The government impeded the mailing of the publication and conducted police investigations of its editorial staff, forcing the paper to the financial brink. When the Hungarian Socialist Federation was suspended from the SPA during the factional war of 1919 for having lent its support to the Left Wing Section of the Socialist Party, supporters of the Communist Party of America gained control over the publication. The publication declared bankruptcy in October 1921, apparently to clear its debts, and was succeeded by a newly named New York publication only 10 days later, Új Előre (New Forward).

=== Latvian ===
- Strādnieks (The Worker) (1906–1919) — Official organ of the Latvian socialist movement, published in Boston. The Latvian socialists of the Boston area were among the earliest and most energetic supporters of the Left Wing Section of the Socialist Party and went over en bloc to the Communist Party of America in the summer of 1919. During World War I the paper was banned by the U.S. postal authorities and was replaced by Atbalss, which also fell afoul of postal authorities. In 1918, a publication called Biļetens (The Bulletin) was launched, continuing until the postal ban was lifted and Strādnieks briefly reappeared in 1919.

=== Lithuanian ===
- Kova (The Struggle) (May 1905 – December 1918) — Kova, published in Philadelphia began as the official organ of the Lithuanian Socialist Party of America, later incorporated into the Socialist Party of America as the Lithuanian Socialist Federation. Beginning as an 8-page weekly, the publication expanded in size and influence over time, typically running 12 to 16 pages in length with a circulation of from 4000 to 5000 copies. The publication tended to support the revolutionary socialist left in orientation and was militantly opposed to the European war, an orientation which brought it into conflict with the U.S. Department of Justice, leading to the paper's closure late in 1918.
- Laisvė (Freedom) (1911–1986) — Originally a Socialist Party publication published in Boston, in 1919 Laisvē transferred its allegiance along with the rest of the Lithuanian Socialist Federation to the new Communist Party of America and its editorial offices were moved to Ozone Park, New York. Circulation peaked in 1920 at just under 18,000 copies per issue. The Library of Congress holds master negative microfilm of the publication for the years 1941 to 1964.
- Darbininkių Balsas (Workers' Voice) (1916–1925+) — Not to be confused with the Baltimore IWW publication of the same name, Darbininkių Balsas was a monthly published in New York City by the Lithuanian Women's Progressive Alliance of America and came into the orbit of the Communist Party with the rest of the Lithuanian Socialist Federation in 1919. Claimed circulation of the 24-page magazine in 1924 was 4,000.

=== Norwegian/Danish ===
- Nye Normanden (The New Norwegian) (1894–1908; socialist from 1902) — Originally a Populist weekly, Nye Normanden turned to a Socialist Party orientation following the assumption of control of a new editor in 1902. The paper went through a brief bankruptcy in the summer of 1904, during which time it was briefly taken over by a Democratic Party politician and renamed Politikken (The Politics), but in 1905 the previous socialist editor returned as publisher and editor and the publication's previous name and political orientation was restored.
  - Ny Tid (New Age) (1908–1909) — In 1908, Nye Normanden editor Lauritz Stavnheim renamed his weekly newspaper Ny Tid and moved to a monthly publication cycle, initiating a new publication numbering series in association with the change. The publication ended the next year with Stavnheim's election as head of the Sons of Norway organization, which placed new constraints upon his time.
- Gaa Paa (Forward) (1903 – October 1925) — Gaa Paa was a weekly established in 1903 in Girard, Kansas, home of the mass circulation English-language socialist weekly, The Appeal to Reason. The paper was moved from Southeastern Kansas to Minneapolis, Minnesota, in 1904. The publication's circulation topped 5,000 copies in 1912, with a readership that extended beyond the bounds of Minnesota, including regular correspondents from North Dakota and the Pacific Northwest. A particularly left wing publication throughout its existence, in September 1918 the paper was denied 2nd Class mailing privileges by Postmaster General Albert S. Burleson on account of its continued anti-war perspective. In an effort to surreptitiously contravene this restriction, the publication briefly reinvented itself as Folkets Røst (The People's Voice). The paper terminated in the fall of 1925 owing to the ill health of the editor.
- Revyen (The Review) (March 1894 – September 1921) — Privately held Norwegian/Danish independent radical publication produced weekly in Chicago. The Scandinavian Socialist Federation attempted to purchase the paper in 1910 to make it into an official organ, but publisher Christian Bøtker had no interest in selling, forcing the Federation to start a new paper, Socialdemokraten, from scratch. Revyen was socialist in orientation but in no way an official organ of the Socialist Party, breaking with the organization altogether in 1917 over the party's staunch opposition to American participation in World War I. The paper continued to move to the right throughout the war years, dropping any pretext of being a socialist publication.
- Social-Demokraten (The Social Democrat) (October 1911 – March 1921; SPA: 1911–1919) — Official organ of the Scandinavian Socialist Federation of the Socialist Party of America, this Chicago publication turned to revolutionary socialism with the assumption of editorial tasks by N. Juel Christensen at the end of 1918. Following the split of the Socialist Party in the summer of 1919, Socialdemokraten was firmly allied with the Communist camp. A broken run of Socialdemokraten is available on microfilm from the Illinois State Historical Society.

=== Polish ===
- Robotnik (The Worker) (May 1896 – 1917) — Weekly newspaper launched in New York City on May Day, 1896, by Polish-American partisans of the Polish Socialist Party. The paper was moved to Chicago in 1900, to Brooklyn in 1907, and back to New York City in 1908. The paper concentrated on both American and international news, with extensive coverage of happenings in German- and Russian-occupied Poland and coverage of the activities of the nationalistically inclined Polish Socialist Alliance.
  - Robotnik Polski (The Polish Worker) (1917 – December 1967) — Polish-language socialist weekly continuing the work of the Robotnik with the same editor (R. Mazurkiewicz) and same city of origin (New York). Peaking with a circulation of more than 25,000 in 1923, the paper later moved to a monthly publication cycle
- Dziennik Ludowy (People's Daily) (1907–1925) — Chicago Polish-language socialist daily which featured longer and generally better-written articles than many of its contemporaries. In December 1908 the Polish-American socialist movement split, with a minority backing Józef Piłsudski's faction of the Polish Socialist Party, oriented towards secret paramilitary organization and terrorist action against Tsarist authority, with a majority favoring popular education and labor activism, formed the "Polish Section of the Socialist Party" (Zwiazek Polskiej Partii Socjalistyczne — or ZPPS). Dziennik Ludowy became the official organ of the latter group, which later merged with the Polish Socialist Alliance to form the Polish Socialist Federation of the Socialist Party.
  - Niedzielny Dziennik Ludowy (Sunday People's News) (1920) — Weekly Sunday edition of the Dziennik Ludowy. No examples are known to have survived.
- Swiat i Czlowiek (The World and Man) (1908–1912) — Monthly organ of the moderate faction of the Polish Socialist Party, published in Newark, New Jersey. Few copies have survived.
- Wiedza (Knowledge) (1910) — Monthly magazine of the left wing faction of the Polish Socialist Party, published in New York City. No copies are known to have survived.
- Górnik Polski (The Worker's Weekly Voice) (1912–1916) — Weekly newspaper published in Pittsburgh, Pennsylvania, on behalf of Polish-speaking miners affialiated with the United Mine Workers of America and the Socialist Party of Pennsylvania, state affiliate of the SPA. Succeeded by Głos Robotniczy. No specimens are known to have survived.
  - Głos Robotniczy (Workers' Voice) (1916–1929; Socialist: 1916–1919) — Launched in 1916 in Pittsburgh, initially as the organ of the Polish Miners' Union. The paper went daily as Codzienny Głos Robotniczy (Daily Workers' Voice) in Pittsburgh in 1917 as the publication of the left wing Polish Section of the Socialist Party, before moving to Detroit in 1919 as the organ of the Polish Section of the Communist Party. Editors included Daniel Elbaum in 1919 and Bolesław "Bill" Gebert in 1920-1922 and again from 1924 to 1925.
- Naprzód (Forward) (1912–1915) — Weekly newspaper published in Milwaukee, Wisconsin, by the Social Democratic Party of Wisconsin, state affiliate of the SPA. No copies are known to have survived.
- Praca (Work) (1915–1918) — Socialist monthly published in Detroit. No surviving specimens are known to exist.
- Czyn (Action) (April 1921 – 1924) — Organ of the left wing faction of the Polish Socialist Alliance, published weekly in Chicago. The paper merged with Trybuna Robotnicza for a time in 1923 and 1924. No specimens of the publication are known to have survived.
- Dziennik Ludowy (People's Daily) (1921–1927) — This Detroit, Michigan daily newspaper included news about the Detroit area, serialized fiction by Polish authors, and articles on socialism. No specimens of the publication are known to have survived.

=== Romanian ===
- Deșteptarea (The Awakening) (January 1914 – February 1938) — Deșteptarea began as a Detroit weekly issued by the Federation of Romanian Socialists in America and ended up as a bankrupt Detroit monthly, moving its offices along the way to Cleveland and Chicago. The paper became the official organ of the Romanian section of the Workers Party of America during the early 1920s and the Romanian section of the International Workers Order in the 1930s. Deșteptarea was one of the smallest circulation Communist Party language papers, with a press run of just 500 copies in 1925. Somewhat surprisingly, a complete run of the publication has survived.

=== Russian ===
- Novyi Mir (New World) (April 1911 – September 1938) — Originally an independent Russian-language socialist newspaper published in New York, Novyi Mir became the official organ of the Russian Socialist Federation of the Socialist Party around 1917 and one of the leading publications of the Left Wing Section of the Socialist Party in 1919. An excellent run of the publication has survived for the dates July 1917 to July 1919, available on microfilm from New York Public Library, with only sporadic issues outside of those dates. Publication was suspended during the Red Scare of 1920. Novyi Mir was absorbed by Russkii Golos in 1938.
- Svobodnoe Slovo (Free Word) (October 1915 – September 1916) — For a period of one year, twelve monthly issues of this organ of the Menshevik faction of the Russian Social Democratic Workers Party were produced in New York City by veteran Russian Marxist Lev Deutsch. The paper published articles on the actions of the Tsarist regime against the Russian revolutionary movement and included material on the socialist movement in America. A run of the publication exists in hardcopy at the New York Public Library.

=== Swedish ===
- Forskaren (The Investigator) (September 1893 – December 1924) — Non-affiliated newspaper published in Minneapolis, Minnesota, which combined the ideas of socialism and rationalism. The paper pushed the idea that socialists were bound to wage war on religion owing to its status as a bulwark of capitalism. The paper was populist until about 1896 and socialist thereafter and included some material in Norwegian, Danish, and English, in addition to Swedish.
- Svenska Socialisten (The Swedish Socialist) (1905-July 1921) — Official organ of the Scandinavian Socialist Federation, published in Chicago. The paper began as the publication of the Swedish Branch of Local Rockford, Illinois, Socialist Party before being sold to the Skandinaviska Socialist Förbundet in 1911. Circulation grew over time, from just 900 copies in 1906 to a peak of 7,000 copies in 1916. The paper was generally supportive of the American temperance movement. During World War I the paper moved to the anti-war, revolutionary socialist Left Wing under the editorship of Nils R. Swenson. Fourteen issues of the paper were lost to American postal censorship during World War I. A complete run on microfilm shot in 5 reels is available from the Wisconsin Historical Society.
  - Facklan (The Torch) (July 1921-March 1922) The Svenska Socialisten briefly changed its name to Facklan (The Torch) in July 1921. As with its predecessor, Facklan was published in Chicago. In March 1922 Facklan merged with the Rockford, Illinois paper Folket to form another publication called Ny Tid. The publication is available on microfilm, with the master negative held by the Library of Congress.
  - Ny Tid (New Times) (March 1922-July 1936) — Created through the merger of the Chicago-based Facklan and the Rockford, IL-based Folket, Ny Tid remained in print for 14 years as the official organ of the Swedish Socialist Federation. In addition to Swedish, Ny Tid also published occasional articles in Norwegian and English. In November 1931 the publication restructured and rolled back its numbering to volume 1, number 1 to start anew, continuing with the new series until its termination in July 1936. The publication is available on microfilm from the Illinois State Historical Library.
- Frihets-Facklan (The Torch of Freedom) (1907–1910+) — Publication published in Rockford, Illinois, by the former editor of the Svenska Socialisten after sale of that publication to members of the Scandinavian Socialist Federation. Only a specimen of the first issue of the publication survives, located at the Minnesota Historical Society, although the publication was reported as having been produced at least through 1910.
- Ny Tid (New Times) (September 1910 – December 1915) — Swedish-language monthly published in Chicago which described itself as a "Periodical for the Promotion of Enlightenment and Progress." Some evidence exists that this very small circulation paper (about 600 copies of each issue produced) was targeted to ethnic Finns of Swedish national origin in America.
- Gnistan (The Spark) (November 1917) — Publication of the Cleveland "Comrade Socialist Club." No copies are known to have survived and it is unclear whether more than one issue of this short-lived local publication was produced.
- Frihet (Freedom) (April–December 1919) — Originally launched as a special May Day publication, three issues of Frihet were produced in Chicago at irregular intervals in 1919. The paper was edited by Nils R. Swenson of Svenska Socialisten (The Swedish Socialist) but the contents included material in Norwegian and Danish, as well as Swedish.
- Till Kamp (To Battle) (1919) — Mimeographed local bulletin produced by the Portland, Oregon branch of the Scandinavian Socialist Federation. No specimens of the publication are known to have survived.

=== Slovak ===
- Rovnosť Ľudu (Equality of the People) (October 1906 – May 1935) — The oldest Slovak-language labor union periodical in America, Rovnosť Ľudu was founded in 1906 by Chicago area Slovak émigrés who had banded together four years previously as the Section of Slovak Socialists in Chicago. Initially a monthly, the publication went to a weekly schedule in 1908 and later became a daily. First editor J. Jesensky was sympathetic to a radical interpretation of socialism and in the 1919 split of the Socialist Party of America the publication cast its lot with the Communist Party of America.

=== Slovenian ===
Proletarec, a broadsheet Slovenian weekly published in Chicago.

- Proletarec (The Proletarian) (January 1906 - 1952) — Launched as a monthly at the start of 1906, for most of its long history Proletarec was a weekly broadsheet newspaper produced each Thursday in Chicago as the official organ of the Yugoslav Federation of the Socialist Party of America. The paper's primary language was Slovenian although for much of the paper's life it also included one or more pages in English, for the benefit of its younger readers. The paper is readily available on microfilm for the years 1918 to 1928, with the master negative held by the Wisconsin Historical Society in Madison. The paper continued into the decade of the 1950s, with the Center for Research Libraries holding a copy dated February 6, 1952.

=== Ukrainian ===
- Robitnyk (The Worker) (January 1914 – June 1918) — Robitnyk was originally the official organ of the Ukrainian Federation of the Socialist Party of America and was published in Cleveland, Ohio, from the beginning of 1914. The paper was staunchly anti-militarist and an early supporter of the Zimmerwald Left internationally and the organized Left Wing Section of the Socialist Party domestically. In 1918 the paper's editorial staff was arrested by the police and publication was suspended from July 1918 for the duration of World War I. The publication moved its editorial offices to New York City and relaunched as a new paper called Robitnychyi Vistnyk.

=== Yiddish ===
- Di Naye Welt (The New World) (August 1915 – March 1922) — Official organ of the Jewish Socialist Federation of the Socialist Party of America, edited by the head of the JSF, J.B. Salutsky — later known as "J.B.S. Hardman." Di Naye Welt stood in opposition to the moderate socialist views of the daily Forverts of Abraham Cahan, more so as the JSF moved steadily to the left at the close of the 1910s. From 1919 there was also considerable factional animosity between Salutsky and his Di Naye Welt and Alex Bittelman and his Der Kampf — an ongoing personal and ideological battle which played itself out for the next half decade. In 1922, Di Naye Welt — which had aligned itself with the Workers' Council organization in 1921 and joined forces with the American Communist organization at the time of the formation of the Workers Party of America in the last days of that year — was merged with the Yiddish-language organ of the Jewish Communist Federation, Der Emes, to form Di Naye Welt-Emes.

== See also ==
- Socialist Party of America
- English-language press of the Socialist Party of America
- Non-English press of the Communist Party USA
- Language federation
