= Amerikai Magyar Szó =

Amerikai Magyar Szó is a United States Hungarian language independent weekly newspaper published in New York City. The paper is published by the American Hungarian Federation, based in Washington, DC, a non-profit organization tracing its roots back to its founding in 1906.
