= Laisvė =

Laisvė (Freedom) was a Lithuanian-language radical political newspaper published in the United States of America from 1911 to 1986. The privately owned paper was originally associated with the American Lithuanian Socialist Union, forerunner of the Lithuanian Socialist Federation of the Socialist Party of America. After the 1919 split of that organization into Socialist and Communist wings, Laisvė became an organ of the Communist Party of America. The paper was one of the most influential and longest-running radical Lithuanian language newspapers in the US, issued daily from 1919 through 1958.

== History ==
=== Establishment ===
Laisvė was launched in Boston, Massachusetts on April 5, 1911 under the editorship of Antanas Montvydas, a recent immigrant from Lithuania. Produced twice a week at the time of its launch, the paper quickly found a readership among the Lithuanian-American community and achieved a circulation of 5,000 within its first year.

Although privately owned, Laisvė was closely associated with the Amerikos Lietuvių Socialistų Sąjunga (ALSS, American Lithuanian Socialist Union), established in 1904. Independent for a decade, this Lithuanian-speaking organization voted to affiliate with the Socialist Party of America (SPA) at the end of December 1914 and formally joined early the next year, becoming the Lithuanian Socialist Federation.

=== Development ===
The Lithuanian-American socialist movement showed significant growth during the decade of the 1910s, and Laisvė benefited from the expansion. Leonas Prūseika came on board to edit the publication in 1912 and moved the semi-weekly from Boston to Brooklyn, New York in 1914. By 1917 the paper's circulation had nearly tripled from its inaugural year, hitting 14,850.

Circulation declined somewhat during the wartime years, but the publication was not destroyed by the draconian actions against anti-war publications taken by Postmaster General Albert S. Burleson and the Woodrow Wilson administration. In 1919, following the end of World War I circulation remained at the 14,000 mark.

In the summer of 1919, the Emergency National Convention of the Socialist Party formalized the split of the organization into antagonistic Socialist and Communist wings. The Lithuanian Socialist Federation had already been suspended in June 1919 by the National Executive Committee of the SPA in June as part of the factional war and that group moved en masse into the newly established Communist Party of America (CPA). Laisvė also shifted its affiliation, becoming a de facto CPA publication. The paper was moved to a daily publication schedule (except Sunday) and its circulation increased again, hitting 17,800 in 1920—a figure that would prove to be the high point in its history.

Laisvė was formally owned by an entity called the Lithuanian Cooperative Publishing Society. The paper maintained its office at 46 Ten Eyck Street in Brooklyn.

Laisvė would remain a daily from 1919 to 1958, with its circulation gradually declining over time. The paper, typically 4 to 6 pages in length, carried a variety of national and international news and remained strongly supportive of the Soviet Union throughout its entire history, including such controversial events as the Soviet occupation of the Baltic states in the summer of 1940 and the Soviet establishment of permanent control over the Lithuanian nation in 1944.

In the period after World War II, Laisvė increased its coverage of events in Soviet Lithuania, including reprints from the Soviet Lithuanian press from 1970.

=== Decline and demise ===
The continuing decrease in numbers of the Lithuanian-speaking population in America and the general decline of the American Communist movement were decisive in the demise of Laisvė. The paper moved from a daily to a weekly publication schedule in 1958. The paper's editor of three decades, Roy Mizara, died in 1967, to be succeeded by longtime Lithuanian-American Communist journalist and historian Anthony Bimba. Bimba himself died in 1982, shortly before the final demise of the publication in 1986.

== Editors ==
- Antanas Montvydas (1911–1912)
- Leonas Prūseika (1912–1917)
- Vincas Paukštys (1917–1933)
- Kazimieras "Kazys" Vidikas (1933–1937)
- Rojus "Roy" Mizara (1937–1967)
- Antanas "Anthony" Bimba (1967–1982)
- Ieva Mizarienė (1982–1984)
- Editorial Collective (1984–1986)

== See also ==
- Non-English press of the Socialist Party of America
- Non-English press of the Communist Party USA
