= Proletar =

- Type: Weekly newspaper
- Publisher: Proletarian Publishing Co.
- Founded: 1924
- Political alignment: communist
- Language: Armenian language
- Headquarters: 407, Fourth Avenue, New York
- Circulation: 1,100

Proletar ('The Proletarian') was a 4-page Armenian language communist weekly newspaper published in New York City, New York, founded in 1924. The newspaper was published by the Proletarian Publishing Co. The newspaper claimed a circulation of 1,100 copies in 1924.
