= Lajos Bebrits =

Hungarian politician (1891–1963)

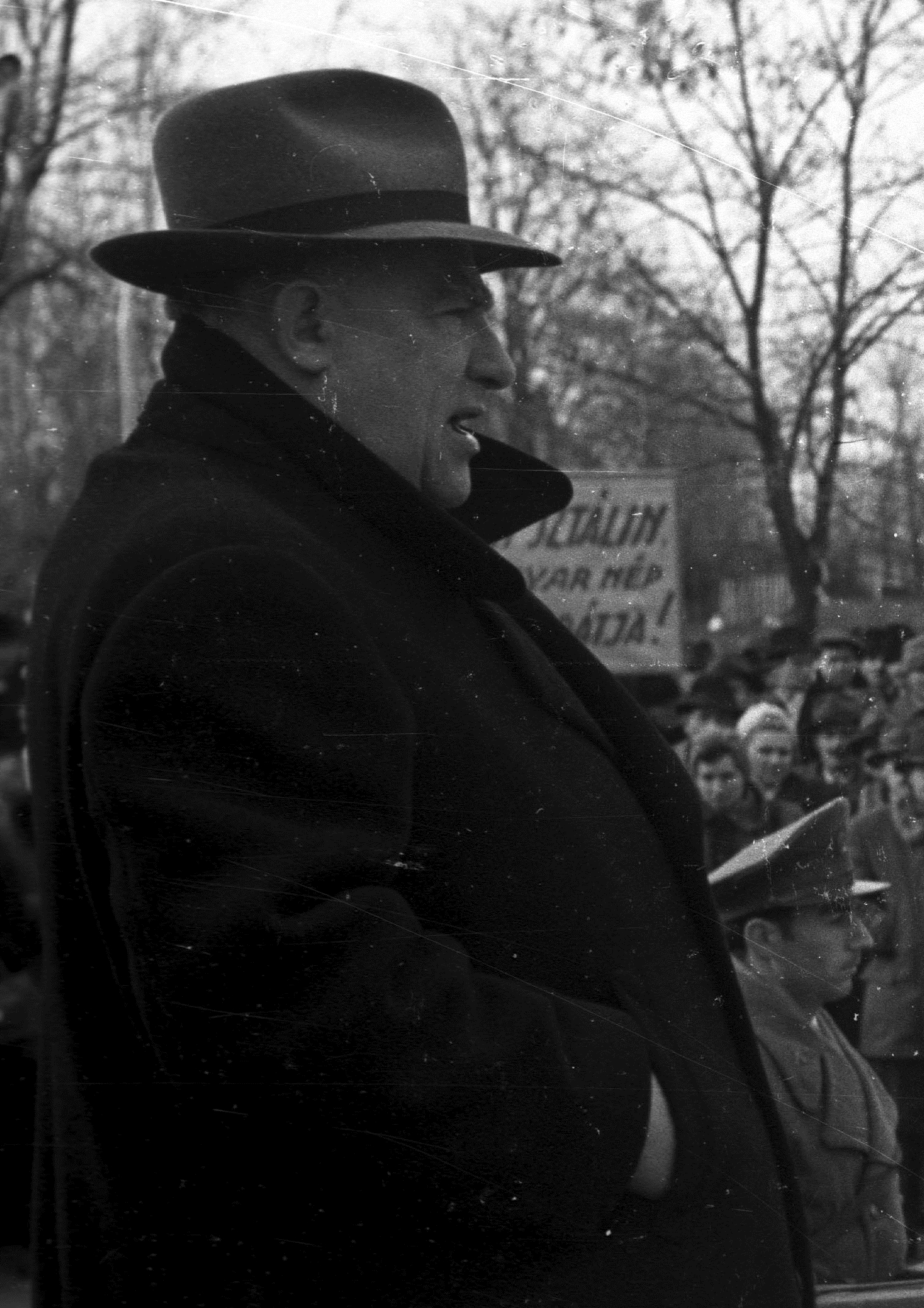
Bebrits in 1949

Lajos Bebrits (14 December 1891 – 9 August 1963) was a Hungarian communist newspaper editor and politician. He is best remembered in the United States as the long-time editor of Új Előre (New Forward), the Hungarian language newspaper of the Communist Party USA. Bebrits was deported by the United States government in 1932, living in the Soviet Union until the end of World War II. He was arrested during the Great Terror in 1938 and spent 21 months in prison before being released through prosecutorial review of his case. After the end of the Second World War, Bebrits returned to communist Hungary, where he was elected a member of parliament.

== Biography ==
=== Early years ===
Lajos Bebrits was born December 14, 1891, in Teregova, in the Krassó-Szörény County of the Kingdom of Hungary (now in Caraș-Severin County, Romania).

=== Political career ===
Bebrits joined the Social Democratic Party of Hungary in 1917.

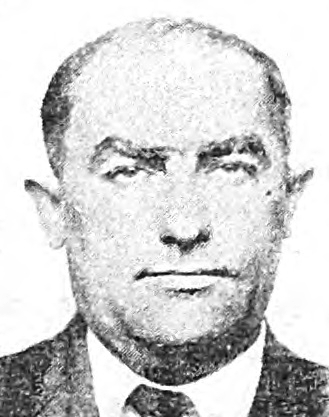
Bebrits c. 1930

Between 1923 and 1932 Bebrits lived in the United States, where he served as the head of the Hungarian section of the Communist Party USA and on the editorial staff of Új Előre (New Forward), the official organ of the Hungarian-American communist organization.

Bebrits came under scrutiny of the U.S. Department of Justice as a resident alien communist and was deported to the Soviet Union in 1932. In 1934 he wrote a book on the differences between life in the United States and Soviet Russia.

In 1938, during the Great Purge which swept the USSR, Bebrits was arrested on charges of espionage, accused of having participated in a "Trotskyist conspiracy." He remained in prison for some 21 months, fortunately gaining his release in 1939 due to prosecutorial review of the evidence in his case.

Following World War II, Bebrits returned to Hungary, where he served as State Minister for Transport and Post and as a member of the National Assembly.

In 1957, Bebrits was named Hungarian ambassador to Sweden, Norway, and Iceland. He remained in that post for two years.

From 1959, Bebrits served as head of the Hungarian National Tourist Board, retiring from that post in 1962.

=== Death and legacy ===
Bebrits died August 9, 1963, in Budapest. He was 72 years old at the time of his death.

== Works ==
- Tisztelt elvtárs!... USA. vagy USSR? (Comrades!... USA or USSR?) Moscow: A Szovetunióban élő külföldi munkások kiadóvállalata (Publishing Society of Foreign Workers in the USSR), 1934.
- Négy ország viharaiban. Bebrits Lajos élete. (Four Storms of the Country: The Life of Lajos Bebrits) With Gyula Kékesdi. Budapest: n.p., 1967.
