= Baltic Fleet electoral district =

Electoral constituency in Russian Republic

The Baltic Fleet electoral district (Russian: Балтийско-флотский избирательный округ) was a constituency created for the 1917 Russian Constituent Assembly election. The electoral district covered the military forces and employees and workers at bases under the command of the Baltic Fleet. Baltic Fleet used a separate electoral system, where the voter could vote for two individual candidates rather than fixed party lists. Notably, Vladimir Lenin was elected to the Constituent Assembly from the Baltic Fleet district.

== Candidatures ==
=== Bolsheviks ===
The Baltic Fleet was a revolutionary bastion. The Bolsheviks in Tsentrobalt submitted their petition, with some two hundred signatures, to the electoral commission on October 12, 1917. Their list had Lenin as its first candidate and with Pavel Dybenko as its second name. Whilst the conducting the election campaign, the Bolsheviks in the Baltic Fleet prepared their role in the pending uprising against the Provisional Government.

=== Officers Union ===
On the diametrical opposite end of the political spectrum was the Officers' Union or PROMOR. Different officers groups had emerged in the wake of the February Revolution, with the Union of Naval Officers of Revel (SMOR) being the most dynamic. SMOR was led by Commander Boris Dudorov, who would be named Deputy Minister of War for the Navy under Kerensky. In Helsingfors (Helsinki) the first officers' union had been formed on March 10, 1917, led by captains I. I. Rengarten and Prince M. B. Cherkassky. This group had some 200 followers, including SR-oriented officers. The Rengarten-Cherkassky liberal group was initially affiliated with the Union of Officer-Republicans of the People's Army, but this bond did not last as the latter platform shifted further to the left. A more right-wing oriented and larger group in Helsingfors was formed on March 22, 1917; the Union of Union of Officer-Republicans, Doctors and Officials of the Army and Navy of the Sveaborg Base with Lt. Vladimir Demchinsky as its chairman. Demchinsky's group included Kadets and conservatives, and opposed socialism. SMOR and Demchinsky's group supported the Provisional Government and opposed to revolutionary and antiwar politics in the navy. There were also smaller groups of officials, such as in Åbo (Turku). On May 23, 1917 the different officers' groups united in the 'All-Baltic Professional Union of Officers, Doctors and Officials of the Fleet and Bases of the Baltic Sea' or PROMOR. The Officers' Union candidates for the Constituent Assembly were Demchinsky and Rengarten.

=== Socialist-Revolutionaries ===
The official SR list for the Baltic Fleet constituency was dominated by the left-wing. Its candidates were Prosh Proshian and Pavel Shishko. The right-wing SRs fielded a dissident slate with Sergey Tsion (leader of the 1906 Sveaborg rebellion) and Maslov as their candidates.

=== Non-Partisans ===
The fifth and last candidature was a supposedly non-partisan group with German Lopatin and Magnitzky as their candidates.

== Campaign and voting ==
The election campaign received plenty attention in the fleet newspapers. The campaign of non-Bolshevik candidates was largely confined to Helsingfors. Electoral participation stood at around 70%. 76% of sailors voted, but the sailors were outnumbered by workers and soldiers at the naval bases. The outcome of the vote indicated strong dissatisfaction with the performance of the Provisional Government, as the combined Bolshevik/Left SR vote stood at around 85% (the highest of all electoral constituencies nationwide). Radkey claims Dybenko was the most voted Bolshevik candidate, placing Lenin second. Dybenko was himself a sailor, and likewise in the case of the SRs sailor candidates Shisko and Maslov scored higher votes than non-sailor political leaders.

Saul (1978) expresses strong concerns over the accuracy of the result presented by Radkey. Saul (1978) reports the following result from the Helsingfors region of the Baltic Fleet electoral district (with results from 97 out of 100 electoral precincts); 22,670 votes for Dybenko, 22,237 votes for Lenin, 13,617 votes for Shishko, 12,906 votes for Proshian, 7,620 votes for Maslov, 7,351 votes for Tsion, 855 votes for Demchinsky and 838 votes for Rengarten. According to Soviet sources the non-partisan group got one percent of the votes in Helsingfors. In Kronstadt an 84% vote for the Bolsheviks was recorded. On the battleships the Bolsheviks won some 70% of the vote, whilst the (left) SRs dominated the vote in the Åbo–Åland region (which had smaller ships).

Protasov (1997) presents slightly different results than Radkey, stating that Bolsheviks obtained 66,810 votes, Socialist-Revolutionaries (presumably both of the SR lists) 45,016 votes and others (presumably the two remaining lists) 3,997 votes.

== Results ==
=== Members ===
Baltic Fleet
Election	Deputy (Party)	Deputy (Party)
1917	Vladimir Lenin (Bolshevik Party)	Pavel Dybenko (Bolshevik Party)

=== Election 1917 ===
Baltic Fleet
1917 Constituent Assembly election: Baltic Fleet
Party	Votes	%	Seats
Bolsheviks	65,093	57.70	2
Socialist-Revolutionaries	30,510	27.04	–
Right-Wing Socialist-Revolutionaries	13,249	11.74	–
Officers' Union (PROMOR)	2,018	1.79	–
Non-partisan Group	1,948	1.73	–
Total:	112,818	N/A	2
