= Russian Revolution of 1905 =

Political and social unrest in the Russian Empire

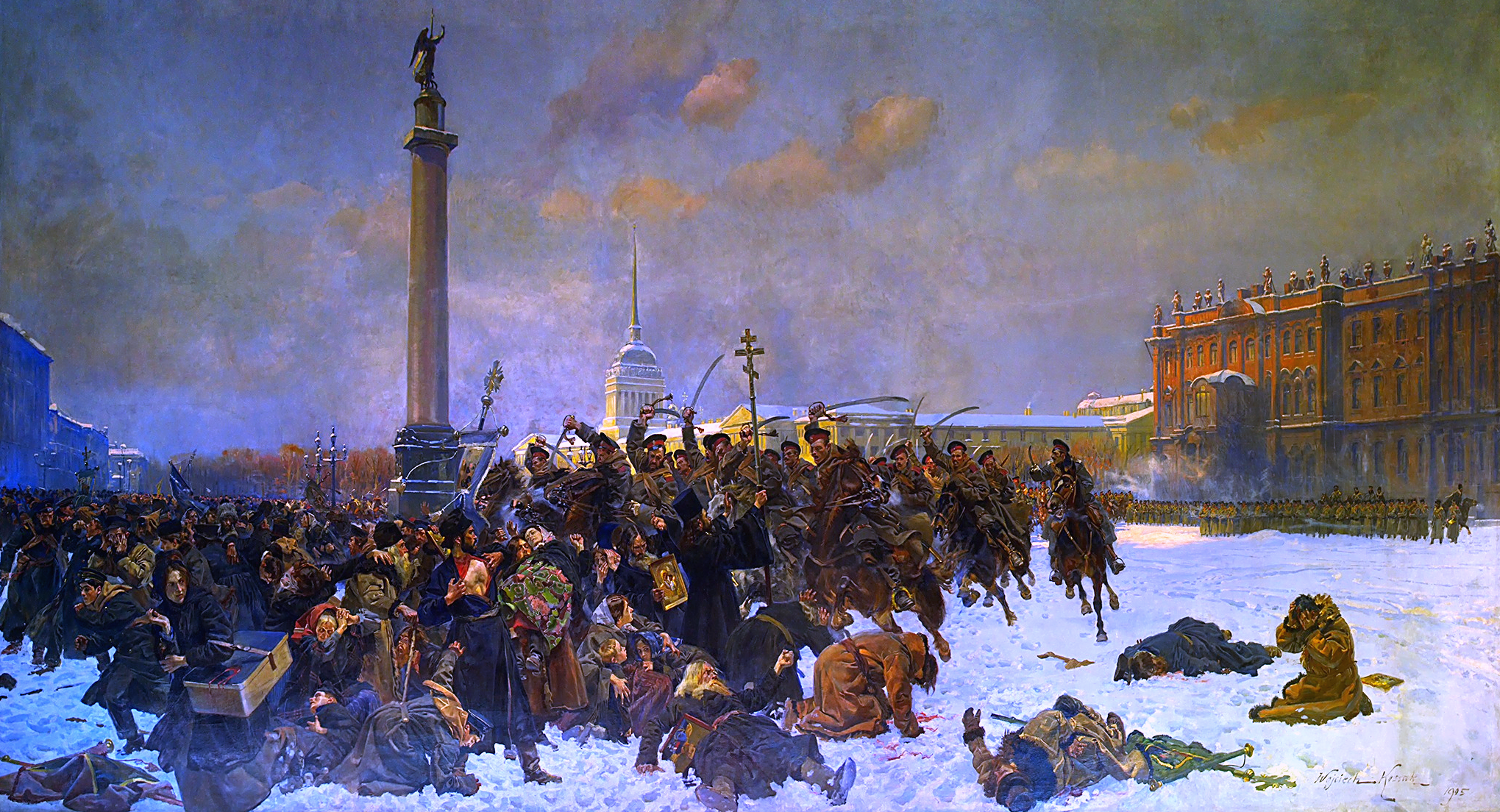
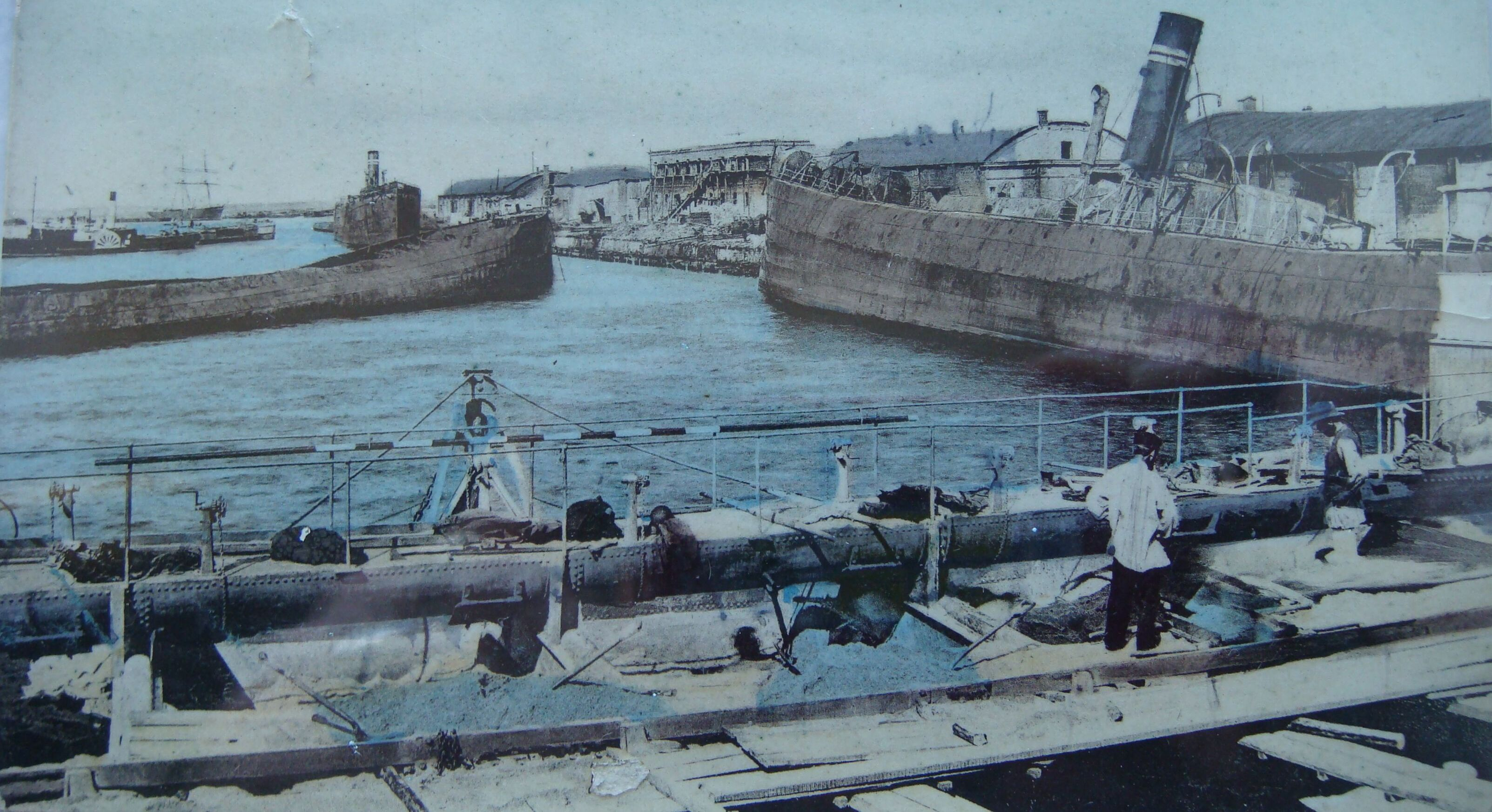
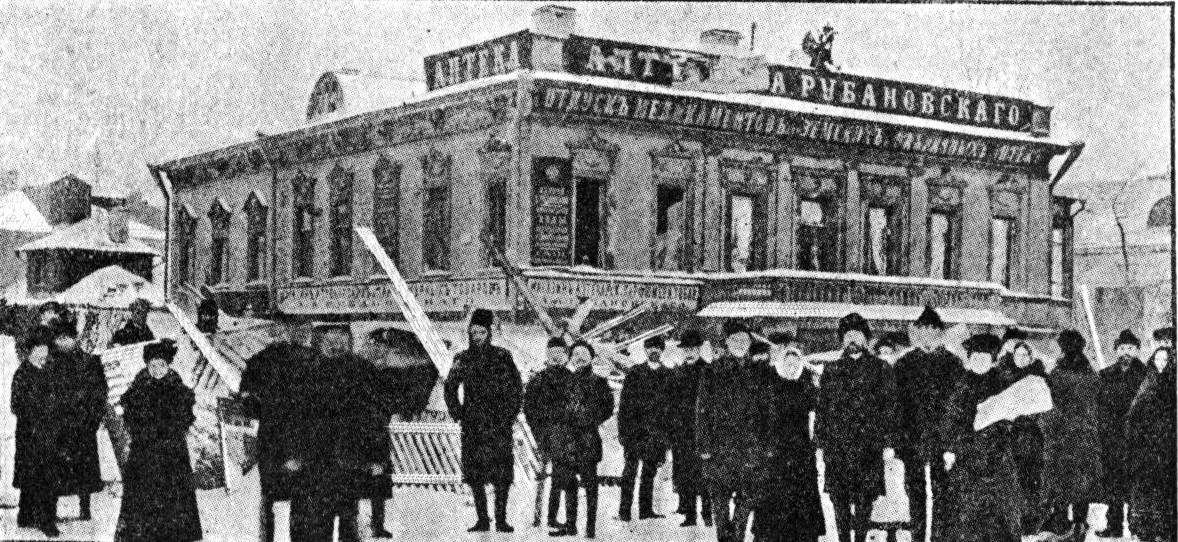
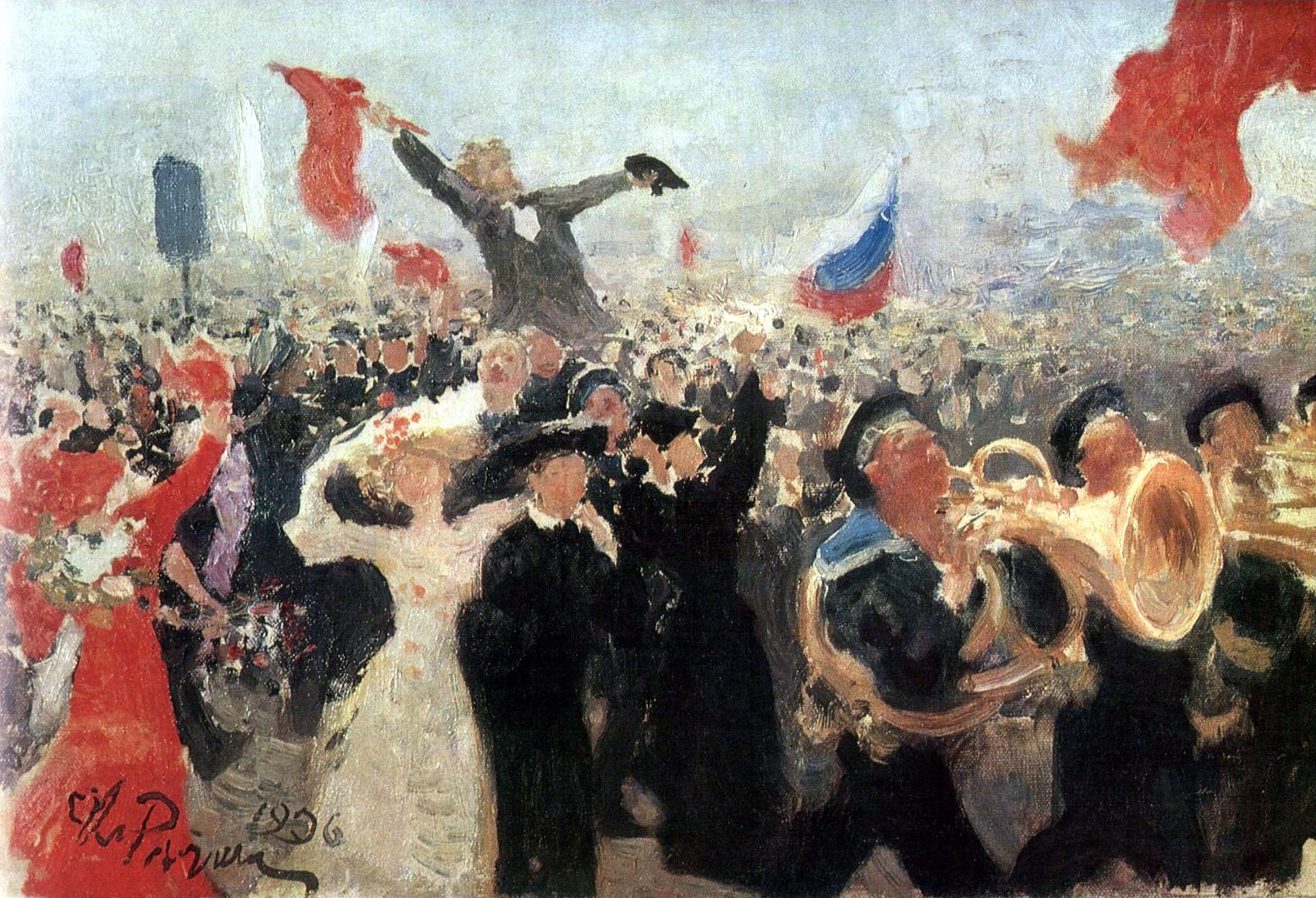
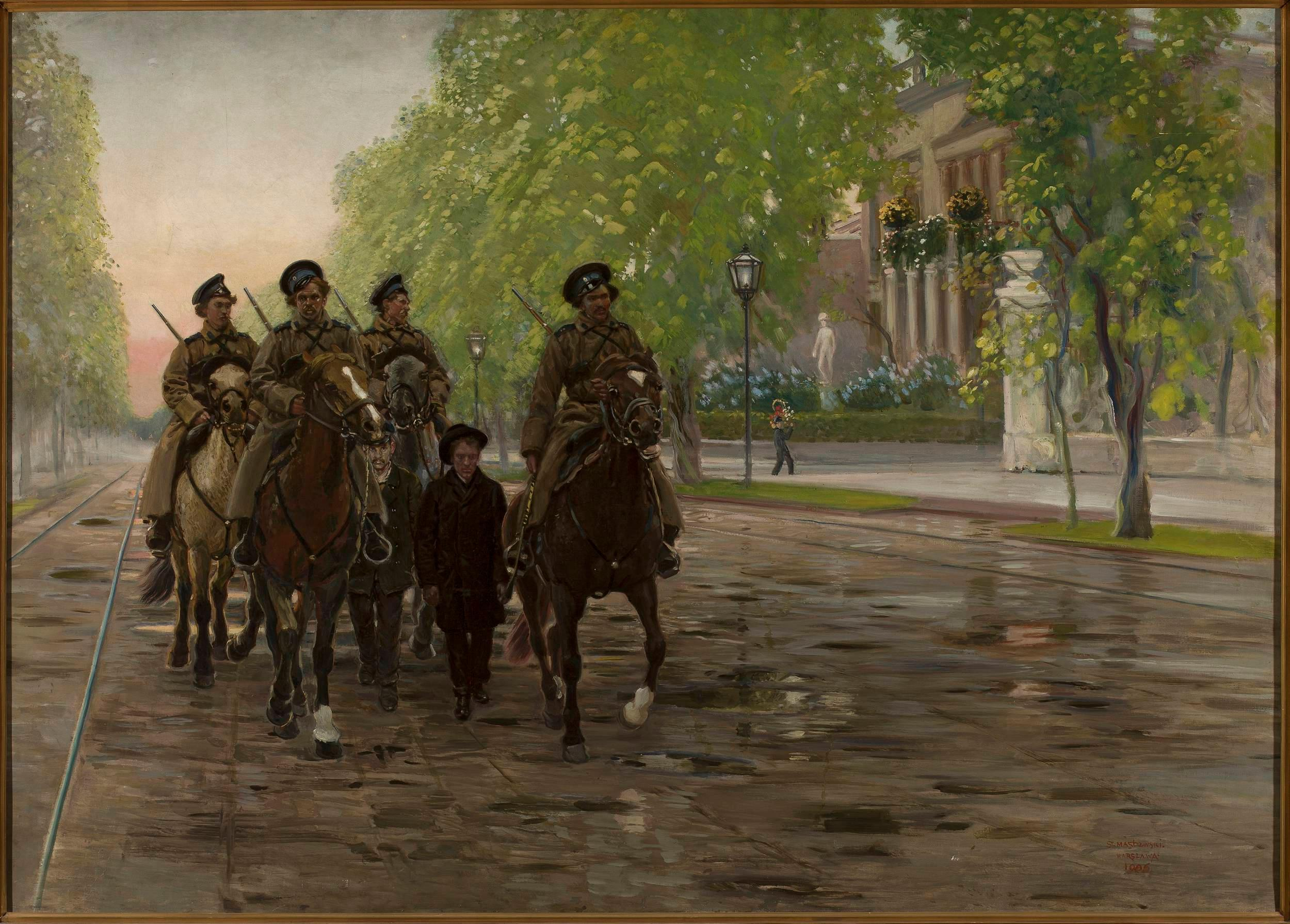
- Upper row: Bloody Sunday by Wojciech Kossak; View of Odessa harbour after Potemkin Mutiny; Middle: Barricades during the Moscow Uprising; Lower row: Demonstration on October 17, 1905 by Ilya Repin; Russian Cossacks patrolling Warsaw in spring 1906 by Stanisław Masłowski
Date	22 January 1905 – 16 June 1907 (2 years, 4 months and 25 days)
Location	Russian Empire
Result	Government victory: Democratization of government; Nicholas II retains the throne; October Manifesto; Constitution enacted; Establishment of the State Duma

Belligerents
(Russian Empire) Russian Empire; Supported by: Russian Army; Okhrana; Black Hundreds; Russian nobility; Gentry assembly	Revolutionaries; Supported by: Saint Petersburg Soviet; Moscow City Duma; Chita Republic; Party of Socialist Revolutionaries; Russian Social Democratic Labour Party; Kagal; Union of Liberation

Commanders and leaders
Nicholas II; Sergei Witte; Dmitri Feodorovich Trepov	Viktor Chernov; Leon Trotsky; Georgy Gapon; Pavel Milyukov

Casualties and losses
3,611 killed or wounded	15,000 killed; 20,000 wounded; 38,000 captured; 1 battleship surrendered to Romania
- 17,000 civilians killed by revolutionaries

The Russian Revolution of 1905, (Note: Russian: Революция 1905 года.) also known as the First Russian Revolution, (Note: Russian: Первая Русская Революция.) was a revolution in the Russian Empire which began on 22 January 1905 and led to the establishment of a constitutional monarchy under the Russian Constitution of 1906, the country's first. The revolution saw mass political and social unrest, including worker strikes, peasant revolts, and military mutinies directed against Tsar Nicholas II and the autocracy, who were compelled to establish the State Duma legislative assembly and grant certain rights to the population, though both were later undermined.

In the years leading up to the revolution, Russian peasants had become increasingly aggrieved by repression from their landlords and the continuation of semi-feudal relations. Further discontent grew due to mounting losses in the Russo-Japanese War, poor conditions for workers, and urban unemployment. On 22 January [O.S. 9 January] 1905, known as "Bloody Sunday," a peaceful procession of workers, led by Georgy Gapon, was fired on by guards outside the tsar's Winter Palace in Saint Petersburg. Demonstrations and strikes spread across the empire, and were brutally repressed by troops. In June, sailors on the battleship Potemkin mutinied, and in October, a strike by railway workers turned into a general strike in Saint Petersburg and Moscow. Workers established councils, including the inaugural St. Petersburg Soviet of Workers' Deputies, to debate their course of action. The influence of revolutionary parties, in particular the Socialist Revolutionary Party and Russian Social Democratic Labour Party, escalated; at the same time, reactionary pro-monarchist Black Hundreds began attacks on revolutionaries and the Jewish population.

In response, the tsar issued the "October Manifesto," a pledge to create a legislative assembly, halt censorship and violations of freedom of association, and expand the right to vote. The constitution, drafted by Sergei Witte and enacted on 6 May [O.S. 23 April] 1906, did not bring an immediate end to the turmoil, as revolutionaries continued to rally for a constituent assembly. The movement for reform fragmented into conservative Octobrist and liberal Kadet factions, and the left split over demands for the tsar's overthrow. Despite popular participation, the Duma was unable to issue laws of its own, and came into conflict with the tsar, who in July 1906 dissolved the first Duma and appointed Pyotr Stolypin as prime minister, who set about restoring autocratic rule. In June 1907, the second Duma was dissolved and an electoral reform favoring the propertied class was decreed.

Many historians contend that the Revolution of 1905 set the stage for the Russian Revolution of 1917, which saw the monarchy abolished, the tsar executed, and a socialist state established. Calls for the peasantry and workers to take power by force were present in the 1905 revolution, but many of the revolutionaries who were in a potential position to lead were either in exile or in prison while it took place. Vladimir Lenin later famously described the Revolution of 1905 as the "dress rehearsal" without which the "victory of the October Revolution in 1917 would have been impossible."

== Causes ==
Subdivisions of the Russian Empire in 1897 (uyezd level)

Because the Russian economy was tied to European finances, the contraction of Western money markets in 1899–1900 plunged Russian industry into a deep and prolonged crisis; it outlasted the dip in European industrial production. This setback aggravated social unrest during the five years preceding the revolution of 1905.

The Tsarist government recognised some of these problems, albeit shortsightedly. The Minister of the Interior Vyacheslav von Plehve had said in 1903 that, after the agrarian problem, the most serious issues plaguing the country were those of the Jews, the schools, and the workers, in that order.

Any residual popular loyalty to Tsar Nicholas II was lost on 22 January 1905, when his soldiers fired upon a crowd of protesting workers, led by Georgy Gapon, who were marching to present a petition at the Winter Palace.

=== Agrarian problem ===
Every year, thousands of nobles in debt mortgaged their estates to the noble land bank or sold them to municipalities, merchants, or peasants. By the time of the revolution, the nobility had sold off one-third of its land and mortgaged another third. The peasants had been freed by the emancipation reform of 1861, but their lives were generally quite limited. The government hoped to develop the peasants as a politically conservative, land-holding class by enacting laws to enable them to buy land from nobility by paying small installments over many decades.

Such land, known as "allotment land", would not be owned by individual peasants but by the community of peasants; individual peasants would have rights to strips of land to be assigned to them under the open field system. A peasant could not sell or mortgage this land, so in practice he could not renounce his rights to his land, and he would be required to pay his share of redemption dues to the village commune. This plan was intended to prevent peasants from becoming part of the proletariat. However, the peasants were not given enough land to provide for their needs:

Their earnings were often so small that they could neither buy the food they needed nor keep up the payment of taxes and redemption dues they owed the government for their land allotments. By 1903 their total arrears in payments of taxes and dues was 118 million rubles.

The situation worsened as masses of hungry peasants roamed the countryside looking for work and sometimes walked hundreds of kilometers to find it. Desperate peasants proved capable of violence. "In the provinces of Kharkov and Poltava in 1902, thousands of them, ignoring restraints and authority, burst out in a rebellious fury that led to extensive destruction of property and looting of noble homes before troops could be brought to subdue and punish them."

These violent outbreaks caught the attention of the government, so it created many committees to investigate the causes. The committees concluded that no part of the countryside was prosperous; some parts, especially the fertile areas known as the "black-soil region", were in decline. Although cultivated acreage had increased in the last half century, the increase had not been proportionate to the growth of the peasant population, which had doubled. "There was general agreement at the turn of the century that Russia faced a grave and intensifying agrarian crisis due mainly to rural overpopulation with an annual excess of fifteen to eighteen live births over deaths per 1,000 inhabitants." The investigations revealed many difficulties but the committees could not find solutions that were both sensible and "acceptable" to the government.

=== Nationality problem ===
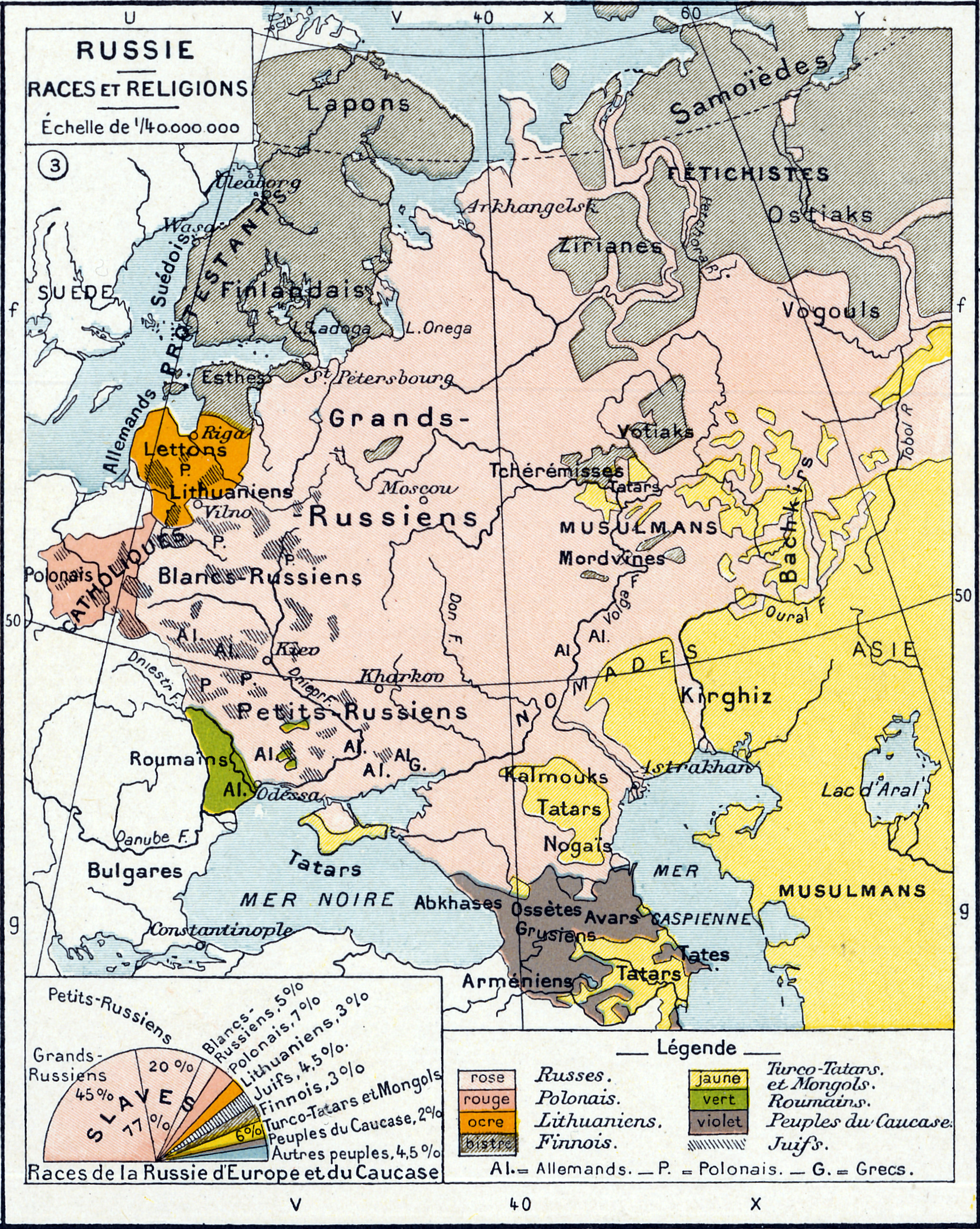
French ethnic map of European Russia from 1898. In accordance with official "All-Russian" ideology of the time, the group labelled "Russians" includes not only what are considered Russians today (here called "Great Russians"), but also Belarusians ("White Russians") and Ukrainians ("Little Russians").

Russia was a multi-ethnic empire. Nineteenth-century Russians saw cultures and religions in a clear hierarchy. Non-Russian cultures were tolerated in the empire but were not necessarily respected. Culturally, Europe was favored over Asia, as was Orthodox Christianity over other religions.

For generations, Russian Jews had been considered a special problem. Jews constituted only about 4% of the population but were concentrated in the western borderlands. Like other minorities in Russia, the Jews lived "miserable and circumscribed lives, forbidden to settle or acquire land outside the cities and towns, legally limited in attendance at secondary school and higher schools, virtually barred from legal professions, denied the right to vote for municipal councilors, and excluded from services in the Navy or the Guards".

The government's treatment of Jews, although considered a separate issue, was similar to its policies in dealing with all national and religious minorities. Historian Theodore Weeks notes: "Russian administrators, who never succeeded in coming up with a legal definition of 'Pole', despite the decades of restrictions on that ethnic group, regularly spoke of individuals 'of Polish descent' or, alternatively, 'of Russian descent', making identity a function of birth." This policy only succeeded in producing or aggravating feelings of disloyalty. There was growing impatience with their inferior status and resentment against "Russification".

Besides the imposition of a uniform Russian culture throughout the empire, the government's pursuit of Russification, especially during the second half of the nineteenth century, had political motives. After the emancipation of the serfs in 1861, the Russian state was compelled to take into account public opinion, but the government failed to gain the public's support. Another motive for Russification policies was the Polish uprising of 1863. Unlike other minority nationalities, the Poles, in the eyes of the Tsar, were a direct threat to the empire's stability. After the rebellion was crushed, the government implemented policies to reduce Polish cultural influences. In the 1870s the government began to distrust German elements on the western border. The Russian government felt that the unification of Germany would upset the power balance among the great powers of Europe and that Germany would use its strength against Russia. The government thought that the borders would be defended better if the borderland were more "Russian" in character. The culmination of cultural diversity created a cumbersome nationality problem that plagued the Russian government in the years leading up to the revolution.

=== Labour problem ===
The economic situation in Russia before the revolution presented a grim picture. The government had experimented with laissez-faire capitalist policies, but this strategy largely failed to gain traction within the Russian economy until the 1890s. Meanwhile, "agricultural productivity stagnated, while international prices for grain dropped, and Russia's foreign debt and need for imports grew. War and military preparations continued to consume government revenues. At the same time, there was a widespread famine in 1891, which strained the ability of peasants to pay taxes.

In the 1890s, under Finance Minister Sergei Witte, a crash governmental program was proposed to promote industrialization. His policies included heavy government expenditures for railroad building and operations, subsidies and supporting services for private industrialists, high protective tariffs for Russian industries (especially heavy industry), an increase in exports, currency stabilization, and encouragement of foreign investments. His plan was successful and during the 1890s "Russian industrial growth averaged 8 percent per year. Railroad mileage grew from a very substantial base by 40 percent between 1892 and 1902." Ironically, Witte's success in implementing this program helped spur the 1905 revolution and eventually the 1917 revolution because it exacerbated social tensions. "Besides dangerously concentrating a proletariat, a professional and a rebellious student body in centers of political power, industrialization infuriated both these new forces and the traditional rural classes." The government policy of financing industrialization through taxing peasants forced millions of peasants to work in towns. The "peasant worker" saw his labour in the factory as the means to consolidate his family's economic position in the village and played a role in determining the social consciousness of the urban proletariat. The new concentrations and flows of peasants spread urban ideas to the countryside, breaking down isolation of peasants on communes.

Industrial workers began to feel dissatisfaction with the Tsarist government despite the protective labour laws the government decreed. Some of those laws included the prohibition of children under 12 from working, with the exception of night work in glass factories. Employment of children aged 12 to 15 was prohibited on Sundays and holidays. Workers had to be paid in cash at least once a month, and limits were placed on the size and bases of fines for tardy workers. Employers were prohibited from charging workers for the cost of lighting of the shops and plants. Despite these labour protections, the workers believed that the laws were not enough to free them from unfair and inhumane practices. At the start of the 20th century, Russian industrial workers worked on average 11-hours per day (10 hours on Saturday), factory conditions were perceived as grueling and often unsafe, and attempts at independent unions were often not accepted. Many workers were forced to work beyond the maximum of 11 1/2 hours per day. Others were still subject to arbitrary and excessive fines for tardiness, mistakes in their work, or absence. Russian industrial workers were also the lowest-wage workers in Europe. Although the cost of living in Russia was low, "the average worker's 16 rubles per month could not buy the equal of what the French worker's 110 francs would buy for him." Furthermore, the same labour laws prohibited the organisation of trade unions and strikes. Dissatisfaction turned into despair for many impoverished workers, which made them more sympathetic to radical ideas. These discontented, radicalized workers became key to the revolution by participating in illegal strikes and revolutionary protests.

The government responded by arresting labour agitators and enacting more "paternalistic" legislation. Introduced in 1900 by Sergei Zubatov, head of the Moscow security department, "police socialism" planned to have workers form workers' societies with police approval to "provide healthful, fraternal activities and opportunities for cooperative self-help together with 'protection' against influences that might have inimical effect on loyalty to job or country". Some of these groups organised in Moscow, Odessa, Kiev, Nikolaev, and Kharkov, but these groups and the idea of police socialism failed.

From 1900 to 1903, the period of industrial depression caused many firm bankruptcies and a reduction in the employment rate. Employees were restive: they would join legal organisations but turn the organisations toward an end that the organisations' sponsors did not intend. Workers used legitimate means to organise strikes or to draw support for striking workers outside these groups. A strike that began in 1902 by workers in the railroad shops in Vladikavkaz and Rostov-on-Don created such a response that by the next summer, 225,000 in various industries in southern Russia and Transcaucasia were on strike. These were not the first illegal strikes in the country's history but their aims, and the political awareness and support among workers and non-workers, made them more troubling to the government than earlier strikes. The government responded by closing all legal organisations by the end of 1903.

=== Radicalization of students ===
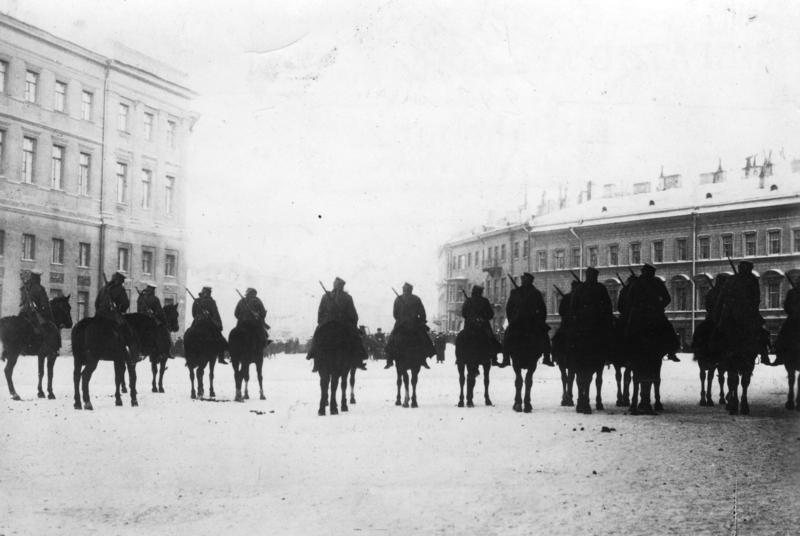
January 9, 1905. Cavalrymen at the Pevchesky Bridge block the march of the protesters to the Winter Palace

The Minister of the Interior, Plehve, designated schools as a pressing problem for the government, but he did not realize it was only a symptom of antigovernment feelings among the educated class. Students of universities, other schools of higher learning, and occasionally of secondary schools and theological seminaries were part of this group.

Student radicalism began around the time Tsar Alexander II came to power. Alexander abolished serfdom and enacted fundamental reforms in the legal and administrative structure of the Russian empire, which were revolutionary for their time. He lifted many restrictions on universities and abolished obligatory uniforms and military discipline. This ushered in a new freedom in the content and reading lists of academic courses. In turn, that created student subcultures, as youth were willing to live in poverty in order to receive an education. As universities expanded, there was a rapid growth of newspapers, journals, and an organisation of public lectures and professional societies. The 1860s was a time when the emergence of a new public sphere was created in social life and professional groups. This created the idea of their right to have an independent opinion.

The government was alarmed by these communities, and in 1861 tightened restrictions on admission and prohibited student organisations; these restrictions resulted in the first ever student demonstration, held in St. Petersburg, which led to a two-year closure of the university. The consequent conflict with the state was an important factor in the chronic student protests over subsequent decades. The atmosphere of the early 1860s gave rise to political engagement by students outside universities that became a tenet of student radicalism by the 1870s. Student radicals described "the special duty and mission of the student as such to spread the new word of liberty. Students were called upon to extend their freedoms into society, to repay the privilege of learning by serving the people, and to become in Nikolai Ogarev's phrase 'apostles of knowledge'." During the next two decades, universities produced a significant share of Russia's revolutionaries. Prosecution records from the 1860s and 1870s show that more than half of all political offences were committed by students despite being a minute proportion of the population. "The tactics of the left-wing students proved to be remarkably effective, far beyond what any of the students would have dreamed. Sensing that neither the university administrations nor the government possessed the will or authority to enforce regulations, radicals simply went ahead with their plans to turn the schools into centres of political activity for students and non-students alike."

They took up problems that were unrelated to their "proper employment", and displayed defiance and radicalism by boycotting examinations, rioting, arranging marches in sympathy with strikers and political prisoners, circulating petitions, and writing anti-government propaganda.

This disturbed the government, but it believed the cause was lack of training in patriotism and religion. Therefore, the curriculum was "toughened up" to emphasize classical language and mathematics in secondary schools, but defiance continued. Expulsion, exile, and forced military service also did not stop students. "In fact, when the official decision to overhaul the whole educational system was finally made, in 1904, and to that end Vladimir Glazov, head of General Staff Academy, was selected as Minister of Education, the students had grown bolder and more resistant than ever."

== Rise of the opposition ==
The events of 1905 came after progressive and academic agitation for more political democracy and limits to Imperial rule in Russia, and an increase in strikes by workers against employers for radical economic demands and union recognition, (especially in southern Russia). As an example, Trotsky who would assume a central role in the 1905 revolution, would write several proclamations urging for improved economic conditions, political rights and the use of strike action against the Imperial regime on behalf of workers.

Many socialists view this as a period when the rising revolutionary movement was met with rising reactionary movements. As Rosa Luxemburg stated in 1906 in The Mass Strike, when collective strike activity was met with what is perceived as repression from an autocratic state, economic and political demands grew into and reinforced each other.

Russian progressives formed the Union of Zemstvo Constitutionalists in 1903 and the Union of Liberation in 1904, which called for a constitutional monarchy. Russian socialists formed two major groups: the Socialist Revolutionary Party (founded in 1902), which followed the Russian populist tradition, and the Marxist Russian Social Democratic Labour Party (founded in 1898).

In late 1904 liberals started a series of banquets (modeled on the campagne des banquets leading up to the French Revolution of 1848), nominally celebrating the 40th anniversary of the liberal court statutes, but actually an attempt to circumvent laws against political gatherings. The banquets resulted in calls for political reforms and a constitution. In November 1904 a Zemsky Congress (Russian: Земский съезд)—a gathering of zemstvo delegates representing all levels of Russian society—called for a constitution, civil liberties and a parliament. On 13 December [O.S. 30 November] 1904, the Moscow City Duma passed a resolution demanding the establishment of an elected national legislature, full freedom of the press, and freedom of religion. Similar resolutions and appeals from other city dumas and zemstvo councils followed.

Emperor Nicholas II made a move to meet many of these demands, appointing liberal Pyotr Dmitrievich Sviatopolk-Mirsky as Minister of the Interior after the July 1904 assassination of Vyacheslav von Plehve. On 25 December [O.S. 12 December] 1904, the Emperor issued a manifesto promising the broadening of the zemstvo system and more authority for local municipal councils, insurance for industrial workers, the emancipation of Inorodtsy and the abolition of censorship. The crucial demand—that for a representative national legislature—was missing in the manifesto.

Worker strikes in the Caucasus broke out in March 1902. Strikes on the railways, originating from pay disputes, took on other issues and drew in other industries, culminating in a general strike at Rostov-on-Don in November 1902. Daily meetings of 15,000 to 20,000 heard openly revolutionary appeals for the first time, before a massacre defeated the strikes. But reaction to the massacres brought political demands to purely economic ones. Luxemburg described the situation in 1903 by saying: "the whole of South Russia in May, June and July was aflame", including Baku (where separate wage struggles culminated in a citywide general strike) and Tiflis, where commercial workers gained a reduction in the working day, and were joined by factory workers. In 1904, massive strike waves broke out in Odessa in the spring, in Kiev in July, and in Baku in December. This all set the stage for the strikes in St. Petersburg in December 1904 to January 1905 seen as the first step in the 1905 revolution.

Years	Average annual strikes
1862–1869	6
1870–1884	20
1885–1894	33
1895–1905	176

Another contributing factor behind the revolution was the Bloody Sunday massacre of protesters that took place in January 1905 in St. Petersburg sparked a spate of civil unrest in the Russian Empire. Lenin urged Bolsheviks to take a greater role in the events, encouraging violent insurrection. In doing so, he adopted SR slogans regarding "armed insurrection", "mass terror", and "the expropriation of gentry land", resulting in Menshevik accusations that he had deviated from orthodox Marxism. In turn, he insisted that the Bolsheviks split completely with the Mensheviks; many Bolsheviks refused, and both groups attended the Third RSDLP Congress, held in London in April 1905 at the Brotherhood Church. Lenin presented many of his ideas in the pamphlet Two Tactics of Social Democracy in the Democratic Revolution, published in August 1905. Here, he predicted that Russia's liberal bourgeoisie would be sated by a transition to constitutional monarchy and thus betray the revolution; instead he argued that the proletariat would have to build an alliance with the peasantry to overthrow the Tsarist regime and establish the "provisional revolutionary democratic dictatorship of the proletariat and the peasantry."

== Start of the revolution ==
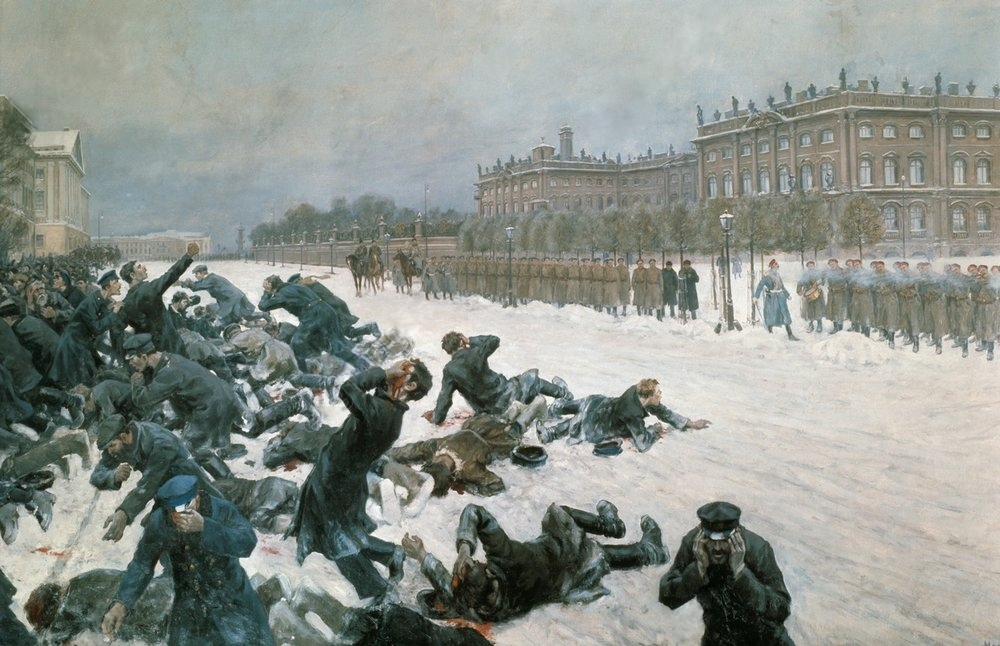
Artistic impression of Bloody Sunday in St. Petersburg

In December 1904, a strike occurred at the Putilov plant (a railway and artillery supplier) in St. Petersburg. Sympathy strikes in other parts of the city raised the number of strikers to 150,000 workers in 382 factories. By 21 January [O.S. 8 January] 1905, the city had no electricity and newspaper distribution was halted. All public areas were declared closed.

Controversial Orthodox priest Georgy Gapon, who headed a police-sponsored workers' association, led a huge workers' procession to the Winter Palace to deliver a petition to the Tsar on Sunday, 22 January [O.S. 9 January] 1905. The troops guarding the Palace were ordered to tell the demonstrators not to pass a certain point, according to Sergei Witte, and at some point, troops opened fire on the demonstrators, causing between 200 (according to Witte) and 1,000 deaths. The event became known as Bloody Sunday, and is considered by many scholars as the start of the active phase of the revolution.

The events in St. Petersburg provoked public indignation and a series of massive strikes that spread quickly throughout the industrial centers of the Russian Empire. Polish socialists—both the PPS and the SDKPiL—called for a general strike. By the end of January 1905, over 400,000 workers in Russian Poland were on strike (see Revolution in the Kingdom of Poland (1905–1907)). Half of European Russia's industrial workers went on strike in 1905, and 93.2% in Poland. There were also strikes in Finland and the Baltic coast. In Riga, 130 protesters were killed on 26 January [O.S. 13 January] 1905, and in Warsaw a few days later over 100 strikers were shot on the streets. By February, there were strikes in the Caucasus, and by April, in the Urals and beyond. In March, all higher academic institutions were forcibly closed for the remainder of the year, adding radical students to the striking workers. A strike by railway workers on 21 October [O.S. 8 October] 1905 quickly developed into a general strike in Saint Petersburg and Moscow. This prompted the setting up of the short-lived Saint Petersburg Soviet of Workers' Delegates, an admixture of Bolsheviks and Mensheviks headed by Khrustalev-Nossar and despite the Iskra split would see the likes of Julius Martov and Georgi Plekhanov spar with Lenin. Leon Trotsky, who felt a strong connection to the Bolsheviki, had not given up a compromise but spearheaded strike action in over 200 factories. By 26 October [O.S. 13 October] 1905, over 2 million workers were on strike and there were almost no active railways in all of Russia. Growing inter-ethnic confrontation throughout the Caucasus resulted in Armenian–Tatar massacres, heavily damaging the cities and the Baku oilfields.

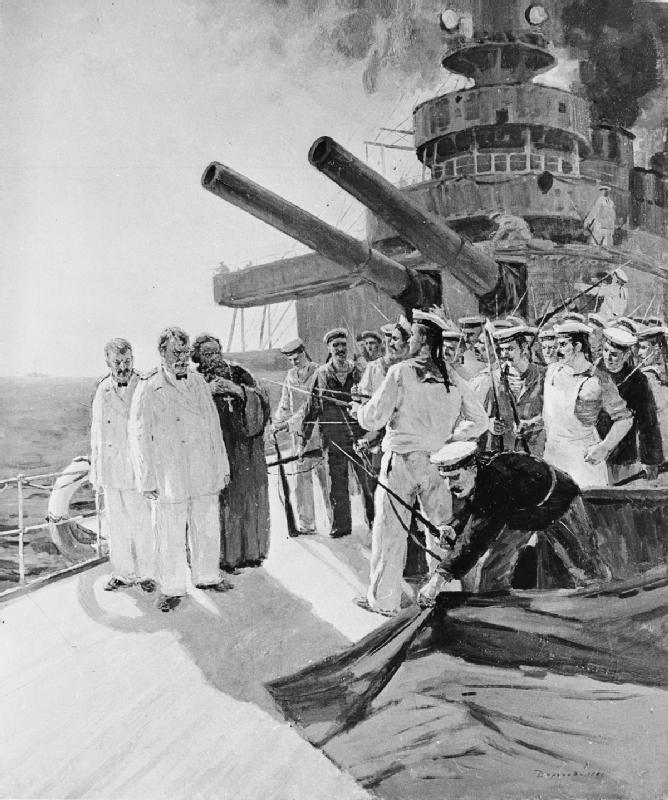
Artistic impression of the mutiny by the crew of the battleship Potemkin against the ship's officers on 14 June 1905

With the unsuccessful and bloody Russo-Japanese War (1904–1905) there was unrest in army reserve units. On 2 January 1905, Port Arthur was lost; in February 1905, the Russian army was defeated at Mukden, losing almost 80,000 men. On 27–28 May 1905, the Russian Baltic Fleet was defeated at Tsushima. Witte was dispatched to make peace, negotiating the Treaty of Portsmouth (signed 5 September [O.S. 23 August] 1905). In 1905, there were naval mutinies at Sevastopol (see Sevastopol Uprising), Vladivostok, and Kronstadt, peaking in June with the mutiny aboard the battleship Potemkin. The mutineers eventually surrendered the battleship to Romanian authorities on 8 July in exchange for asylum, then the Romanians returned her to Imperial Russian authorities on the following day. Some sources claim over 2,000 sailors died in the suppression. The mutinies were disorganised and quickly crushed. Despite these mutinies, the armed forces largely remained loyal, if dissatisfied—and were widely used by the government to control the 1905 unrest.

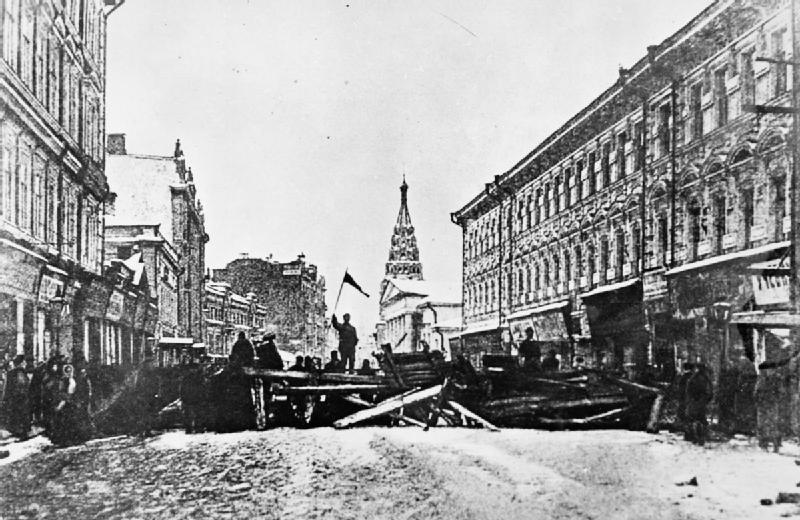
A barricade erected by revolutionaries in Moscow during Moscow uprising of 1905

Nationalist groups had been angered by the Russification undertaken since Alexander II. The Poles, Finns, and the Baltic provinces all sought autonomy, and also freedom to use their national languages and promote their own culture. Muslim groups were also active, founding the Union of the Muslims of Russia in August 1905. Certain groups took the opportunity to settle differences with each other rather than the government. Some nationalists undertook anti-Jewish pogroms, possibly with government aid, and in total over 3,000 Jews were killed.

The number of prisoners throughout the Russian Empire, which had peaked at 116,376 in 1893, fell by over a third to a record low of 75,009 in January 1905, chiefly because of several mass amnesties granted by the Tsar; the historian S G Wheatcroft has wondered what role these released criminals played in the 1905–06 social unrest.

=== Government response ===
On 12 January 1905, the Tsar appointed Dmitri Feodorovich Trepov as governor in St Petersburg and dismissed the Minister of the Interior, Pyotr Sviatopolk-Mirsky, on 18 February [O.S. 5 February] 1905. He appointed a government commission "to enquire without delay into the causes of discontent among the workers in the city of St Petersburg and its suburbs" in view of the strike movement. The commission was headed by Senator Nikolay Shidlovsky, a member of the State Council, and included officials, chiefs of government factories, and private factory owners. It was also meant to have included workers' delegates elected according to a two-stage system. Elections of the workers delegates were, however, blocked by the socialists who wanted to divert the workers from the elections to the armed struggle. On 5 March [O.S. 20 February] 1905, the commission was dissolved without having started work. Following the assassination of his uncle, the Grand Duke Sergei Aleksandrovich, on 17 February [O.S. 4 February] 1905, the Tsar made new concessions. On 2 March [O.S. 17 February] 1905 he published the Bulygin Rescript, which promised the formation of a consultative assembly, religious tolerance, freedom of speech (in the form of language rights for the Polish minority) and a reduction in the peasants' redemption payments. On 24 and 25 May [O.S. 11 and 12 May] 1905, about 300 Zemstvo and municipal representatives held three meetings in Moscow, which passed a resolution, asking for popular representation at the national level. On 6 June [O.S. 24 May] 1905, Nicholas II had received a Zemstvo deputation. Responding to speeches by Prince Sergei Nikolaevich Trubetskoy and Mr Fyodrov, the Tsar confirmed his promise to convene an assembly of people's representatives.

== Height of the revolution ==
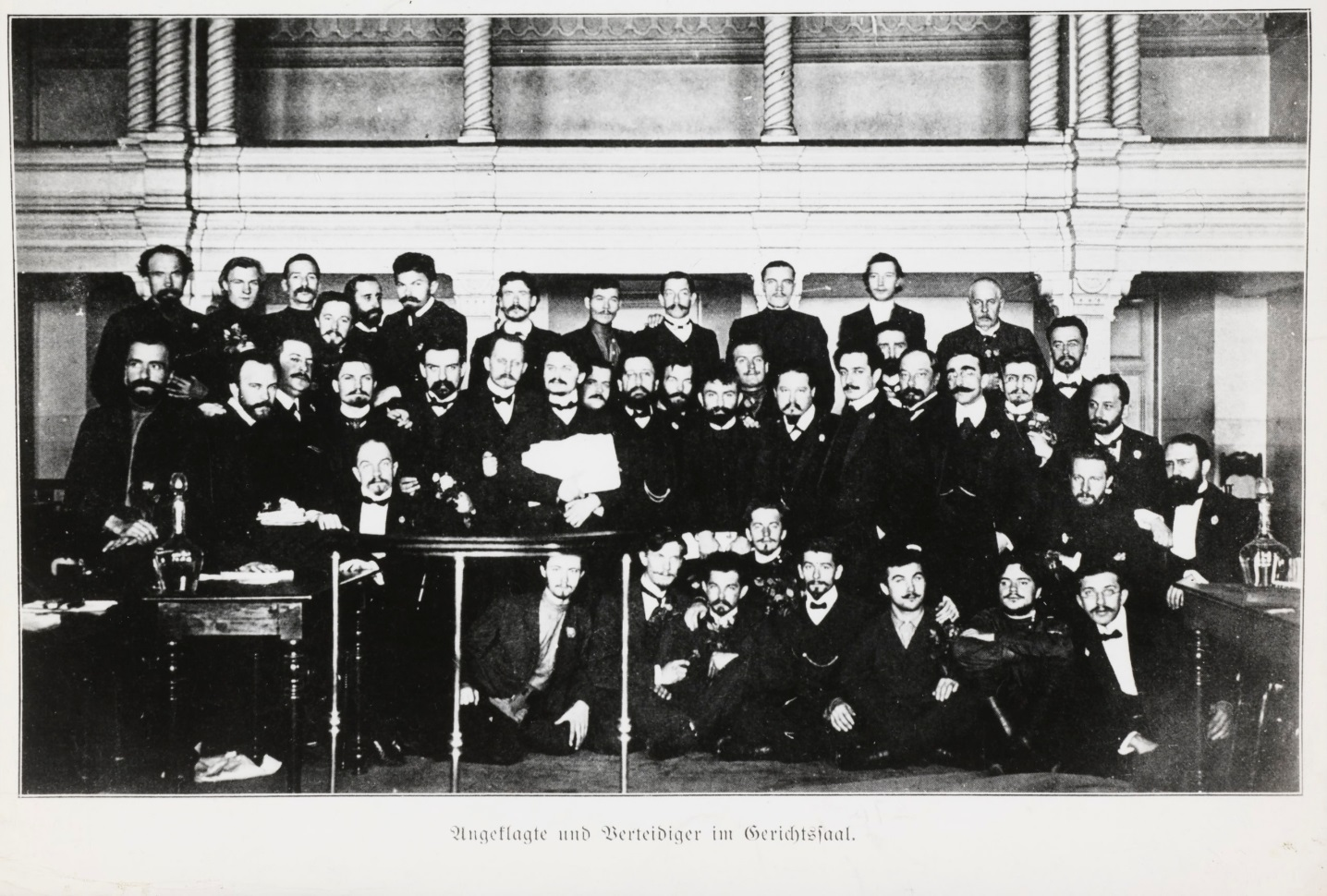
The Soviet of Workers' Deputies of St. Petersburg in 1905, Trotsky in the center. The soviets were an early example of a workers council.

Tsar Nicholas II agreed on 2 March [O.S. 18 February] to the creation of a State Duma of the Russian Empire but with consultative powers only. When its slight powers and limits on the electorate were revealed, unrest redoubled. The Saint Petersburg Soviet was formed and called for a general strike in October, refusal to pay taxes, and the en masse withdrawal of bank deposits.

In June and July 1905, there were many peasant uprisings in which peasants seized land and tools. Disturbances in the Russian-controlled Congress Poland culminated in June 1905 in the Łódź insurrection. Surprisingly, only one landlord was recorded as killed. Far more violence was inflicted on peasants outside the commune: 50 deaths were recorded. Anti-tsarist protests displaced onto Jewish communities in the October 1905 Kishinev pogrom.

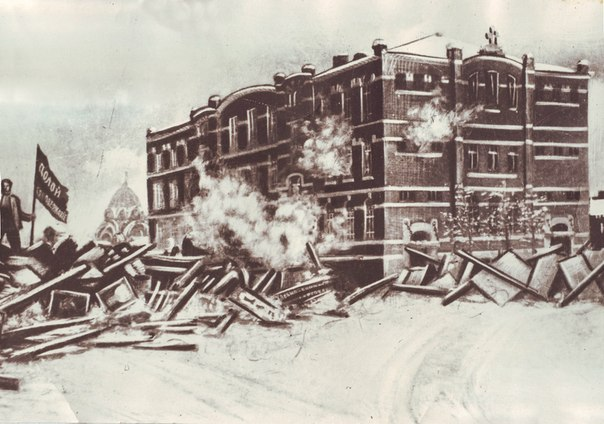
Barricades in Nizhny Novgorod, during the December uprising of 1905

The October Manifesto, written by Sergei Witte and Alexis Obolenskii, was presented to the Tsar on 14 October [O.S. 1 October]. It closely followed the demands of the Zemstvo Congress in September, granting basic civil rights, allowing the formation of political parties, extending the franchise towards universal suffrage, and establishing the Duma as the central legislative body.

The Tsar waited and argued for three days, but finally signed the manifesto on 30 October [O.S. 17 October] 1905, citing his desire to avoid a massacre and his realisation that there was insufficient military force available to pursue alternative options. He regretted signing the document, saying that he felt "sick with shame at this betrayal of the dynasty ... the betrayal was complete".

When the manifesto was proclaimed, there were spontaneous demonstrations of support in all the major cities. The strikes in Saint Petersburg and elsewhere officially ended or quickly collapsed. A political amnesty was also offered. The concessions came hand-in-hand with renewed, and brutal, action against the unrest. There was also a backlash from the conservative elements of society, with right-wing attacks on strikers, left-wingers, and Jews.

While the Russian liberals were satisfied by the October Manifesto and prepared for upcoming Duma elections, radical socialists and revolutionaries denounced the elections and called for an armed uprising to destroy the Empire.

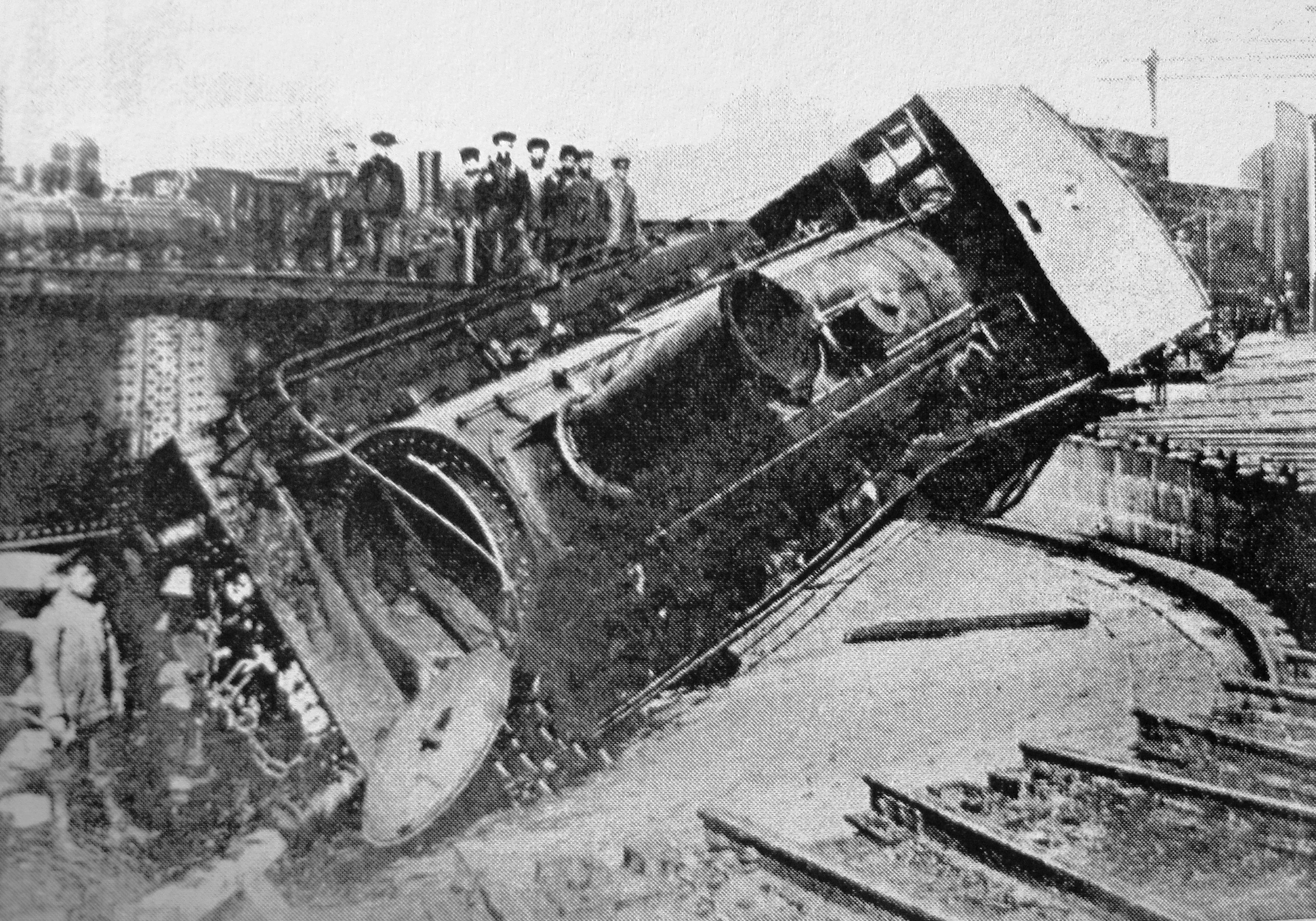
A locomotive overturned by striking workers at the main railway depot in Tiflis in 1905

Some of the November uprising of 1905 in Sevastopol, headed by retired naval Lieutenant Pyotr Schmidt, was directed against the government, while some was undirected. It included terrorism, worker strikes, peasant unrest and military mutinies, and was only suppressed after a fierce battle. The Trans-Baikal railroad fell into the hands of striker committees and demobilised soldiers returning from Manchuria after the Russo–Japanese War. The tsar had to send a special detachment of loyal troops along the Trans-Siberian Railway to restore order.

Between 5 and 7 December [O.S. 22 and 24 November], there was a general strike by Russian workers. The government sent troops on 7 December, and a bitter street-by-street fight began. A week later, the Semyonovsky Regiment was deployed, and used artillery to break up demonstrations and to shell workers' districts. On 18 December [O.S. 5 December], with around a thousand people dead and parts of the city in ruins, the workers surrendered. After a final spasm in Moscow, the uprisings ended in December 1905. According to figures presented in the Duma by Professor Maksim Kovalevsky, by April 1906, more than 14,000 people had been executed and 75,000 imprisoned. Historian Brian Taylor states the number of deaths in the 1905 revolution was in the "thousands" and notes one source that puts the figure at over 13,000 deaths.

== Results ==
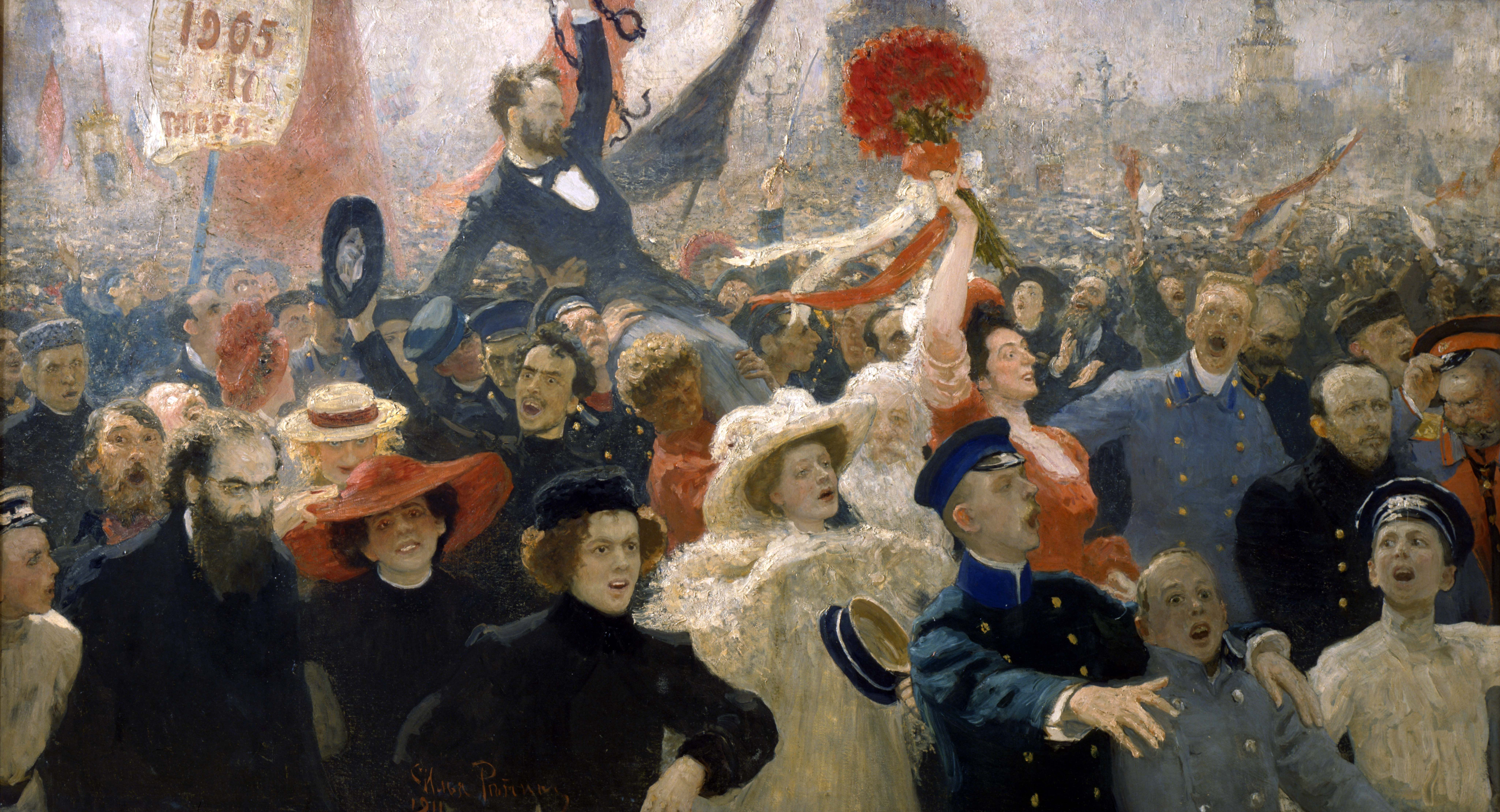
Ilya Repin, 17 October 1905. Russians celebrating the granting of the October Manifesto by Nicholas II, which led to the granting of the 1906 Constitution.

Following the Revolution of 1905, the Tsar made last attempts to save his regime, and offered reforms similar to most rulers when pressured by a revolutionary movement. The military remained loyal throughout the Revolution of 1905, as shown by their shooting of revolutionaries when ordered by the Tsar, making overthrow difficult. These reforms were outlined in a precursor to the Constitution of 1906 known as the October Manifesto which created the Imperial Duma. The Russian Constitution of 1906, also known as the Fundamental Laws, set up a multiparty system and a limited constitutional monarchy. The revolutionaries were quelled and satisfied with the reforms, but it was not enough to prevent the 1917 revolution that would later topple the Tsar's regime.

=== Creation of Duma and appointment of Stolypin ===
There had been earlier attempts in establishing a Russian Duma before the October Manifesto, but these attempts faced dogged resistance. One attempt in July 1905, called the Bulygin Duma, tried to reduce the assembly into a consultative body. It also proposed limiting voting rights to those with a higher property qualification, excluding industrial workers. Both sides—the opposition and the conservatives—were not pleased with the results. Another attempt in August 1905 was almost successful, but that too died when Nicholas insisted on the Duma's functions be relegated to an advisory position. The October Manifesto, aside from granting the population the freedom of speech and assembly, proclaimed that no law would be passed without examination and approval by the Imperial Duma. The Manifesto also extended the suffrage to universal proportions, allowing for greater participation in the Duma, though the electoral law on 11 December still excluded women. Nevertheless, the tsar retained the power of veto.

Propositions for restrictions to the Duma's legislative powers remained persistent. A decree on 20 February 1906 transformed the State Council, the advisory body, into a second chamber with legislative powers "equal to those of the Duma". Not only did this transformation violate the Manifesto, but the Council became a buffer zone between the tsar and Duma, slowing whatever progress the latter could achieve. Even three days before the Duma's first session, on 24 April 1906, the Fundamental Laws further limited the assembly's movement by giving the tsar the sole power to appoint/dismiss ministers. Adding insult was the indication that the Tsar alone had control over many facets of political reins—all without the Duma's expressed permission. The trap seemed perfectly set for the unsuspecting Duma: by the time the assembly convened on 27 April, it quickly found itself unable to do much without violating the Fundamental Laws. Defeated and frustrated, the majority of the assembly voted no confidence and handed in their resignations after a few weeks on 13 May.

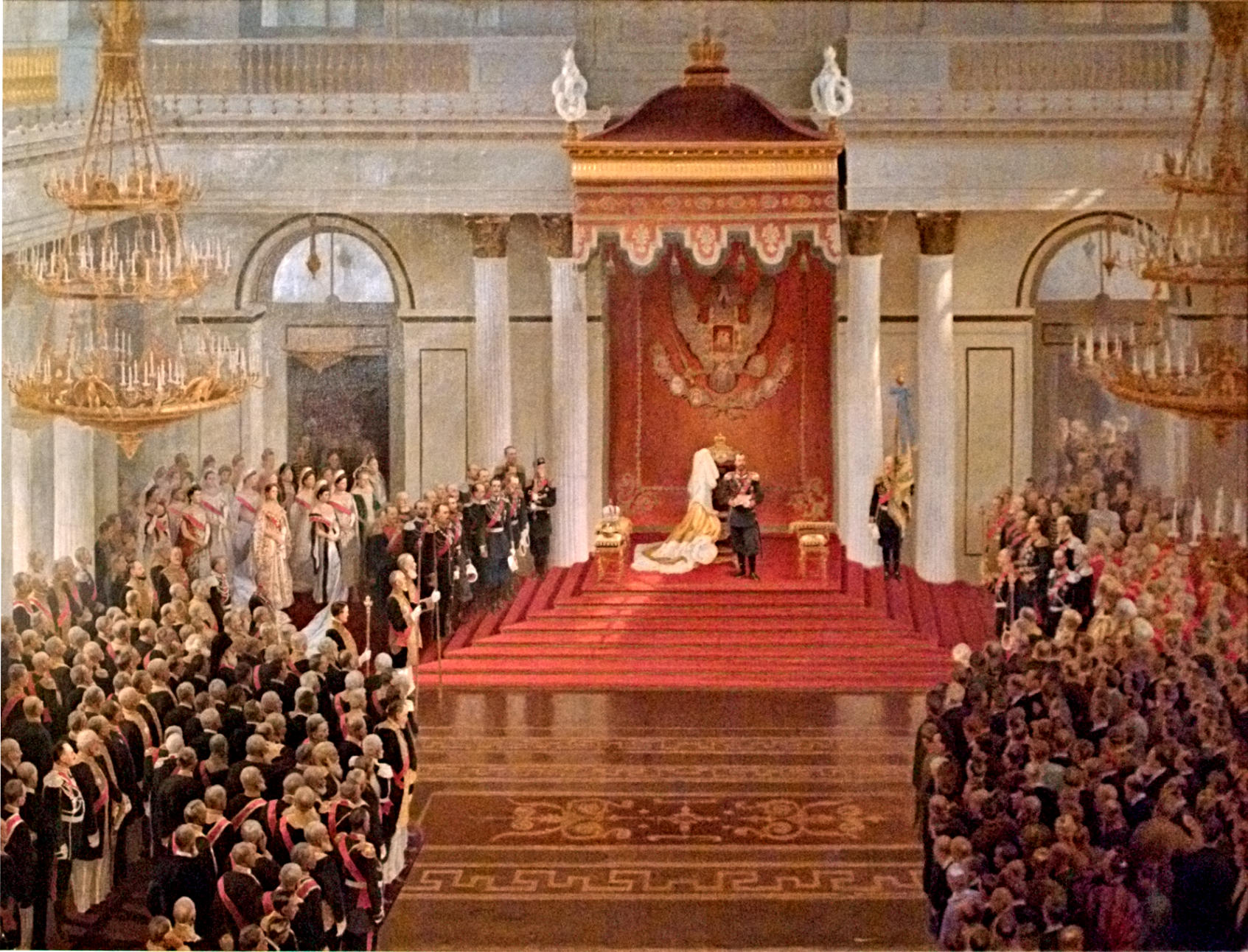
Speech by Emperor Nicholas II on the opening of the First State Duma of the Russian Empire, 27 April 1906

The attacks on the Duma were not confined to its legislative powers. By the time the Duma opened, it was missing crucial support from its populace, thanks in no small part to the government's return to Pre-Manifesto levels of suppression. The Soviets were forced to lay low for a long time, while the zemstvos turned against the Duma when the issue of land appropriation came up. The issue of land appropriation was the most contentious of the Duma's appeals. The Duma proposed that the government distribute its treasury, "monastic and imperial lands", and seize private estates as well. The Duma, in fact, was preparing to alienate some of its more affluent supporters, a decision that left the assembly without the necessary political power to be efficient.

Nicholas II remained wary of having to share power with reform-minded bureaucrats. When the pendulum in 1906 elections swung to the left, Nicholas immediately ordered the Duma's dissolution just after 73 days. Hoping to further squeeze the life out of the assembly, he appointed a tougher prime minister in Petr Stolypin as the liberal Witte's replacement. Much to Nicholas's chagrin, Stolypin attempted to bring about acts of reform (land reform), while retaining measures favorable to the regime (stepping up the number of executions of revolutionaries). After the revolution subsided, he was able to bring economic growth back to Russia's industries, a period which lasted until 1914. But Stolypin's efforts did nothing to prevent the collapse of the monarchy, nor seemed to satisfy the conservatives. Stolypin died from a bullet wound, fired by a revolutionary, Dmitry Bogrov, on 5 September 1911.

=== October Manifesto ===
Even after Bloody Sunday and defeat in the Russo-Japanese War, Nicholas II had been slow to offer a meaningful solution to the social and political crisis. At this point, he became more concerned with his personal affairs such as the illness of his son, whose struggle with haemophilia was overseen by Rasputin. Nicholas also refused to believe that the population was demanding changes in the autocratic regime, seeing "public opinion" as mainly the "intelligentsia" and believing himself to be the patronly 'father figure' to the Russian people. Sergei Witte, the minister of Russia, frustratedly argued with the Tsar that an immediate implementation of reforms was needed to retain order in the country. It was only after the Revolution started picking up steam that Nicholas was forced to make concessions by writing the October Manifesto.

Issued on 17 October 1905, the Manifesto stated that the government would grant the population reforms such as the right to vote and to convene in assemblies. Its main provisions were:

1. The granting of the population "inviolable personal rights" including freedom of conscience, speech, and assemblage
2. Giving the population who were previously cut off from doing so participation in the newly formed Duma
3. Ensuring that no law would be passed without the consent of the Imperial Duma.

Despite what seemed to be a moment for celebration for Russia's population and the reformists, the Manifesto was rife with problems. Aside from the absence of the word "constitution", one issue with the manifesto was its timing. By October 1905, Nicholas was already dealing with a revolution. Another problem surfaced in the conscience of Nicholas himself: Witte said in 1911 that the manifesto was written only to get the pressure off the monarch's back, that it was not a "voluntary act". In fact, the writers hoped that the Manifesto would sow discord into "the camp of the autocracy's enemies" and bring order back to Russia.

One immediate effect it did have, for a while, was the start of the Days of Freedom, a six-week period from 17 October to early December. This period witnessed an unprecedented level of freedom on all publications—revolutionary papers, brochures, etc.—even though the tsar officially retained the power to censor provocative material. This opportunity allowed the press to address the tsar, and government officials, in a harsh, critical tone previously unheard of. The freedom of speech also opened the floodgates for meetings and organised political parties. In Moscow alone, over 400 meetings took place in the first four weeks. Some of the political parties that came out of these meetings were the Constitutional Democrats (Kadets), Social Democrats, Socialist Revolutionaries, Octobrists, and the far-rightist Union of the Russian People.

Among all the groups that benefited most from the Days of Freedoms were the labour unions. In fact, the Days of Freedom witnessed unionisation in the history of the Russian Empire at its apex. At least 67 unions were established in Moscow, as well as 58 in St. Petersburg; the majority of both combined were formed in November 1905 alone. For the Soviets, it was a watershed period of time: nearly 50 of the unions in St. Petersburg came under Soviet control, while in Moscow, the Soviets had around 80,000 members. This large sector of power allowed the Soviets enough clout to form their own militias. In St. Petersburg alone, the Soviets claimed around 6,000 armed members with the purpose of protecting the meetings.

Perhaps empowered in their newfound window of opportunity, the St. Petersburg Soviets, along with other socialist parties, called for armed struggles against the Tsarist government, a war call that no doubt alarmed the government. Not only were the workers motivated, but the Days of Freedom also had an earthquake-like effect on the peasant collective as well. Seeing an opening in the autocracy's waning authority thanks to the Manifesto, the peasants, with a political organisation, took to the streets in revolt. In response, the government exerted its forces in campaigns to subdue and repress both the peasants and the workers. Consequences were now in full force: with a pretext in their hands, the government spent the month of December 1905 regaining the level of authority once lost to Bloody Sunday.

Ironically, the writers of the October Manifesto were caught off guard by the surge in revolts. One of the main reasons for writing the October Manifesto bordered on the government's "fear of the revolutionary movement". In fact, many officials believed this fear was practically the sole reason for the Manifesto's creation in the first place. Among those more scared was Dmitri Feodorovich Trepov, governor general of St. Petersburg and deputy minister of the interior. Trepov urged Nicholas II to stick to the principles in the Manifesto, for "every retreat ... would be hazardous to the dynasty".

=== Russian Constitution of 1906 ===
The Russian Constitution of 1906 was published on the eve of the convocation of the First Duma. The new Fundamental Law was enacted to institute promises of the October Manifesto as well as add new reforms. The Tsar was confirmed as absolute leader, with complete control of the executive, foreign policy, church, and the armed forces. The structure of the Duma was changed, becoming a lower chamber below the Council of Ministers, and was half-elected, half-appointed by the Tsar. Legislations had to be approved by the Duma, the council, and the Tsar to become law. The Fundamental State Laws were the "culmination of the whole sequence of events set in motion in October 1905 and which consolidated the new status quo". The introduction of The Russian Constitution of 1906 was not simply an institution of the October Manifesto. The introduction of the constitution states (and thus emphasizes) the following:

- The Russian State is one and indivisible.
- The Grand Duchy of Finland, while comprising an inseparable part of the Russian State, is governed in its internal affairs by special decrees based on special legislation.
- The Russian language is the common language of the state, and its use is compulsory in the army, the navy and all state and public institutions. The use of local (regional) languages and dialects in state and public institutions are determined by special legislation.

The Constitution did not mention any of the provisions of the October Manifesto. While it did enact the provisions laid out previously, its sole purpose seems again to be the propaganda for the monarchy and to simply not fall back on prior promises. The provisions and the new constitutional monarchy did not satisfy Russians and Lenin. The Constitution lasted until the fall of the empire in 1917.

== Rise of political violence ==
The years 1906 and 1907 saw a decline of mass movements, strikes and protests, and a rise of overt political violence. Combat groups such as the SR Combat Organization carried out many assassinations targeting civil servants and police, and robberies. Between 1906 and 1909, revolutionaries killed 7,293 people, of whom 2,640 were officials, and wounded 8,061. Notable victims included:

- Nikolai Bobrikov – Governor-General of Finland. Killed 17 June [O.S. 4 June] 1904 in Helsinki (attack on 16 June).
- Vyacheslav von Plehve – Minister of Interior. Killed 28 July [O.S. 15 July] 1904 in Saint Petersburg.
- Grand Duke Sergei Alexandrovich of Russia – Killed 17 February [O.S. 4 February] 1905 in Moscow.
- Eliel Soisalon-Soininen – Procurator of Justice of Finland. Killed 19 February [O.S. 6 February] 1905 in Helsinki.
- Viktor Sakharov – former war minister. Killed 5 December [O.S. 22 November] 1905 in Saratov
- Admiral Chukhnin – the commander of the Black Sea Fleet. Killed 11 July [O.S. 28 June] 1906 in Sevastopol
- Aleksey Ignatyev – Killed 22 December [O.S. 9 December] 1906 in Tver

== Repression ==
The years of revolution were marked by a dramatic rise in the numbers of death sentences and executions. Different figures on the number of executions were compared by Senator Nikolai Tagantsev, and are listed in the table.

Year	Number of executions by different accounts			
Year	Report by Ministry of Internal Affairs Police Department to the State Duma on 19 February [O.S. 6 February] 1909	Report by Ministry of War Military Justice department	By Oscar Gruzenberg	Report by Mikhail Borovitinov, assistant head of Ministry of Justice Chief Prison Administration, at the International Prison Congress in Washington, 1910.
1905	10	19	26	20
1906	144	236	225	144
1907	456	627	624	1,139
1908	825	1,330	1,349	825
Total	1,435 + 683 = 2,118	2,212	2,235	2,128

Year	Number of executions
1909	537
1910	129
1911	352
1912	123
1913	25

These numbers reflect only executions of civilians, and do not include a large number of summary executions by punitive army detachments and executions of military mutineers. Peter Kropotkin, an anarchist, noted that official statistics excluded executions conducted during punitive expeditions, especially in Siberia, Caucasus and the Baltic provinces. By 1906 some 4,509 political prisoners were incarcerated in Russian Poland, 20 percent of the empire's total.

== Regional and national developments ==
=== Ivanovo Soviet ===
Ivanovo Voznesensk was known as the 'Russian Manchester' for its textile mills. In 1905, its local revolutionaries were overwhelmingly Bolshevik. It was the first Bolshevik branch in which workers outnumbered intellectuals.

- 11 May 1905: The 'Group', the revolutionary leadership, called for the workers at all the textile mills to strike.
- 12 May: The strike begins. Strike leaders meet in the local woods.
- 13 May: 40,000 workers assemble before the Administration Building to give Svirskii, the regional factory inspector, a list of demands.
- 14 May: Workers' delegates are elected. Svirskii had suggested they do so, as he wanted people to negotiate with. A mass meeting is held in Administration Square. Svirskii tells them the mill owners will not meet their demands but will negotiate with elected mill delegates, who will be immune to prosecution, according to the governor.
- 15 May: Svirskii tells the strikers they can negotiate only about each factory in turn, but they can hold elections wherever. The strikers elect delegates to represent each mill while they are still out in the streets. Later the delegates elect a chairman.
- 17 May: The meetings are moved to the bank of the Talka River, on suggestion by the police chief.
- 27 May: The delegates' meeting house is closed.
- 3 June: Cossacks break up a workers' meeting, arresting over 20 men. Workers start sabotaging telephone wires and burn down a mill.
- 9 June: The police chief resigns.
- 12 June: All prisoners are released. Most mill owners flee to Moscow. Neither side gives in.
- 27 June: Workers agree to stop striking 1 July.

=== Ukraine ===
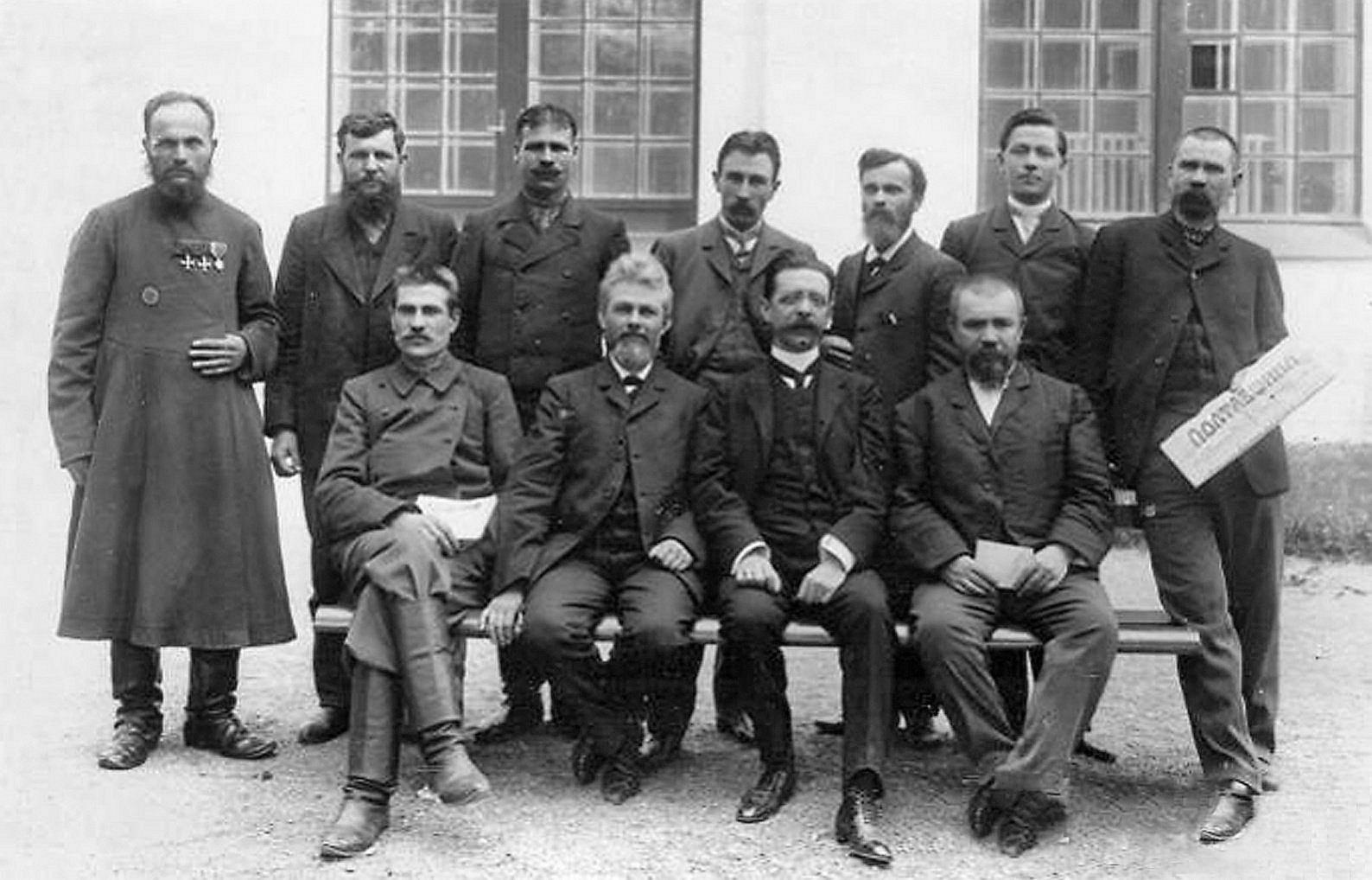
Members of the State Duma from Poltava Governorate in 1906

In Ukrainian-populated areas of the Russian Empire, the revolutionary democratic movement of 1905 also assumed a national form. After three decades of repression, that year saw the emergence of Ukrainian-language press in cities like Kyiv, Kharkiv, Odessa, Yekaterinoslav and Poltava. In 1905 alone, 34 Ukrainian newspapers were founded, and numerous publishing houses emerged. As a result of the revolution, Prosvita established its branches in Kyiv and several other cities, meanwhile zemstvo institutions and cooperative organizations increasingly paid attention to the issues of popular education. During that same year, the Petrograd Academy of Sciences officially recognized Ukrainian as a distinct language rather than a dialect of Russian.

In the First Duma, a Ukrainian Club consisting of 44 deputies was established, supporting a program of land redistribution among peasants and promoting elements of national autonomy for Ukrainians living in the empire. In the Second Duma the membership of the Ukrainian Club grew to 47 deputies. However, following the adoption of Stolypin's new electoral law in 1907, pro-autonomy Ukrainian deputies were eliminated from the Duma, which allowed the government to repress Ukrainian publications and civic organizations, and studying of Ukrainian language was once again removed from schools. Nevertheless, the new wave of persecution failed to destroy the Ukrainian national movement, and instead made it more radical.

The Revolution of 1905 also had effects on Ukrainians in Austrian Galicia, who were able to establish their own Ukrainian Club in the Reichsrat following the introduction of universal suffrage in 1907.

=== Poland ===
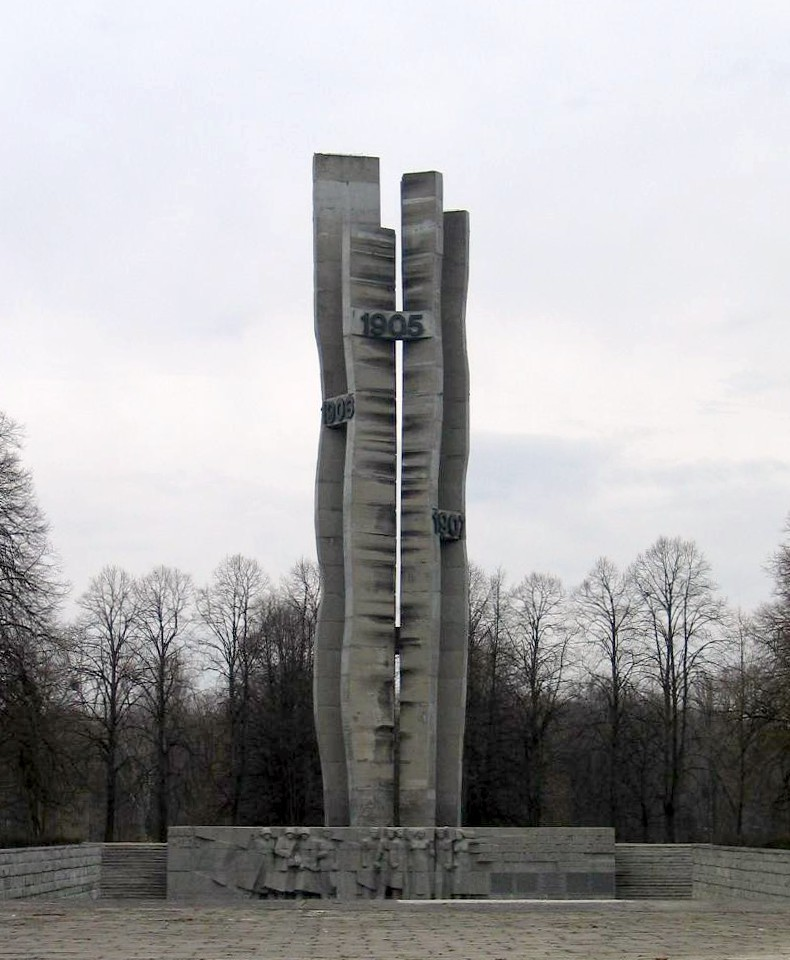
Łódź monument to the 1905 insurrection

The 1905–1907 revolution was at the time the largest wave of strikes and widest emancipatory movement Poland had ever seen, and it would remain so until the 1970s and 1980s. In 1905, 93.2% of Congress Poland's industrial workers went on strike. The first phase of the revolution consisted primarily of mass strikes, rallies, demonstrations—later this evolved into street skirmishes with the police and army as well as bomb assassinations and robberies of transports carrying money to tsarist financial institutions.

One of the major events of that period was the insurrection in Łódź in June 1905, but unrest happened in many other areas too. Warsaw was also an active centre of resistance, particularly in terms of strikes, whereas further south the Republika Ostrowiecka and Republika Zagłębiowska were proclaimed (tsarist control was later restored in these areas when martial law was introduced). Until November 1905, Poland was at the vanguard of the revolutionary movement in the Russian Empire despite the vast military numbers thrown against it; even when the upheaval began its downfall, larger strikes happened more often in Poland than they did in other parts of the Empire in the years 1906–1907.

Due to its reach, violence, radicalism, and effects, some Polish historians even consider the events of the 1905 revolution in Poland a fourth Polish uprising against the Russian Empire. Rosa Luxemburg described Poland as "one of the most explosive centres of the revolutionary movement" which "in 1905 marched at the head of the Russian Revolution".

=== Finland ===
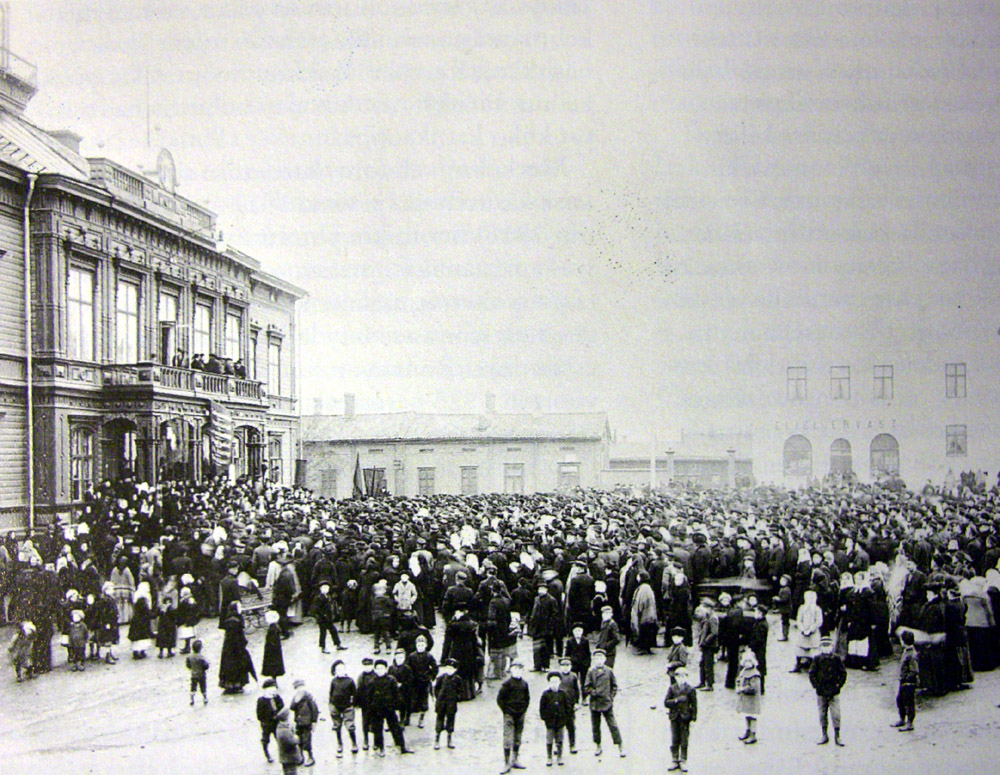
Demonstrators in Jakobstad

In the Grand Duchy of Finland, the Social Democrats organised the general strike of 1905 (30 October – 6 November [O.S. 17–24 October]). The Red Guards were formed, led by captain Johan Kock. During the general strike, the Red Declaration, written by Finnish politician and journalist Yrjö Mäkelin, was published in Tampere, demanding dissolution of the Senate of Finland, universal suffrage, political freedoms, and abolition of censorship. Leo Mechelin, leader of the constitutionalists, crafted the November Manifesto: the revolution resulted in the abolition of the Diet of Finland and of the four Estates, and to the creation of the modern Parliament of Finland. It also resulted in a temporary halt to the Russification policy that Russia had started in 1899.

On 30 July [O.S. 17 July] 1906, Russian artillerymen and military engineers rose in revolt in the fortress of Sveaborg (later called Suomenlinna), Helsinki. The Finnish Red Guards supported the Sveaborg Rebellion with a general strike, but the mutiny was quelled within 60 hours by loyal troops and ships of the Baltic Fleet.

=== Estonia ===
In the Governorate of Estonia, Estonians called for freedom of the press and assembly, for universal suffrage, and for national autonomy. On 29 October [O.S. 16 October], the Russian army opened fire in a meeting on a street market in Tallinn in which about 8 000–10 000 people participated, killing 94 and injuring over 200. The October Manifesto was supported in Estonia and the Estonian flag was displayed publicly for the first time. Jaan Tõnisson used the new political freedoms to widen the rights of Estonians by establishing the first Estonian political party – National Progress Party.

Another, more radical political organisation, the Estonian Social Democratic Workers' Union was founded as well. The moderate supporters of Tõnisson and the more radical supporters of Jaan Teemant could not agree about how to continue with the revolution, and only agreed that both wanted to limit the rights of Baltic Germans and to end Russification. The radical views were publicly welcomed and in December 1905, martial law was declared in Tallinn. A total of 160 manors were looted, resulting in ca. 400 workers and peasants being killed by the army. Estonian gains from the revolution were minimal, but the tense stability that prevailed between 1905 and 1917 allowed Estonians to advance the aspiration of national statehood.

=== Latvia ===
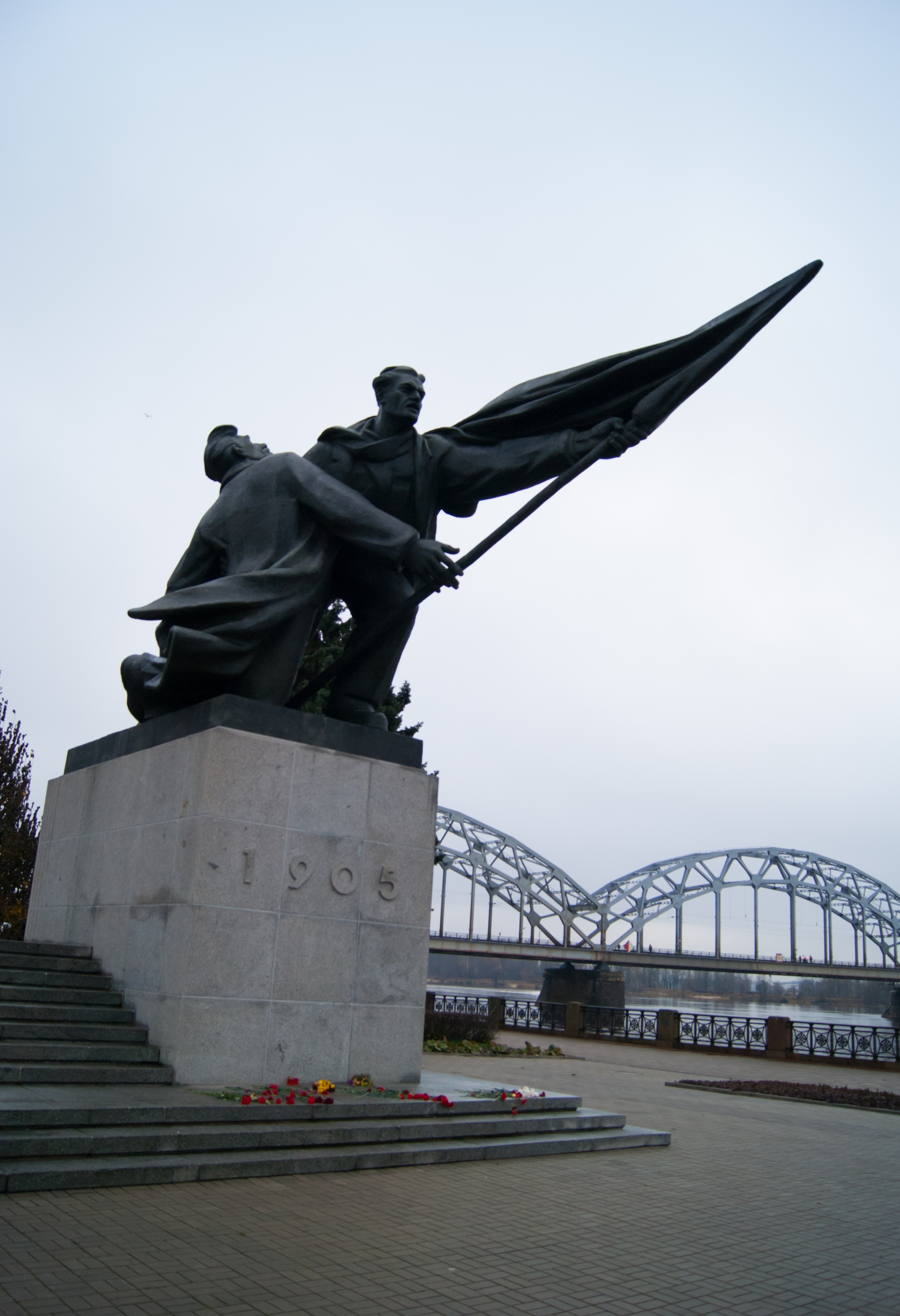
Bloody Sunday Monument in Riga on the Daugava

Following the shooting of demonstrators in St. Petersburg, a wide-scale general strike began in Riga. On 26 January [O.S. 13 January], Russian army troops opened fire on demonstrators killing 73 and injuring 200 people. During the middle of 1905, the focus of revolutionary events moved to the countryside with mass meetings and demonstrations. 470 new parish administrative bodies were elected in 94% of the parishes in Latvia. The Congress of Parish Representatives was held in Riga in November. In autumn 1905, armed conflict between the Baltic German nobility and the Latvian peasants began in the rural areas of Livonia and Courland. In Courland, the peasants seized or surrounded several towns. In Livonia, the fighters controlled the Rūjiena-Pärnu railway line. Martial law was declared in Courland in August 1905, and in Livonia in late November. Special punitive expeditions were dispatched in mid-December to suppress the movement. They executed 1170 people without trial or investigation and burned 300 peasant homes. Thousands were exiled to Siberia. Many Latvian intellectuals only escaped by fleeing to Western Europe or US. In 1906, the revolutionary movement gradually subsided.

== Cultural portrayal ==
- Artists Valentin Serov, Boris Kustodiev, Ivan Bilibin and Mstislav Dobuzhinsky published their works dedicated to the 1905 Revolution in the satirical magazine Zhupel.
- Novels Mother (1907) by Maxim Gorky and The Silver Dove (1909) by Andrei Bely were written under the impression of the 1905 Revolution. The same authors depicted it in their later works: Andrei Bely in his Petersburg (1913/1922) and Maxim Gorky in The Life of Klim Samgin (1927–1931).
- Battleship Potemkin (1925), Sergei Eisenstein originally intended this film to be a pro-Bolshevik narrative of the 1905 Russian Revolution.
- Doctor Zhivago, a 1957 novel by Boris Pasternak which takes place from the years between 1902 and World War II.
- Symphony No. 11 (Shostakovich), subtitled The Year 1905, written in 1957.
- Rouletabille chez le Tsar, also known as The Secret of the Night, was the third novel of Gaston Leroux's popular Rouletabille detective series set in 1905 during the revolution and drew upon Leroux's own experience reporting on the event as a journalist for France's Le Matin magazine.

== See also ==
- Bibliography of the Russian Revolution and Civil War § The Revolution of 1905
- Outline of the Russian Revolutions of 1905 and 1917 and Civil War
- 1905 (Trotsky book)
- David Shub
- Bourgeois revolution
- Russian Revolution of 1917
- Gurian Republic
- Riga expedition (1905)
