= Matti Kurikka =

Finnish journalist

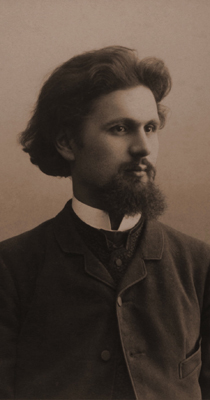
Matti Kurikka

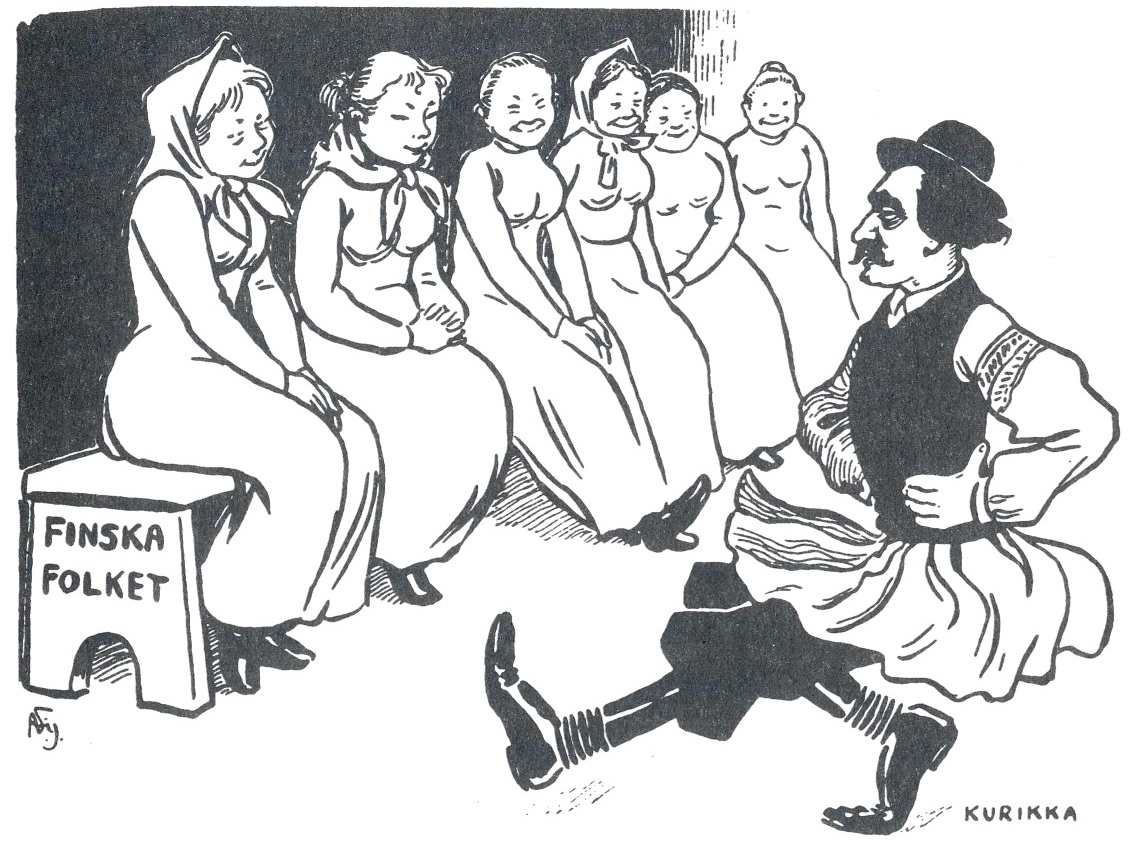
Political caricature: Matti Kurikka dancing Russian Trepak before Finnish folk

Matti Kurikka (January 24, 1863 Maloye Karlino, Tsarskoselsky Uyezd, Saint Petersburg Governorate, historical Ingria – October 4, 1915 Westerly, Rhode Island, United States) was a Finnish journalist, theosophist, and utopian socialist.

Kurikka was the editor of the newspaper Työmies from 1897 to 1899. In 1908 Kurikka purchased the newspaper Wiipurin Sanomat. As editor of Wiipurin Sanomat, Kurikka was initially influenced by the Young Finns' political movement, later moving towards Christian socialism. Kurikka moved to North America in 1900 and founded the newspaper Aika, the first Finnish-Canadian newspaper.

In 1901 Kurikka helped establish Sointula, a utopian island colony on Malcolm Island, British Columbia, based on cooperative principles. Sointula dissolved as a utopian colony in 1905 due to financial difficulties and a devastating fire, but continued as a fishing and logging-based community. Kurikka had attempted to found utopian communities in Chillagoe, Queensland, Australia, and in Canada prior to Sointula.

Kurikka died in Westerly, Rhode Island in 1915. Shortly before his own death, Matti Kurikka delivered the eulogy at Finnish revolutionary Johan Kock's funeral.
