= Sergey Tsion =

Russian revolutionary (1874–1947)

Sergei Anatoljevich Tsion
- Сергей Анатолиевич Цион
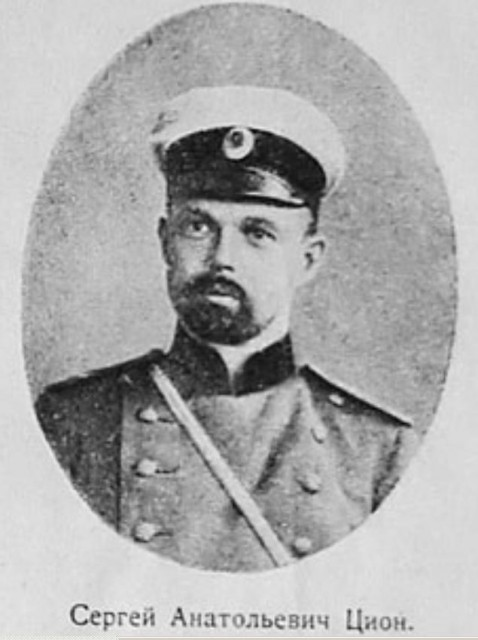
- Sergei Tsion in 1906
- Born: 1874; Russian Empire
- Died: 1947 (aged 72–73); Stockholm
- Occupation: Military man

Sergei Anatoljevich Tsion (Russian: Сергей Анатолиевич Цион; 1874–1947) was an Imperial Russian Army captain who was one of the leaders of the Sveaborg Rebellion in 1906.

== Life ==
=== Time in Finland ===
Jewish-born Tsion was a member of the Russian Social Democratic Labour Party's majority wing called the Bolsheviks.

In Sveaborg fortress Tsion edited the Vestnik Kasarmi magazine which also was a Finnish Social Democratic edition. During the Sveaborg Rebellion Tsion was one of rebellion leaders but didn't take part in the rebellion in Sveaborg fortress, being based in mainland Helsinki. During his time in Helsinki Tsion had contacted several Finnish social democrats including journalist-playwright Elvira Willman. After the failed rebellion other rebellion leaders were executed, but Tsion was able to flee to England where he worked as journalist. Helsinki-based publisher Fugas published Tsion's memoir about the Sveaborg Rebellion in 1907.

=== Return to Russia ===
Tsion returned to Russia after the February Revolution in summer 1917. He had left the Bolsheviks and joined the Socialist Revolutionary Party and was the supporter of the Provisional Government's leader Aleksandr Kerensky. Tsion travelled to Saint Petersburg via Helsinki. After the October Revolution, in which the Bolsheviks took power in Russia, Tsion fled to Sweden. In Sweden Tsion worked as translator. During his time in Sweden Tsion was in correspondence with the Nobel Laureate Russian writer Ivan Bunin, who was living in exile in Grasse, France. Tsion supported Bunin during the wartime financially.
