= Johan Kock =

Finnish soldier

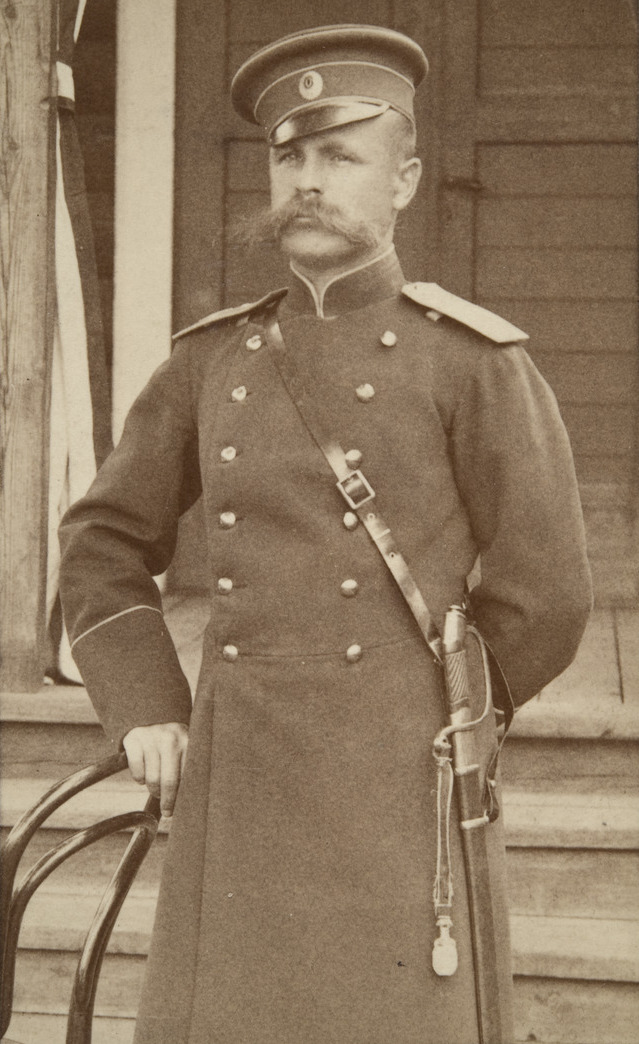
- Kock, photographed by Jules David
- Born: 4 June 1861; Helsinki, Grand Duchy of Finland
- Died: 13 April 1915 (aged 53); Fitchburg, Massachusetts, U.S.
- Military career
- Allegiance: Russian Empire
- Branch: Imperial Russian Army
- Service years: 1880's–1897
- Rank: Captain (Капитан)
- Unit: Finnish Guards' Rifle Battalion

Johan Kock (4 June 1861 – 13 April 1915) was a Finnish soldier who had been decommissioned from the Russian army in Viipuri in 1897. Kock was a revolutionary who was the leader of the Finnish Labour Corps from 1905 to 1906.

== Biography ==
Kock was born in Helsinki. In 1900 Kock was a reporter in Viipuri. He organised routes to smuggle revolutionary writings from Sweden via Finland to Russia. In 1905 during the general strike the academic society and labor protested together against Tsar Nicholas II. Kock was appointed the leader of the national guard by the strike committee. Kock gained the support and trust of the general governor Ivan Obolensky. Nevertheless, Obolensky negotiated with the Constitutionals how to solve the strike by political means. The Academic society could not accept Kock's leadership: university students and polytechniques split off, founding their own organisation under the leadership of Gösta Thörsleff.

The Constitutionals wanted to end the strike on 5 November, but the Labour Corps insisted on deciding whether to end the strike at a mass meeting of workers. Kock, who supported the strike, attended the negotiations to end the strike. The strike ended on 6 November, and on the next day Kock pulled his troops from the Helsinki police stations.

Kock took part in the Sveaborg Rebellion in 1906 in the Sveaborg fortress (renamed "Suomenlinna" in Finnish in 1918). When the rebellion failed, Kock fled the country along with other activists to Sweden and from there to the United Kingdom before moving to the United States. He died in 1915 in Fitchburg, Massachusetts. Matti Kurikka delivered the eulogy at Kock's funeral shortly before his own death.
