= Sveaborg rebellion =

1906 Russian military mutiny

- Part of the Russian Revolution of 1905
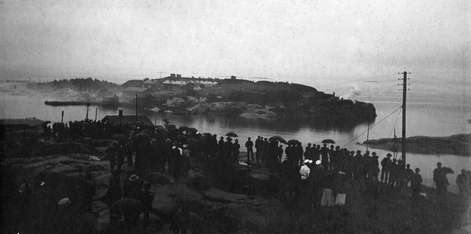
- Helsinkians watching the rebellion
Date	30 July 1906 – 2 August 1906
Location	Sveaborg (present-day Suomenlinna) and Helsinki
Result	Imperial Russian Army victory; uprising suppressed

Belligerents
Sveaborg garrison army mutineers Labour Corps	Imperial Russian Army; Russian Imperial Navy Baltic Fleet; Helsinki Civil Guard

Commanders and leaders
Sergey Tsion; Arkady Emelyanov (executed); Yevgenii Kokhanskiy (executed); Johan Kock	Vladimir Laiming; Nikolai Essen; Didrik von Essen

Strength
2,000	2,000

Casualties and losses
43 mutineers executed 127 sentenced to hard labor 735 jailed	Unknown

The Sveaborg rebellion was an Imperial Russian military mutiny which broke out on the evening of 30 July 1906 amongst the garrison of the coastal fortress of Sveaborg (now known as Suomenlinna) on the coast of Helsinki in the Grand Duchy of Finland. The mutiny was part of the aftermath of the Russian Revolution of 1905, which by summer 1906 had effectively been suppressed in most other regions of the Russian Empire.

== Background ==
The Fortress of Sveaborg had been constructed in the 18th century to provide sea defenses for Helsinki. In 1906 it was garrisoned by approximately 1,800 artillerymen, 1,500 infantrymen and 250 pioneers. The combined force of over 3,500 made up over half of the total Tsarist troops based in and around Helsinki. All of these troops were Russian as no Finnish units of the Imperial Army were stationed in the Grand Duchy.

== Leadership ==
The ringleaders of the uprising were three junior Russian officers in the garrison: Captain Sergei Tsion and Lieutenants Emelyanov and Kokhanskiy. Tsion, who was a secret Bolshevik sympathizer, had made contact with a Finnish Labour Corps leader Johan Kock. The Labour Corps were an anti-Tsarist political movement that favored social revolution in Finland. They were believed to number over 6,000 members and had, since the major disturbances of 1905 within Russia itself, been preparing for a Finnish uprising. They were, however, poorly armed and untrained.

== Mutiny ==
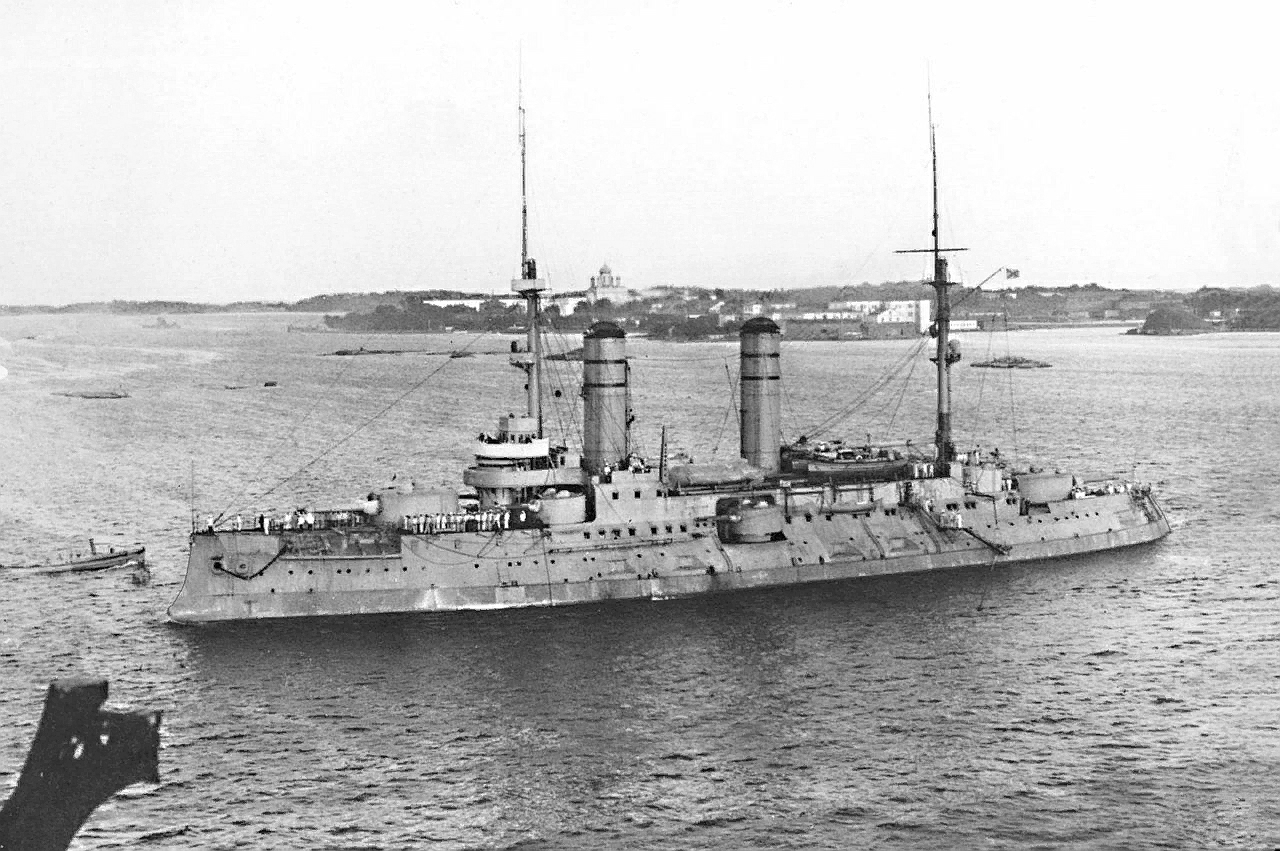
Tsesarevich helped to put the rebellion down from sea.

The mutiny broke out on the evening of 30 July, earlier than the military conspirators had planned. Poor food and the withdrawal of a special allowance had, however, sparked discontent amongst the pioneers and artillerymen of the garrison, most of whom were conscripts drawn from the industrial regions of Russia. The pioneer company was particularly unsettled and had been put under collective arrest by the general commanding the Sveaborg Fortress and neighboring outposts. In response most of the artillerymen mutinied, expelling or imprisoning their officers. By daylight on 31 July about 2,000 men had joined the mutiny. The infantry component of the garrison, drawn from rural areas and more amenable to army discipline than their radicalised counterparts in the technical branches, mostly remained loyal to their officers.

== Suppression ==
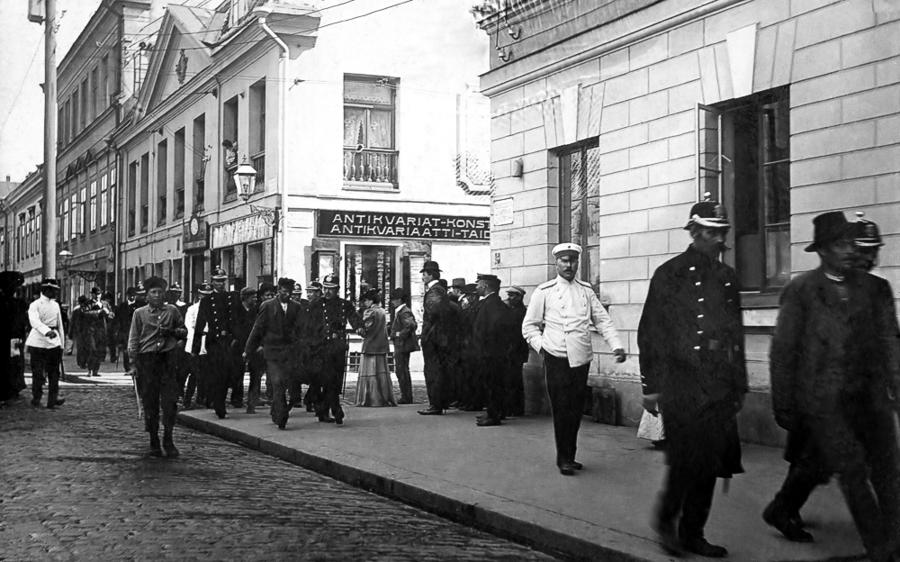
Arrested Labour Corp members in Aleksanterinkatu.

The leaders of the mutiny hoped that their example would lead to uprisings amongst the sailors of the Baltic Fleet from the naval bases at Helsinki and Kronstadt. However, the naval unrest of the previous year had now subsided and the crews of the warships close to Sveaborg showed no inclination to join the mutiny. Equally, the Cossack cavalry and the infantry units that made up the remainder of the Imperial Army forces in Finland continued to obey orders. Although the mutineers were able to capture nearby Katajanokka, the uprising quickly lost momentum. Following a naval bombardment on 1 August, the bulk of the mutinous artillerymen and pioneers surrendered to loyal troops. The mutiny had lasted only 60 hours. Emelyanv and Kokhanskiy were executed, although Tsion's fate is uncertain.

== Finnish involvement ==
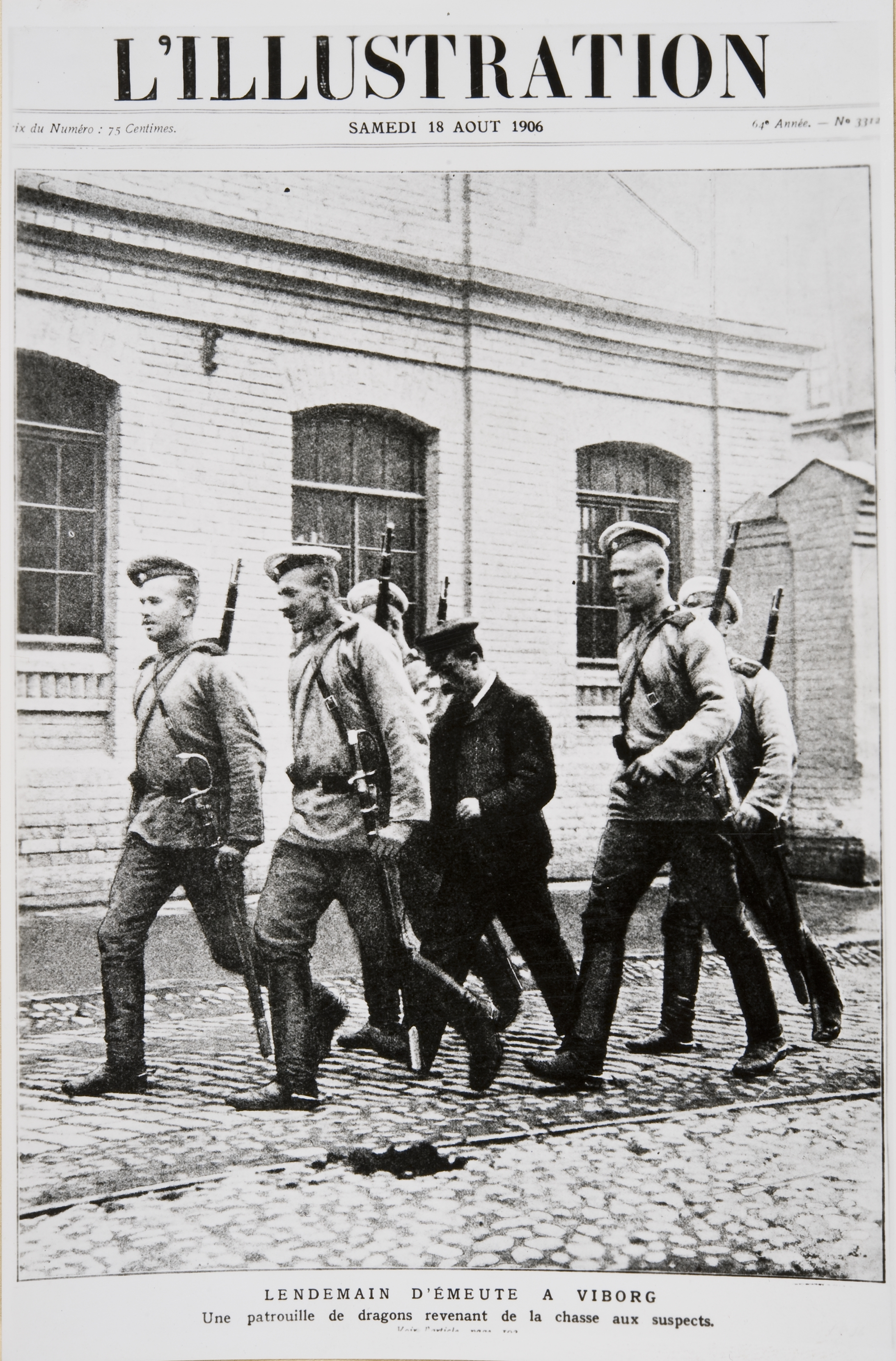
Russian gendarmes taking Red rebels as prisoners

A few hundred members of the Finnish Labour Corps had joined with the Russian mutineers and Johan Kock had called for a general strike in support of them. However, fighting broke out in Hakaniemi, between Russian sailors from the naval barracks and Finnish "Whites", acting in opposition to Kock's "Reds". There were several dozen casualties before Tsarist forces were able to restore order. Johan Kock was able to escape to Sweden and ultimately to England.

== Reasons for failure ==
In spite of the numbers involved the "Sveaborg Rebellion" proved far less of a threat to the Tsarist government than the mutinies of the previous year had done. The reasons included the indifference of the bulk of the Finnish population to any dissatisfaction within the Russian occupying forces and the fact that by August 1906 discipline and morale had been largely restored within the Tsarist army and navy.
