= Konsta Lindqvist =

Finnish politician (1877–1920)

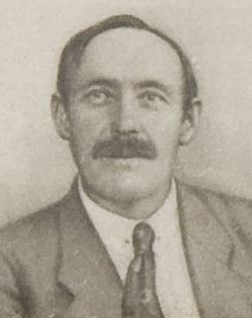
Konsta Lindqvist

Konstantin (Konsta) Evert Lindqvist (né Kraft; 26 December 1877 − 31 August 1920) was a Finnish politician. He was a member of the Social Democratic Party of Finland party and a delegate for transport in the Finnish People's Delegation the government of the Finnish Socialist Workers' Republic during the Finnish Civil War period. After the war Lindqvist fled to Soviet Russia where he was killed two years later by members of the internal opposition of the SKP.

== Life ==
Born in Kymi, Lindqvist worked in the Finnish State Railways as a locomotive engineer, driving in Kajaani from 1908–1909 and in Kuopio from 1910–1918.

Lindqvist was a member of the Parliament from 3 July to 31 October 1917, representing the Social Democratic Party of Finland and the Kuopio western constituency. Lindqvist became a member of parliament when the MP Otto Piisinen became ill and left Parliament.

Lindqvist was also district secretary of the Kajaani social democratic group and chairman of the Finnish Locomotive Drivers Union from 1917 to 1918.

He was a delegate for transport in the Finnish People's Delegation the government of the Finnish Socialist Workers' Republic during the Finnish Civil War period in 1918. After the civil war, Lindqvist fled to Soviet Russia where he became a member of the industrial committee of the Finnish Communist Party and was a member of the party's military organization.

During the Kuusinen Club Incident, Lindqvist was shot and killed on 31 August 1920 in Petrograd (now Saint Petersburg) by members of the internal opposition of the SKP. He was buried at the Monument to the Fighters of the Revolution on the Field of Mars in Saint Petersburg.

Lindqvist was married from 1903 to Anna Siviä Backman.
