= Väinö E. Jokinen =

Finnish politician (1879–1920)

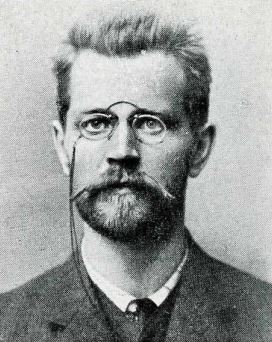
Väinö Jokinen in 1908

Väinö E. Jokinen (March 31, 1879 – August 31, 1920) was a Finnish journalist and MP. Jokinen was a member of the Parliament of Finland from 1908 to 1918, representing the Social Democratic Party of Finland (SDP). During the 1918 Finnish Civil War, Jokinen was the secretary of the Central Workers' Council.

Jokinen was born in Suoniemi. His father was steward Efraim Jokinen, and his mother was Fanny Wilhelmiina Tamlander. He graduated from high school in 1899. He translated to Finnish while studying. He worked in Hämeenlinna in Kanerva magazine's reporter 1904–1905 and in Kansan Lehti in Tampere 1906–1908, Työmies magazine's reporter in Helsinki 1906–1908, Hämeen Voima magazine's reporter in Hämeenlinna 1908–1912 and Sosialisti magazine's main editor in Turku 1912–1917.

Jokinen was Social Democratic MP from Häme southern electoral district 1909-1914 and 1917.

Jokinen was the deputy speaker of Finnish Parliament in 1917, and chairman of the Grand Committee. In 1917 Jokinen worked as secretary of the Finnish Labour Union and during the Finnish Civil War he was Worker's Head Council's and People's Delegation's secretary.

After the war Jokinen fled to Soviet Russia and worked in the Council of Perm in 1918 and Kumous magazine's and Finnish Communist publications department's reporter, translating articles into Finnish. Jokinen was a member of the Finnish Communist Party's central committee and Russian Communist Party's Finnish department's main offices chairman.

Jokinen was one of the eight fatalities of the Kuusinen Club Incident in Petrograd on August 31, 1920. He was buried at the Monument to the Fighters of the Revolution on the Field of Mars in Saint Petersburg.

His wife Alma Jokinen was also a Social Democratic MP.
