= Eloranta =

Eloranta is a Finnish surname. Notable people with the surname include:

- Voitto Eloranta (1876–1923), Finnish schoolteacher, journalist and politician
- Evert Eloranta (1879–1936), Finnish politician
- Kari Eloranta (born 1956), Finnish professional ice hockey player
- Teijo Eloranta (born 1960), Finnish actor and television writer
- Kari Eloranta (born 1963), Finnish professional ice hockey player
- Mikko Eloranta (born 1972), Finnish ice hockey player
- Eeva-Johanna Eloranta, Finnish politician
