= Kuusinen Club Incident =

1920 murders in Petrograd, Russia

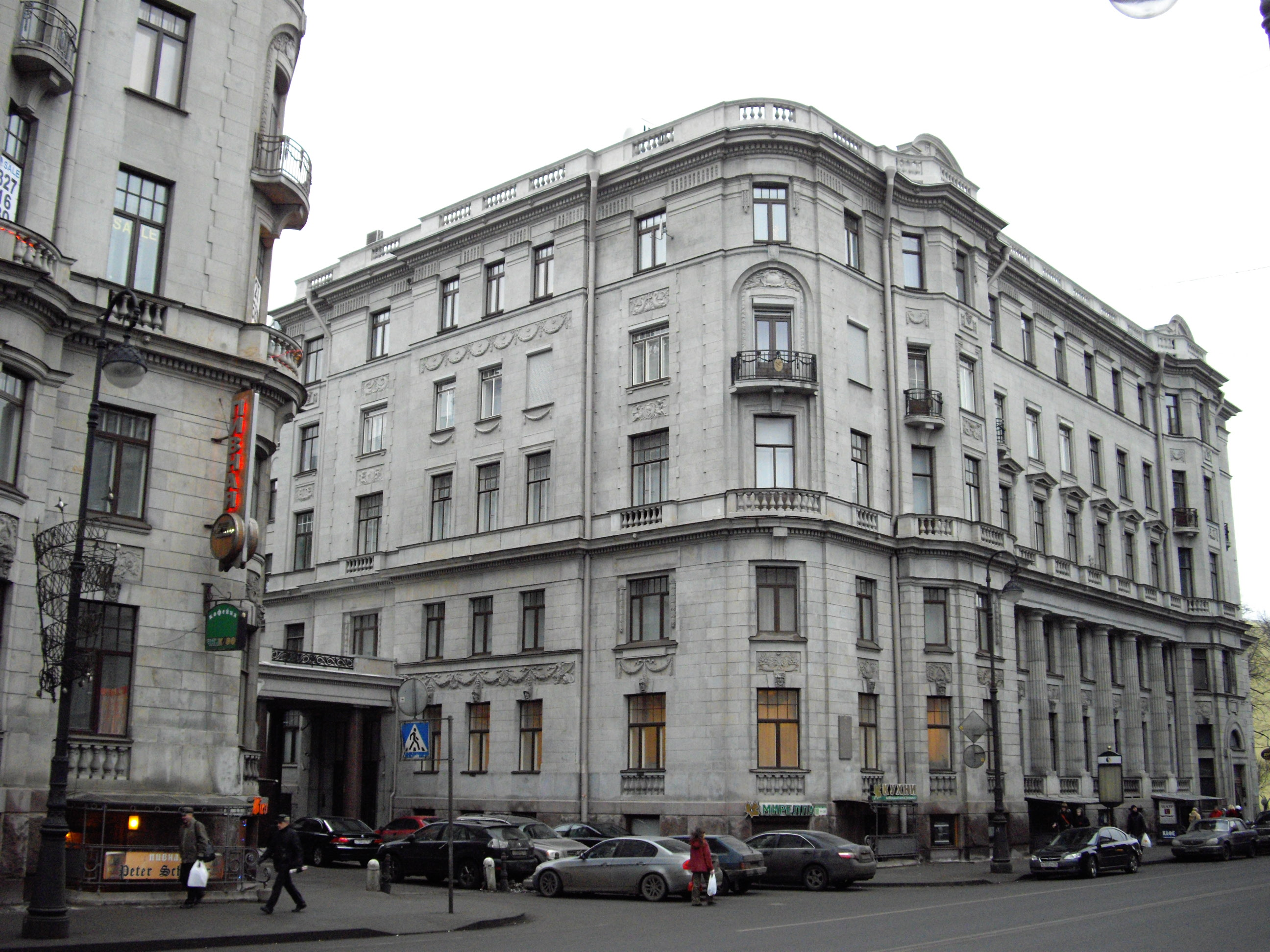
The Kuusinen Club was located in Kamenno-ostrovski prospekt 26–28, in Saint Petersburg

The Kuusinen Club Incident (Finnish: Kuusisen klubin murhat) was the murder of eight members of the Finnish Communist Party in the Kuusinen Club (their Petrograd office), on 31 August 1920.

== Background ==
After the end of the Finnish Civil War in 1918, thousands of Red Guards fled to Russia, mostly to Petrograd. The leaders of the Guard lived lavishly, spending their time in the best hotels and restaurants of Petrograd. They had millions of Finnish marks' worth of foreign exchange that they had stolen from the Bank of Finland.

Many other Finnish Communists who had fled to Soviet Russia were living in very poor conditions, and those who openly criticized party leaders were expelled from the party.

The party began to schism into so-called "revolver oppositions", whose target was to remove the gap between the leaders and the supporters by open violence.

== Deaths ==
- Tuomas W. Hyrskymurto, party staff
- Väinö E. Jokinen, former MP and member of the Finnish Communist Party's central committee
- Ferdinand T. Kettunen, Finnish Communist Party's military organization's steward
- Konsta Lindqvist, former MP and People's Committee's member and transportation delegate
- Jukka Rahja (alias Ivan Abramovitsh Rahja), member of the Finnish Communist Party's central committee
- Jussi Sainio, representative of the Revolutionary Communist Party
- Liisa Savolainen, clerk of military organization
- Juho Viitasaari, Red commander

== Shooters ==
The shooters were six students of the red officer academy, led by Aku Paasi (former August Pyy) and Allan Hägglund.

The shooters wrote letters describing their motives, and then surrendered voluntarily to the Soviet authorities. In 1922, they were convicted; Voitto Eloranta, who was not present at the shooting scene, was sentenced to death as the organizer, and the others were sentenced to three to five years in prison in Buryatia. Eventually, the death sentence of Eloranta was commuted, and by July 1922, all the shooters were released from jail. Eloranta, however, was executed in 1923 after Eino Rahja, Jukka's elder brother, lobbied the reconsideration of the commutations. Eloranta's wife Elvira Willman was executed in April 1925.

== Memorial ==
The victims were buried at the Monument to the Fighters of the Revolution on the Field of Mars. An estimated 100,000 people attended the funeral. A memorial service took part in Hermitage on 20 September 1920.

The memorial plaque says that the victims were "Murdered by White Finnish Guards", although the killers had actually been former Red Guard members.
