= Elvira Willman =

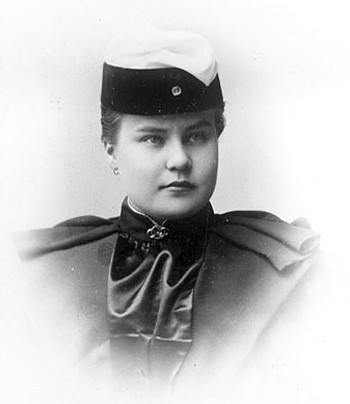
- Elvira Willman as a graduate in 1894
- Born: 10 August 1875; Uusikaupunki, Grand Duchy of Finland
- Died: 17 April 1925 (aged 49); Moscow, Soviet Union
- Cause of death: Execution by firing squad
- Occupations: playwright, journalist, revolutionary
- Years active: 1895–1918

Agnes Elvira Maria Willman (10 August 1875 – 17 April 1925) was a Finnish playwright, journalist and a revolutionary socialist who was one of the most prominent women of the early Finnish labour movement. Willman is also considered as the first female working-class writer in Finland, despite coming from a bourgeois background. After the 1918 Finnish Civil War, Willman and her husband, Voitto Eloranta fled to the Soviet Russia. They were both later accused of being involved with the Kuusinen Club Incident, a murder of eight Finnish communists. Eloranta was executed in 1922 and Willman in 1925.

== Life ==
Elvira Willman was born in the Western Finnish town of Uusikaupunki. After her parents' divorce, Willman moved to Helsinki, graduating from the Swedish-speaking high school in 1894. She studied languages, history and literature at the University of Helsinki and spent the season 1899–1900 in the University of Paris. Back in Finland, Willman was active in the liberal Young Finnish Party organizing resistance against the Russification of Finland. She soon got interested of the labour movement. Willman joined the Social Democratic Party and worked as a writer in a leftist literary magazine. In August 1906, Willman was involved with the Sveaborg rebellion, a mutiny of Russian sailors in the Suomenlinna seafort near Helsinki. She was one of the mutineers contacts in Helsinki and Willman's apartment was used as a meeting place.

During the 1918 Civil War, Willman worked as a journalist as her husband was a member of the Red Guard general staff at the Savo Front. As the war was turning against the Reds, Willman fled to the Soviet Russia with her children and Eloranta soon followed. Both joined the exiled Communist Party in Saint Petersburg and became affiliated with the party opposition standing against the central committee. On 31 August 1920, the conflict escalated as eight central committee members were murdered in their office. Russian court convicted Voitto Eloranta as the main instigator, although he denied involvement. Eloranta was executed in November 1922, but Willman was released as no evidence was found against her. Willman moved to Moscow where she was arrested again in July 1924. She was convicted on 13 April 1925, and executed four days later.

== Works ==
Wllman's work addresses issues of women's rights and even deals with queer issues. She debuted with the play Lyyli, premiered in the National Theatre of Finland in 1903. It is a story of a working-class woman named, Lyyli who is first seduced and then left by an upper-class man. The 1907 play Kellarikerroksessa (In the Basement) focuses on prostitution and queerness. The novel Vallankumouksen vyöry (The Tide of Revolution) is partly autobiographical reflecting the days of the 1906 Sveaborg rebellion, although the story itself takes place in the 1917 Russian Revolution. The novel includes a short scene of male-male attraction.

- Korpisuolaiset (1895)
- Lyyli (1903)
- Rhodon valtias (1904)
- Lucretia Borgia (1904)
- Kellarikerroksessa (1907)
- Juopa (1908)
- Rakkauden orjuus (1916)
- Veriuhrit (1917)
- Vallankumouksen vyöry (1918)
