= Tuomas W. Hyrskymurto =

Finnish Communist revolutionary

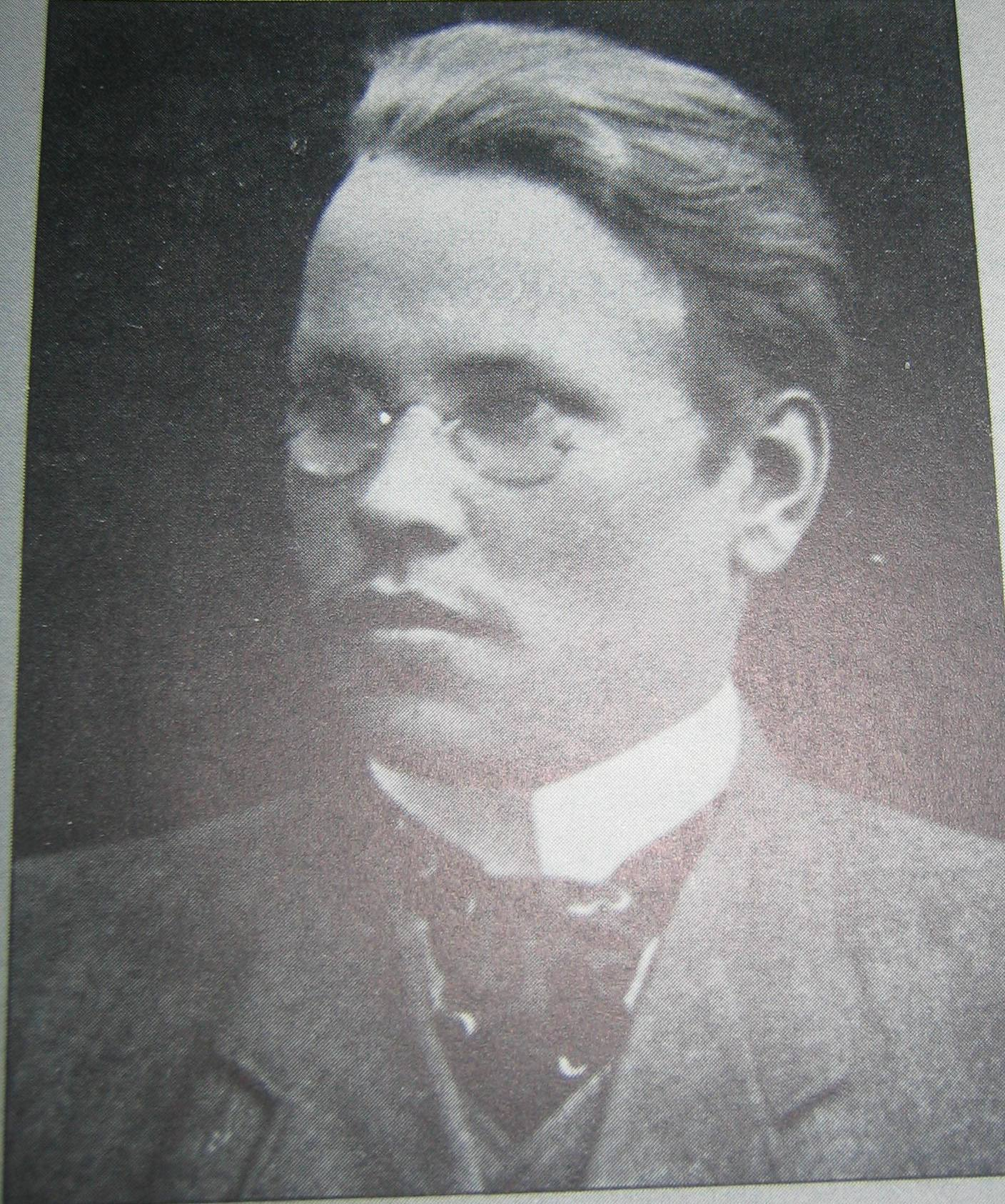
Tuomas Hyrskymurto

Tuomas Wilho Hyrskymurto (September 14, 1881 – August 31, 1920) was a Finnish Communist revolutionary who was originally a merchant from Turku.

Hyrskymurto was born in Turku in 1881. He was in prison during the Hakaniemi skirmish in 1906. In 1917 he was a member of Turku social democratic city council's radical wing and one of the founders of the Turku Red Guard.

During the Finnish Civil War Hyrskymurto was in the Red Guard in Northern frontier as control commissar and member of the Tampere Red Guard. At the start of the war, Hyrskymurto led the Turku Red Guard with 300 cavalries and occupied Toijala railway station on January 26, 1918.

He also planned the Suinula massacre, which took place on January 31, where he ordered that the Red Guard should not take any prisoners. After the massacre, he was known as the "Butcher of Suinula". When the White Guard was besieging Tampere, Hyrskymurto left the city and went to Toijala Red Guard commanders Eino Rahja's deputy and tried to break the Tampere siege from the south. On April 20, he ordered the murder of 23 Mustiala agriculture students in Kuurila.

After the war, Hyrskymurto fled to Soviet Russia. Leaving Finland, Hyrskymurto left at the border a huge collection of Finnish and foreign Bolshevik literature which was offered to the University of Helsinki. The books were taken later to the university's library.

In Soviet Russia, Hyrskymurto worked as the organizer of the Finnish Communist Party central committee. He was one of the eight victims killed by Finnish Communists on August 31, 1920, in Saint Petersburg during the Kuusinen Club Incident.

Hyrskymurto was buried at the Monument to the Fighters of the Revolution on the Field of Mars in Saint Petersburg. His name is found located on the grave of the August Communards.
