= Kanervo =

Kanervo is a Finnish surname. Notable people with this surname include:

- Antti Kanervo (born 1989), Finnish basketball player
- Jussi Kanervo (born 1993), Finnish hurdler
- Mimmi Kanervo (1870–1922), Finnish politician and trade unionist
- Ossi Kanervo (born 1987), Finnish ice dancer

== See also ==
- Kanerva
