= Juho Viitasaari =

Juho Theodor Viitasaari (30 January 1891 – 31 August 1920) was a Finnish communist activist and a Helsinki-based baker. Born in Orivesi, Viitasaari was one of the founders of the Finnish Communist Party in 1918. He was a Red Guard officer in Saint Petersburg in 1920.

Viitasaari was one of the victims of the Kuusinen Club Incident in Saint Petersburg in 1920 when radical Finnish communists killed eight members of the Communist Party in a power struggle.

Viitasaari is buried at the Monument to the Fighters of the Revolution on the Field of Mars in Saint Petersburg and his name is found on the grave of August Communards.
