= Ferdinand T. Kettunen =

Ferdinand Teodor Kettunen (18 January 1889 – 31 August 1920) was a Finnish communist activist.

Kettunen was born in Saint Petersburg, Russian Empire, where he worked in the steel industry. He was already active in underground movements from 1905.

Kettunen was also an active member of the Russian Social Democratic Labour Party from 1906. In 1920 he became the steward of the Finnish Communist Party's military organization. Kettunen was one of the victims of the Kuusinen Club Incident in Petrograd (now Saint Petersburg) in 1920 when radical Finnish communists killed eight members of the Communist Party in a power struggle.

Kettunen is buried at the Monument to the Fighters of the Revolution on the Field of Mars in Saint Petersburg and his name is found located on the grave of the August Communards.
