= Voitto Eloranta =

Finnish politician

Johan Viktor (Voitto) Eloranta (6 July 1876 - 1923; original surname Lindroos) was a Finnish schoolteacher, journalist and politician, born in Janakkala. He was a member of the Parliament of Finland from 1907 to 1908 and again from 1909 to 1911, representing the Social Democratic Party of Finland (SDP). In 1918, during the Finnish Civil War, he was a member of the Staff of the Central Front of the Red side. After the collapse of the Finnish Socialist Workers' Republic, Eloranta fled to Soviet Russia, where he was among the founders of the Communist Party of Finland (SKP). He eventually joined the internal opposition of the SKP and in 1922, after the Kuusinen Club Incident, where eight Finnish communists were shot by members of the party opposition, he was sentenced to death by a Soviet tribunal, accused of being the main instigator of the incident. His death sentence was initially commuted. However, Eino Rahja, brother of one of the Kuusinen Club Incident victims Jukka Rahja, successfully lobbied the reconsideration of the commutation. Eloranta was executed in 1923.

Eloranta was married to the playwright Elvira Willman who also faced the same charge as her husband. However, Willman was released as no evidence was found against her. She was arrested again in July 1924, convicted on 13 April 1925, and executed four days later.
