= Jussi Sainio =

Finnish politician (1880–1920)

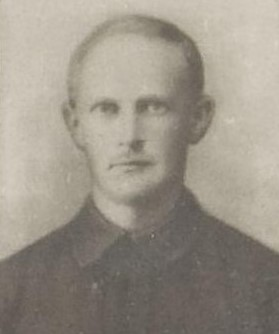
Portrait of Jussi Sainio

Johan (Jussi) Walfrid Sainio (3 October 1880 – 31 August 1920) was a Finnish pastry chef, trade union organiser and politician, born in Pyhäjärvi Ul. He was a member of the Parliament of Finland from 1908 to 1917. In 1918 he took part in the Finnish Civil War on the Red side. After the collapse of the Finnish Socialist Workers' Republic he fled to Soviet Russia, where he was among the founders of the Communist Party of Finland (SKP). Sainio, along with seven other Finnish communists, was killed on 31 August 1920 during the Kuusinen Club Incident in Petrograd by members of the internal opposition of the SKP in the so-called "revolver opposition".
