= Otto Piisinen =

Finnish politician and journalist

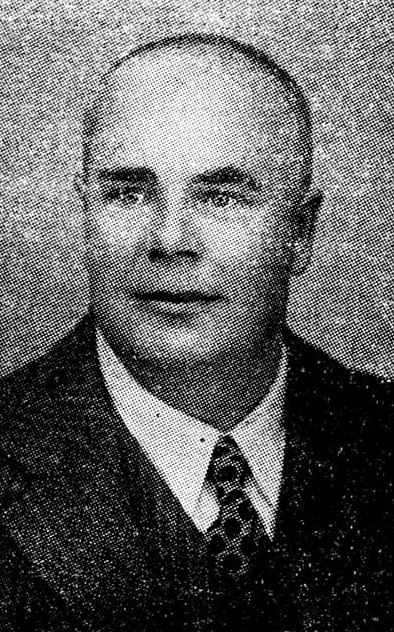
Image of Otto Piisinen

Otto Piisinen (17 August 1885, Kuopion maalaiskunta – 15 August 1965) was a Finnish journalist and politician. He was a Member of the Parliament of Finland from 1913 to 1917, representing the Social Democratic Party of Finland (SDP). He belonged to the right wing of the party and, unlike most members of his party, sided with the Whites during the Finnish Civil War of 1918. Moving even further to the right, he was later active in the Patriotic People's Movement (IKL).
