= Kanerva =

Kanerva is a Finnish surname which is also used as a unisex given name. Notable people with the surname include:

- Emma Kanerva (born 1985), Finnish dressage rider
- Ilkka Kanerva (1948–2022), Finnish politician
- Janne Kanerva (born 1970), Finnish weightlifter
- Markku Kanerva (born 1964), Finnish football manager and former player
- Pentti Kanerva, American neuroscientist
- Silja Kanerva (born 1985), Finnish sailor
- William Kanerva (1902–1956), Finnish football player

== See also ==
- Kanervo
