= Military parade =

Procession of soldiers

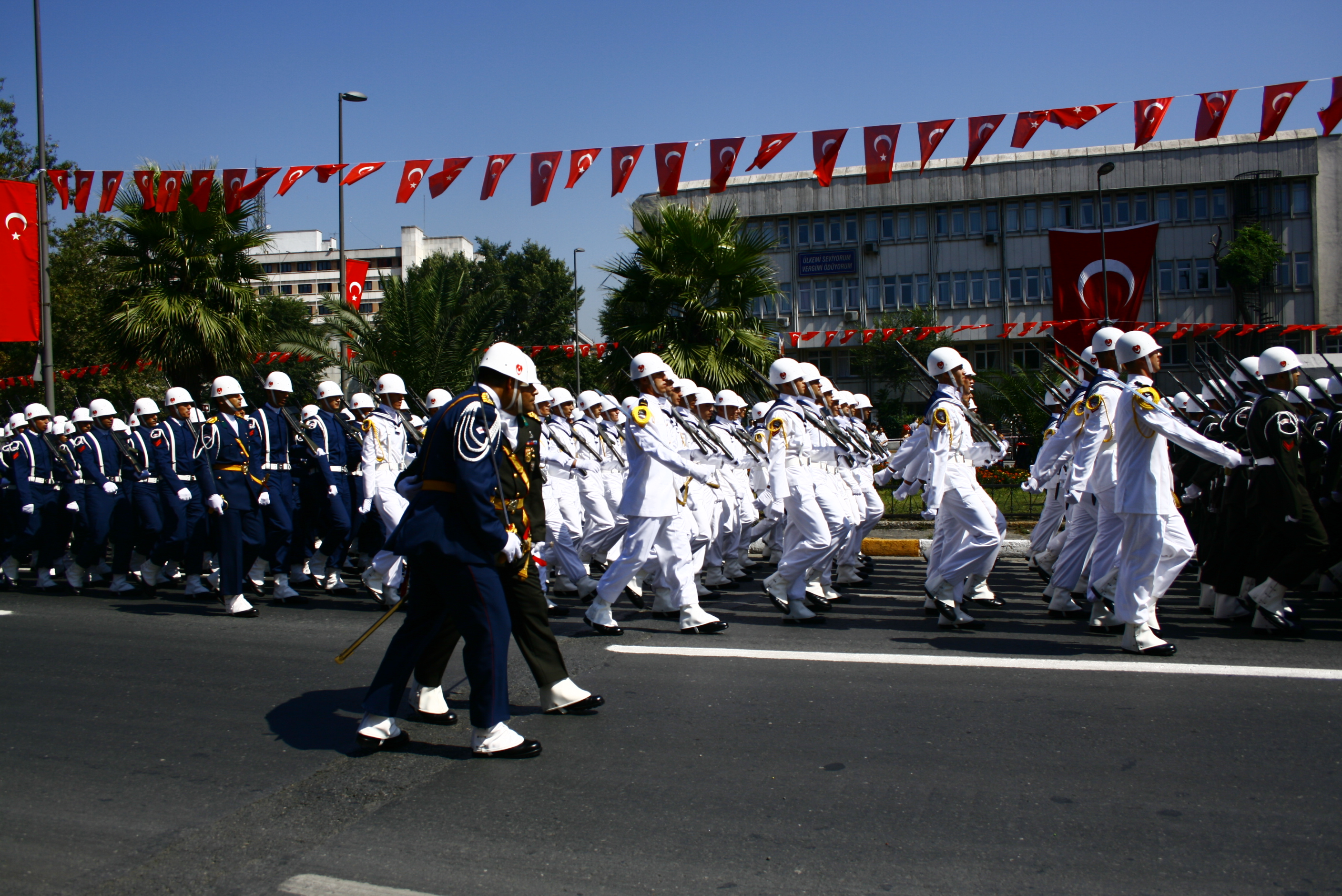
Parade at the Victory Day in Istanbul

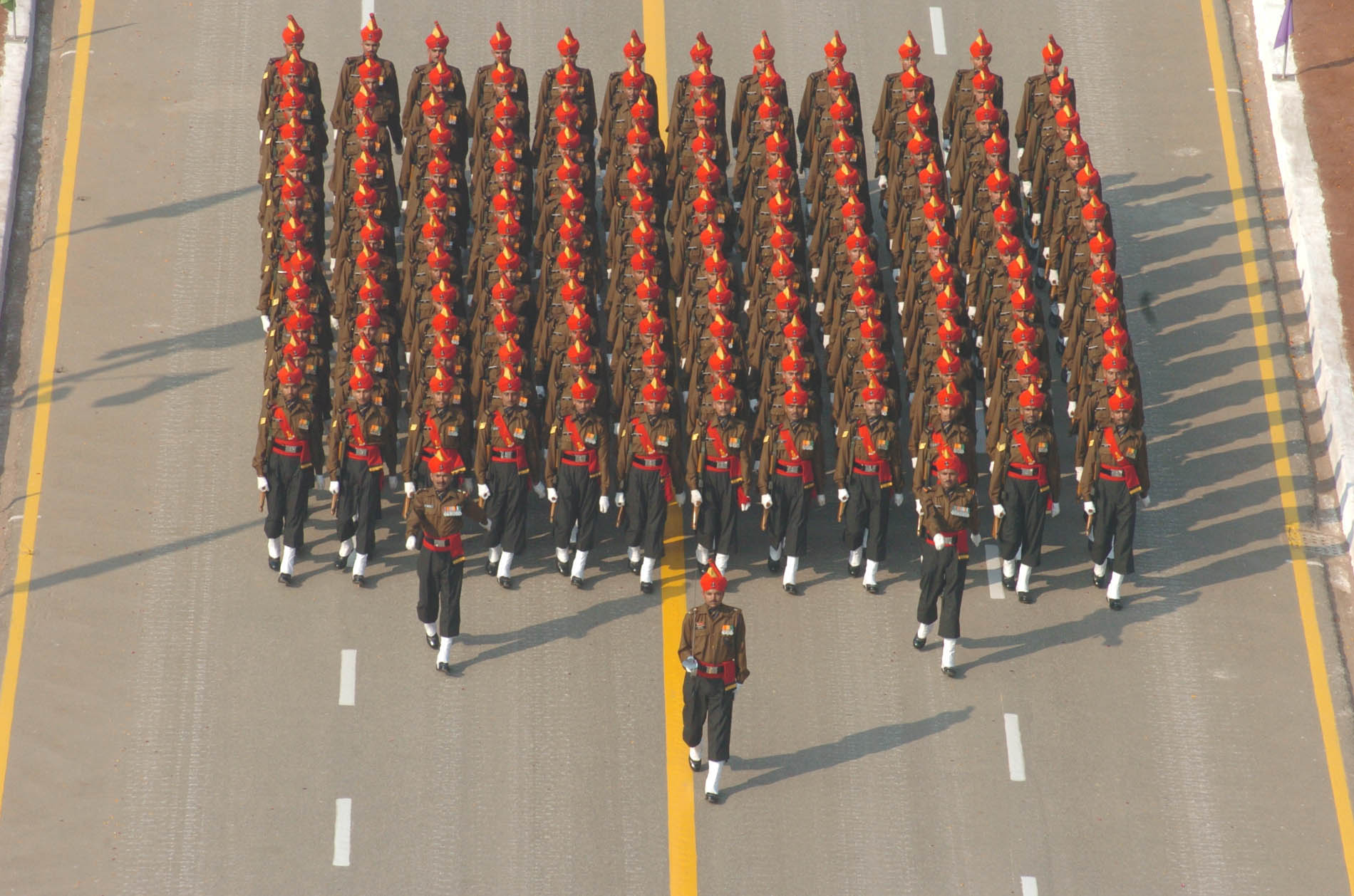
A marching contingent during the Republic Day Parade from India Gate, in New Delhi

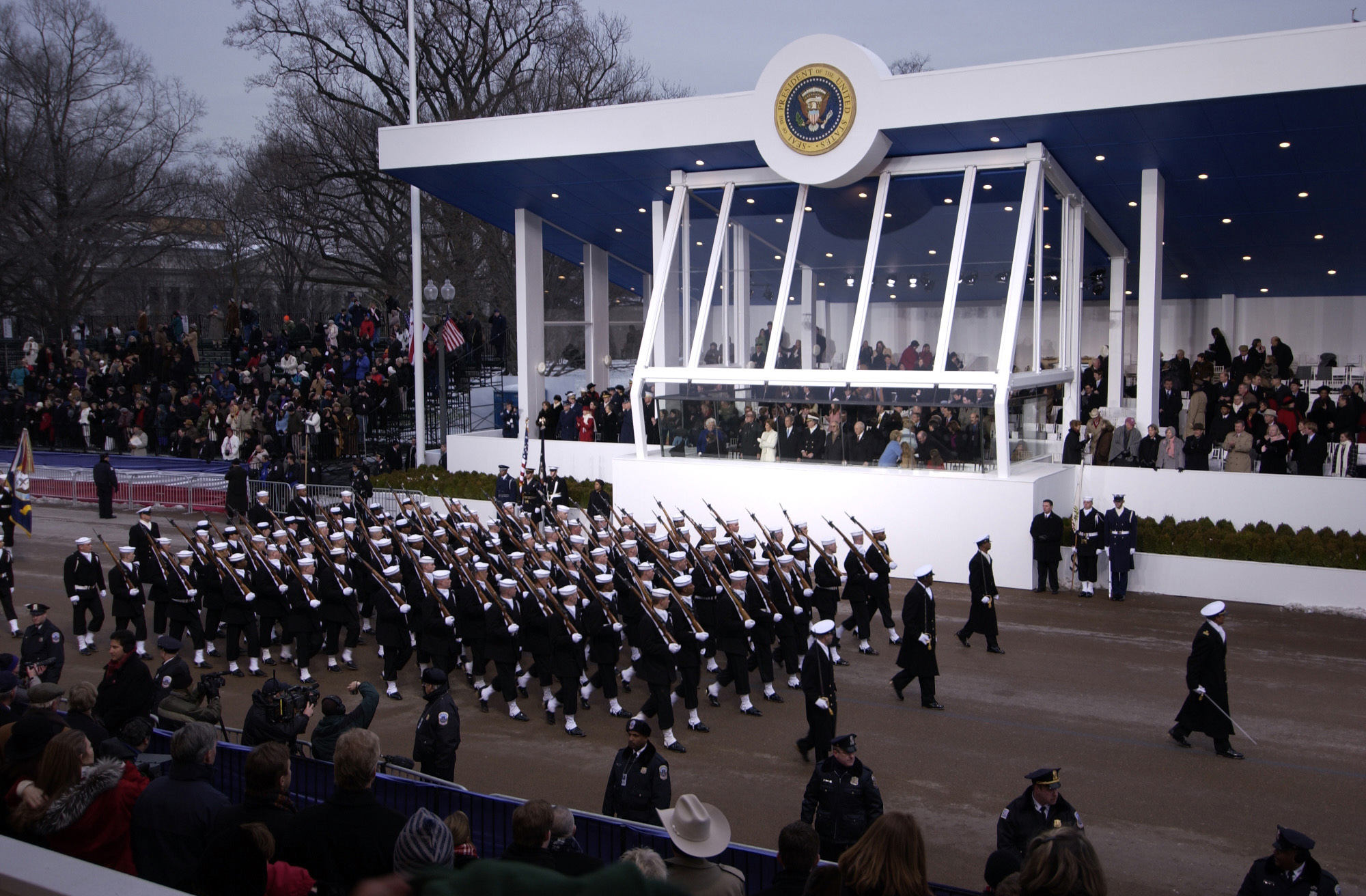
United States presidential inaugural parade held in Washington D.C.

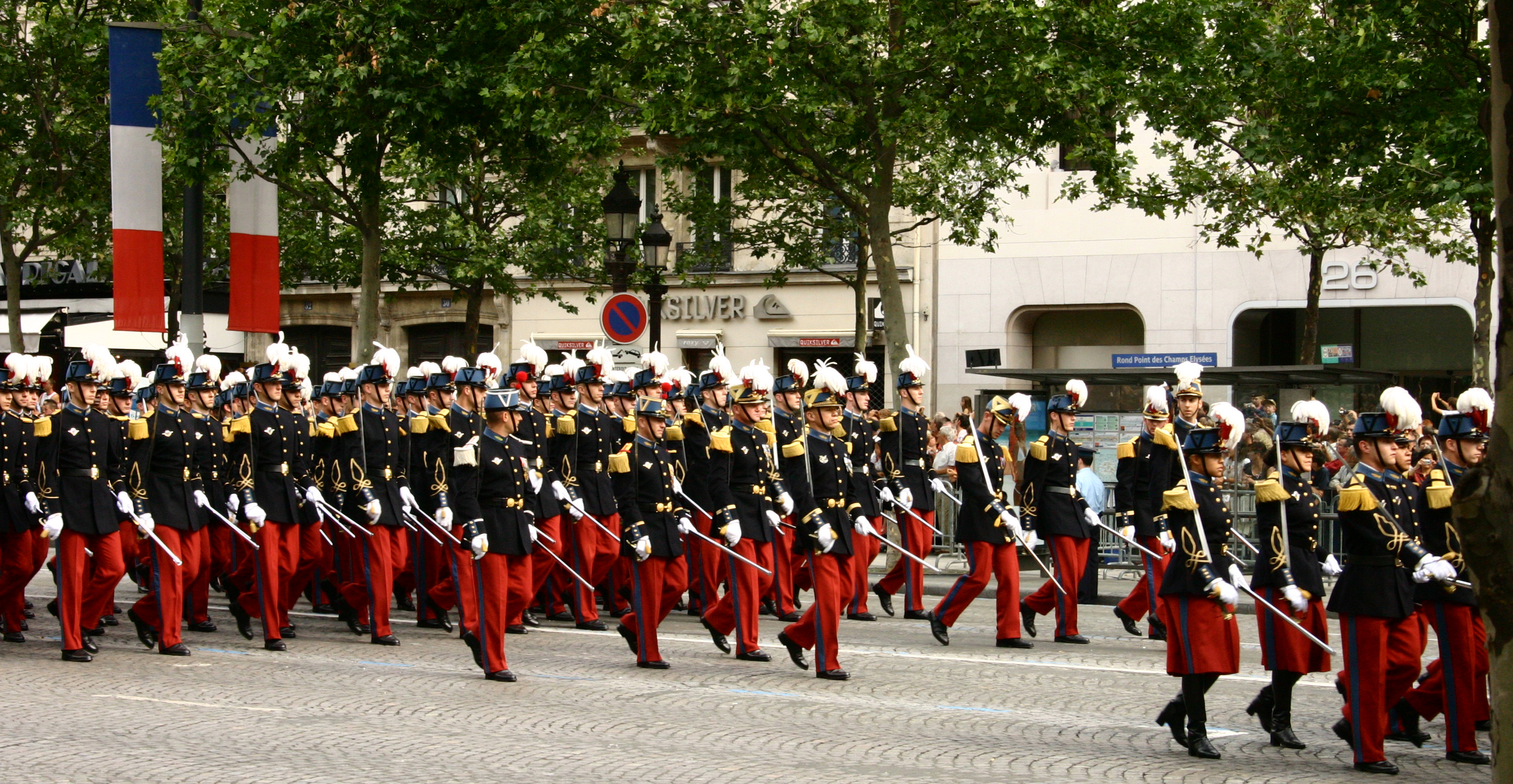
Saint-Cyr cadets at the Bastille Day military parade on the Champs-Élysées

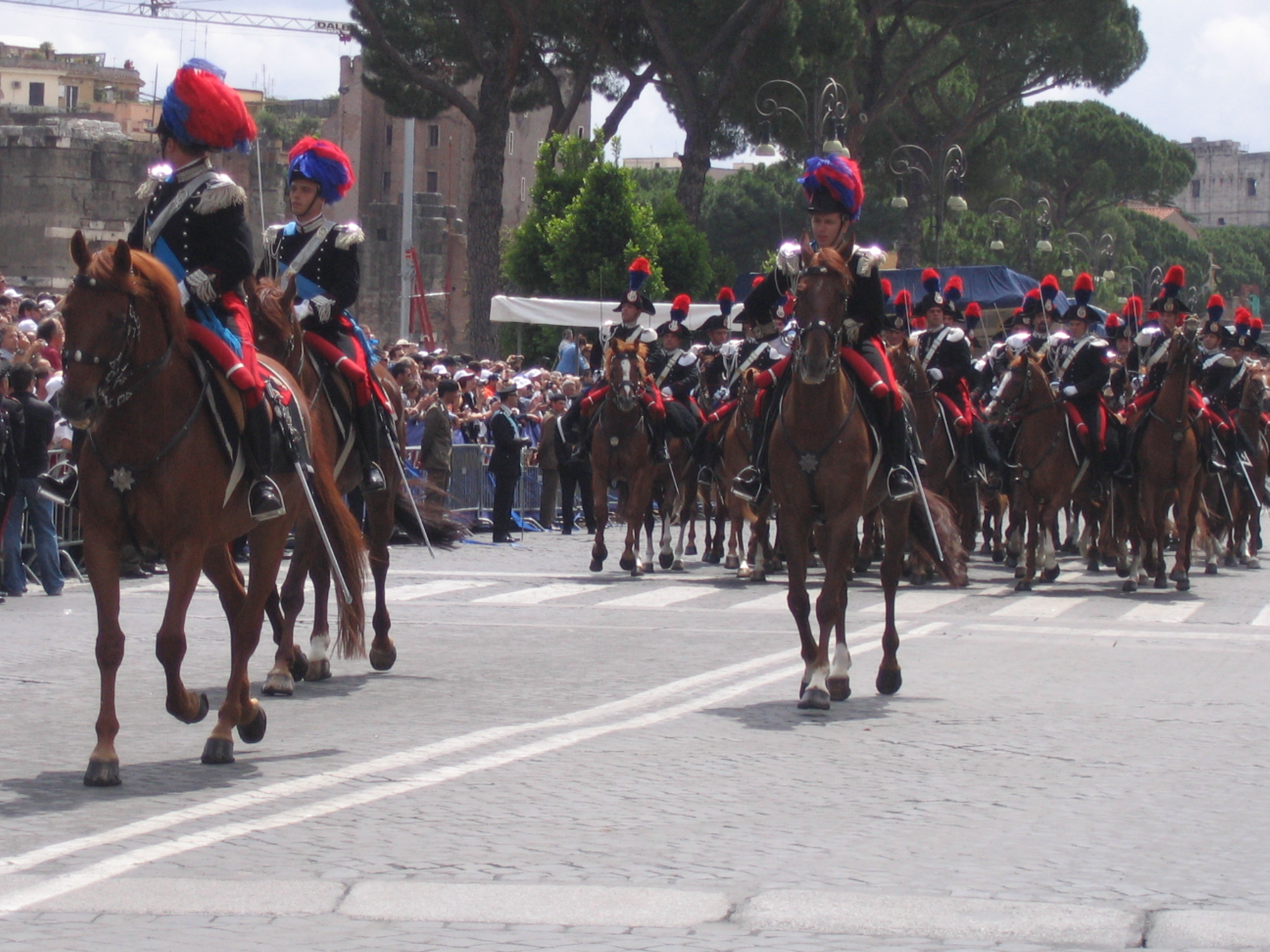
4th Carabinieri Mounted Regiment at the military parade of Festa della Repubblica 2007

A military parade is a formation of military personnels whose movement is restricted by close-order manoeuvering known as drill or marching. Large military parades are today held on major holidays and military events around the world. Massed parades may also hold a role for propaganda purposes, being used to exhibit the apparent military strength of a country.

== History ==
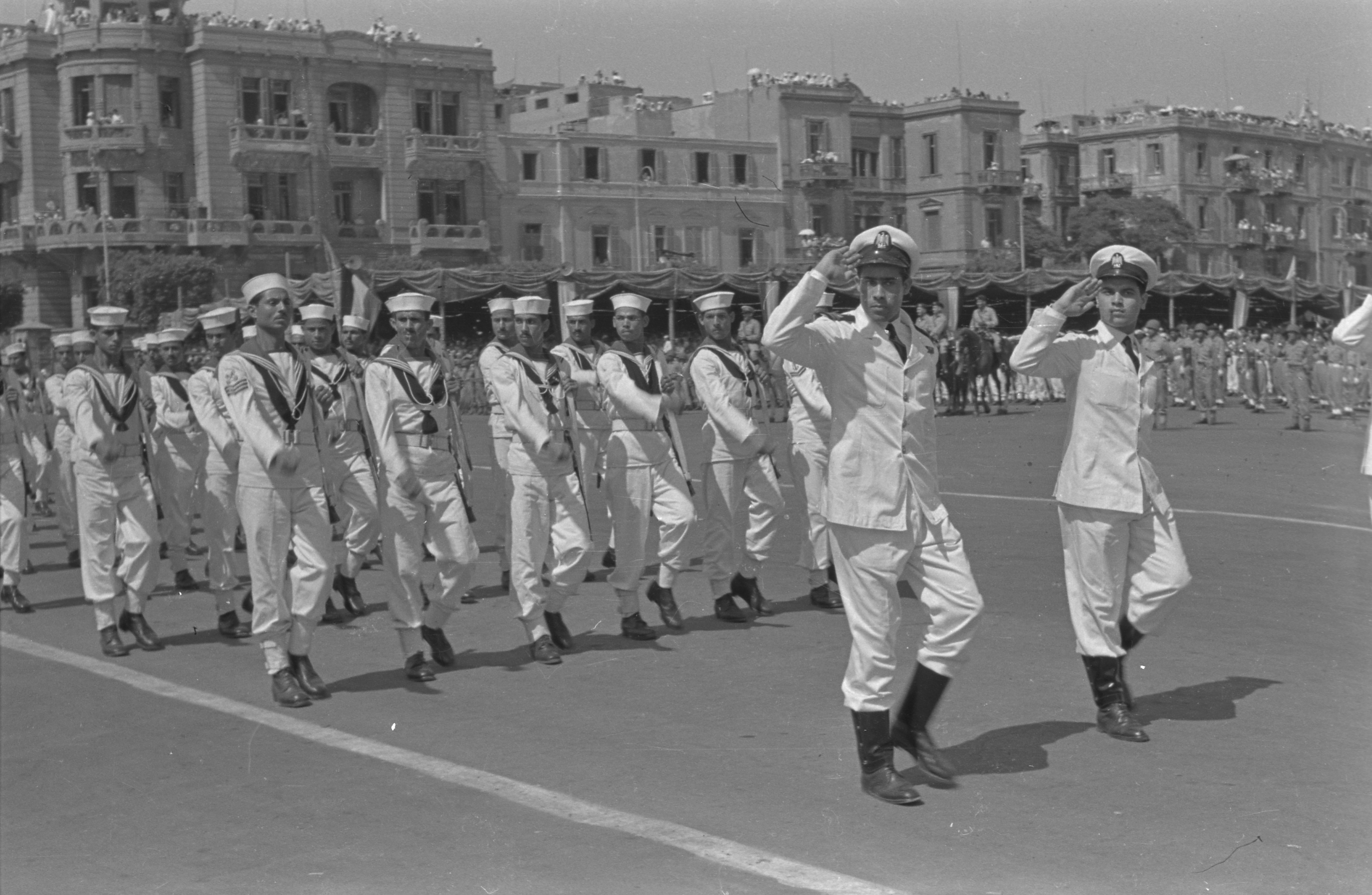
A military parade in Cairo, 1955

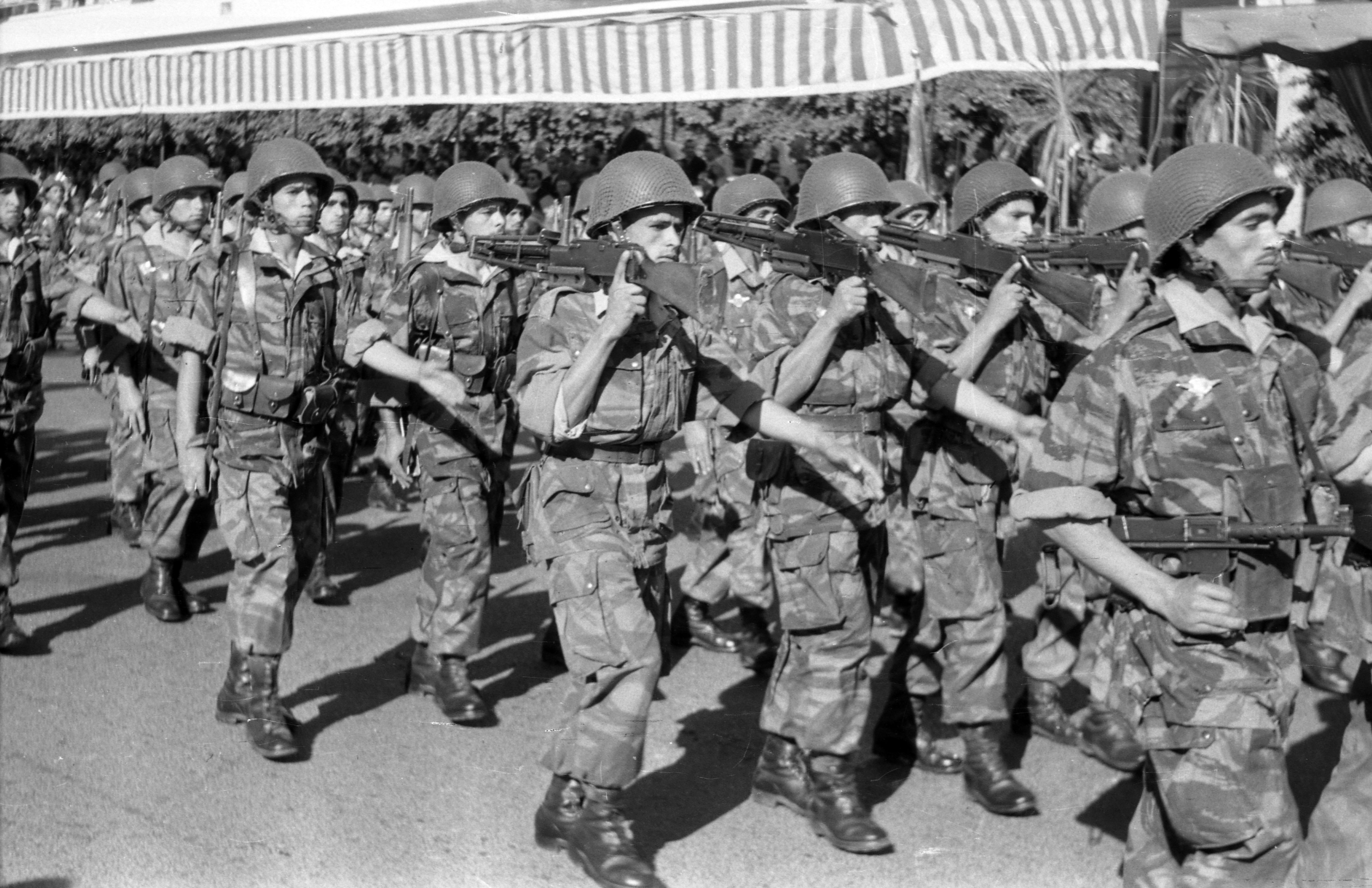
A military parade in Morocco, 1960

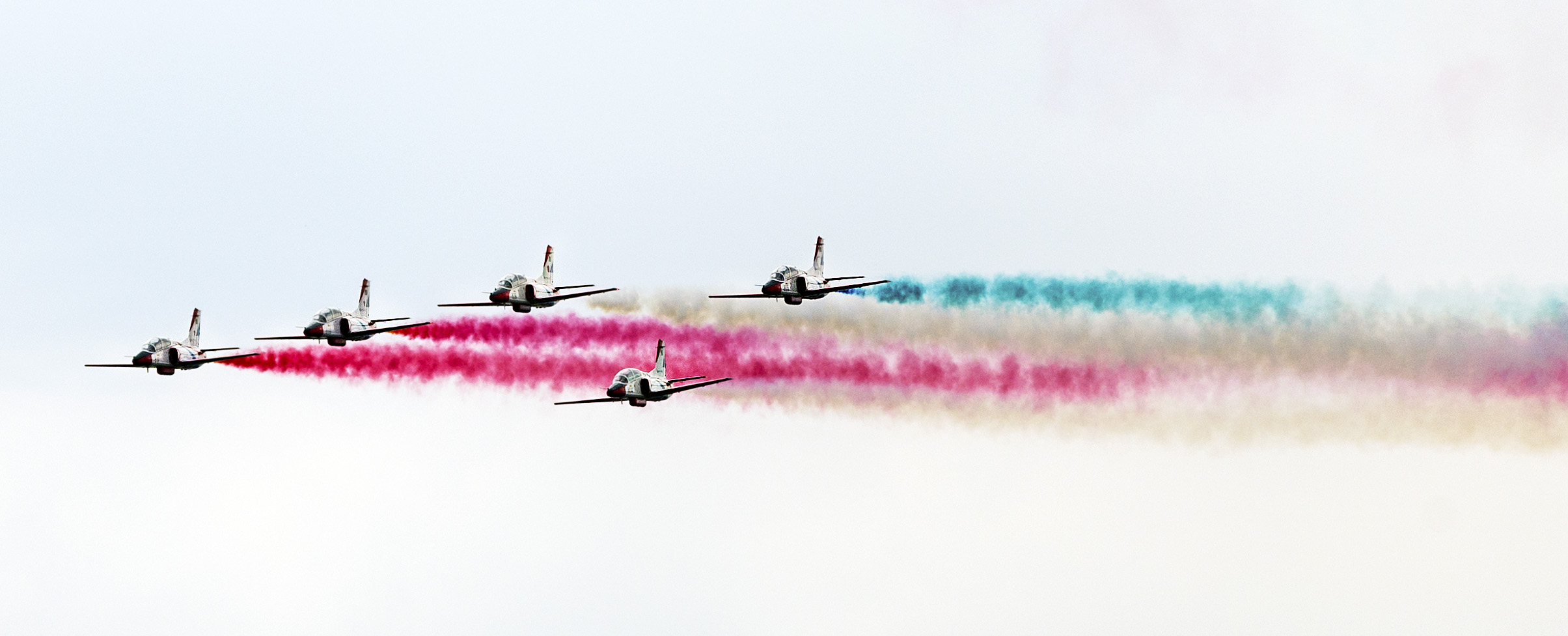
Members of the Pakistani Air Force during a parade rehearsal in 2016.

A military parade is a formation of soldiers whose movement is restricted by close-order manoeuvering known as drilling or marching. The terminology comes from the tradition of close order formation combat, in which soldiers were held in very strict formations as to maximise their combat effectiveness. Formation combat was used as an alternative to melee combat, and required strict discipline in the ranks and competent officers. Close order formation combat has been phased out by advances in military equipment and tactic, and modern infantry now use skirmish formation and order. However, foot drill is an important part of military education and training to instill pride and discipline among personnel.

In ancient times, drilling increased in importance when men stopped fighting as individuals and began to fight together as units. Drilling as a vital component of a war machine further increased with the increases in the size of armies, for example, when Philip II of Macedon disciplined his army so they could swiftly form the phalanxes that were so critical to his successes as a general. Military drilling later was used by the Roman Army to maximise efficiency and deadliness throughout their long history.

Modern armies use parades for ceremonial purposes, encouragement and show of discipline and to instill confidence in the country's military forces.

The U.S. drill is based on the contributions of Baron von Steuben, a Prussian Army officer who served in the Continental Army. During the winter quarters in Valley Forge, Pennsylvania, von Steuben taught a model company of 100 soldiers musket drill. These soldiers, in turn, taught the remainder of the Continental Army.

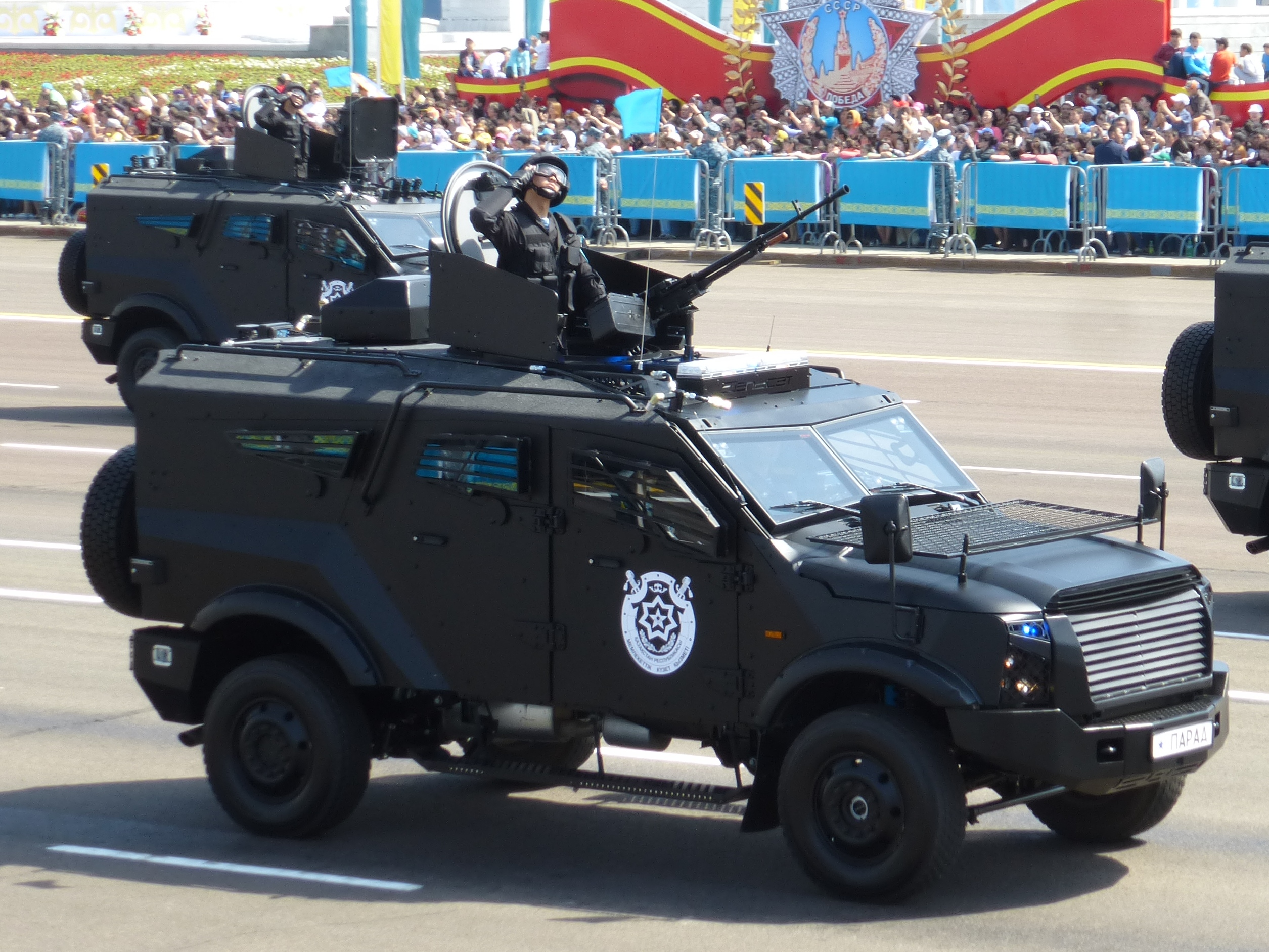
Parade during Defender of the Fatherland Day in Astana (then Nur-Sultan)

The oldest, largest and most famous regular military parade in Europe is the Bastille Day Military Parade which is held each 14 July, on the Champs-Élysées in Paris, during France's national day celebrations.

== Rationale ==
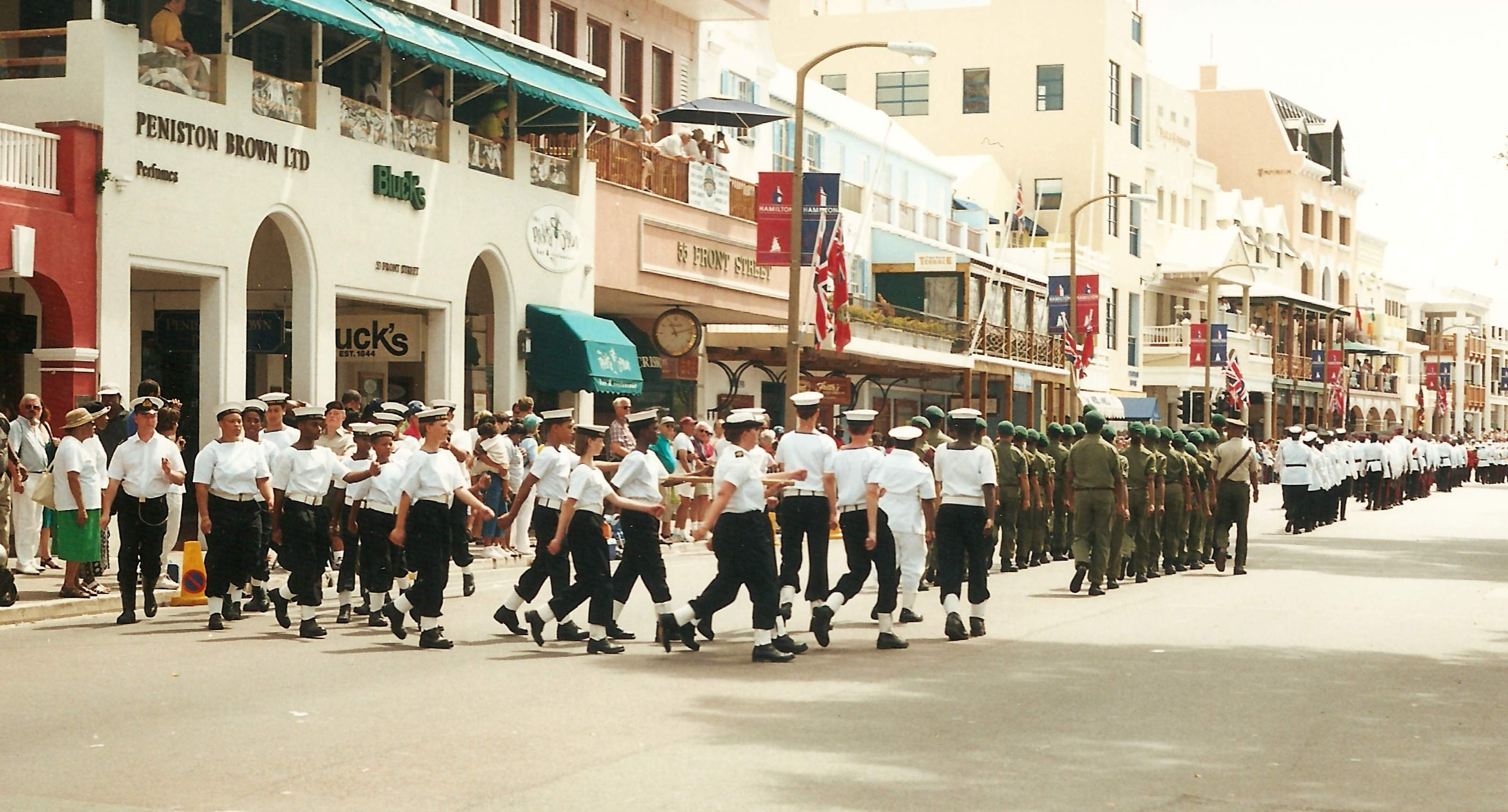
Queen's Birthday Parade, Hamilton, Bermuda, 2000

A military drill is memorizing certain actions through repetition until the action is instinctive to the soldiers being drilled. Complex actions are broken down into simpler ones which can be practiced in isolation so when the whole is put together the desired results are achieved. Such is necessary for a fighting force to perform at maximum efficiency in all manner of situations. However, depending on the army and the drills it adopts, drilling may destroy flexibility and initiative in exchange for predictability and cohesion.

Recruits in most modern militaries are taught drill to teach them how to work and move as a team. In addition, formations are still used in riot control, where mêlée combat is still the norm.

== Types of military parades ==
- Flypast
- Victory parade
- Naval parade
- Pass in review

== Current era ==
Drill is today used to demonstrate discipline and cohesion in a modern military force. Large military parades are today held on major holidays and military events around the world. It usually held on occasions of national importance such as a country's independence day, and therefore is presided over by the head of state who, in most cases, is the commander in chief of the combined national military forces of that country. Today, military parades include all aspects of military drill, from an exhibition drill of precision drill teams and military bands (in addition to the occasional corps of drums, fanfare band, pipe band and/or drum and bugle corps), as well as an exhibition of military weapons such as a mobile column, the occasional mounted cavalry column (led by a mounted band), a naval parade, and a fly past by the country's air force. When on parade, most of the participating soldiers wear their ceremonial uniforms and carry the standards/colours of their respective battalions/regiments/corps/academies. In many countries, the military contingent is joined by contingents from youth cadet organizations, personnel from the police and fire services, civil defense and emergency services and by occasion jail and border services, youth police and fire cadets, veterans and personnel of the civil service with occasional participation by civilian organizations, educational institutions, cultural groups and athletes.

=== By country ===
==== Albania ====
Albania has long been influenced by Greek and Italian influences and even Soviet/Russian tradition. During the era of the People's Socialist Republic of Albania, Liberation Day, which then the main national holiday, was celebrated with a military parade of the Albanian People's Army on Tirana's Dëshmorët e Kombit Boulevard. These parades have been held in 1954, 1959, 1964, 1974, 1984 and 1989. They usually consist of veterans, schoolchildren, militiamen alongside regular force personnel.

Today, military parades of the Albanian Armed Forces are held on Albanian Flag Day and Constitution Day on 28 November. One of the more notable modern military parades was held on the 100th Anniversary of the Independence of Albania, in which a special unit of 65 soldiers from the Kosovo Security Force, as well as other foreign contingents, participated. The other took place on 4 December 2007 in honour of the 95th anniversary of the Albanian Armed Forces.

==== Argentina ====
Argentina's long history of military parades are a heritage inherited from the times of the Spanish colonial Viceroyalty of Rio de la Plata, with influences from Germany, France, Britain, and Italy. Today the Armed Forces of the Argentine Republic, together with the paramilitary Argentine National Gendarmerie and Argentine Naval Prefecture hosts massive military parades featuring armed companies, cadets, and military bands on the following days (national events unless otherwise noted):

- January 24 – anniversary of the beginning of the Crossing of the Andes (local commemoration)
- February 3 – anniversary of the Battle of San Lorenzo (local commemoration)
- April 2 – Malvinas War Veterans' Day
- May 10 – anniversary of Air Force baptism of fire in the Falklands War
- May 17 – Navy Day, anniversary of the victory at the Battle of Buceo
- May 25 – First National Government Anniversary Day
- May 29 – Army Day
- June 17 – General Martín Miguel de Güemes Memorial Day (local commemoration)
- June 20 – Flag Day
- June 30 – Naval Prefecture Day
- July 9 – Independence Day
- July 28 – National Gendarmerie Day
- August 10 – Air Force Day
- September 24 – Battle of Tucuman Day (local commemoration)
- November 20 – National Sovereignty Day

==== Australia and New Zealand ====
As both Commonwealth realms, Australia and New Zealand share the customs and traditions of parades of the British Armed Forces. The friendship and cooperation of the defence services of both countries can be seen in the annual Anzac Day parades every 25 April, in memory of the namesake Australian and New Zealand Army Corps, which was heavily involved in the long Battle of Gallipoli and were the first Allied forces to land there on that day in 1915. On this day, in many major cities in these two countries, parades are held involving personnel of both the Australian Defence Force and the New Zealand Defence Force, veterans' organizations, cadet organizations, and other youth uniformed groups and personnel of the police and fire services, as well as students of schools and universities honoring many of their fallen alumni of the long campaign.

Parades are also held jointly in these two countries on 11 November, Remembrance Day.

Aside from these two days, the schedule of annual military and civil parades held in these two countries is as follows:

- For parades in Australia:
  - National level parades are held on:
    - 26 January, Australia Day
    - The second Monday of June, the King's Birthday, marked in most of Eastern Australia, South Australia and the Northern Territory
      - typically the last Monday of September or the first Monday of October, King's Birthday Holiday for Western Australia
      - 1st Monday in October, King's Birthday Holiday for Queensland
  - Local parades involving armed forces, police and fire personnel are held on:
    - 2nd Monday in March in the ACT, Canberra Day
    - 6 June in Queensland, Queensland Day
    - first Monday in June in Western Australia, Western Australia Day
    - first working day after Christmas Day, Proclamation Day in South Australia
  - Parades are also held in the following cases:
    - during change of command, retirement and recruit and cadet passing out parades and regimental anniversaries within the service branches of the ADF and all military academies
    - During holiday parades held in major cities as can be permitted by the commander of the unit taking part, including:
      - the AFL Grand Final Parade in Melbourne
- For parades in New Zealand:
  - National level parades are held on:
    - 6 February, Waitangi Day
    - on the 1st Monday in June, the King's Birthday
  - Local parades involving armed forces, police, and fire personnel are held within the anniversary days of the former Provinces of New Zealand, which were abolished in 1876, the days of which are as set by their respective district and city governments.
  - Change of command, retirement, and recruit and cadet graduation parades, together with regimental anniversary parades, are also held occasionally within the service branches of the NZDF and its training institutions.

==== Bangladesh ====
The Bangladesh Armed Forces parade tradition was inherited from both the Pakistan and British Armed Forces as its first infantry unit, the East Bengal Regiment, was raised in then East Pakistan 1948 from Bengali servicemen who served in the former British Indian Army, whose drills were similar to those in the rest of the Commonwealth. Today the Armed Forces, together with Border Guards Bangladesh, the Bangladesh Police, Bangladesh Jail, Bangladesh Ansar, Bangladesh Fire Service & Civil Defence and the youth cadets under the Bangladesh National Cadet Corps, marches on ceremonial parades held on the following occasions:

- 26 March, Independence Day
- 21 November, Armed Forces Day
- 16 December, Victory Day
- On the occasion of change of command and passing out parades in all academies, cadet colleges and training institutions of the uniformed organizations

==== Bolivia ====
Uniquely, the parade tradition of the Bolivian Armed Forces is similar to those of Prussia and the German Empire but with the difference that the current march step is at slow time, to enable a knee-high goose step when on the march for most units (others, including recruit battalions and civilian students of the Military Engineering School, march in quick time without the goosestep and following the Bundeswehr practice). The Prussian tradition was introduced to the country in the early 1900s thanks to German and Chilean instructors and officers. Today, alongside the Bolivian National Police Corps, the Armed Forces marches in public parades in the following holidays:

- January 22, Plurinational State of Bolivia Anniversary
- January 29, La Paz Liberation Day
- March 23, Day of the Sea
- May 25, anniversary of the Chuquisaca Revolution
- July 17, anniversary of the La Paz revolution
- August 6, Independence Day
- August 7, Armed Forces Day
- September 14, anniversary of the Cochabamba Revolution of 1810
- September 24, anniversary of the Santa Cruz revolution of 1810
- October 12, Air Force Day
- November 6, Navy Day
- November 10, Army Day
- On the occasion of the inaugurations of the president of Bolivia
- On the foundation days of major cities

==== Brazil ====
As a former Portuguese colonial possession till independence in 1822, Brazil has almost identical traditions of military parades with the Portuguese Armed Forces with added Spanish and Dutch elements due to the long history of the lands that would become the present-day country, with additional influences from France, Germany and Italy. For many years from the Imperial era till today Brazil has witnessed parade after parade held on major national and regional holidays, a tradition maintained till today by the Brazilian Armed Forces. Since the 1960s high-stepping has been a prominent part of parades hosted by the armed forces, a tradition carried over from Portugal, Turkey and Uruguay.

Today major parades by the Armed Forces and its veterans are held on the following occasions:

- Federal holidays and service holidays marked by the Armed Forces as well as anniversaries of service arms
  - April 10, Corps of Engineers Day
  - April 12, Army Logistics Support Day
  - April 19, Army Day
  - April 21, Tiradentes Day (also Brasilia Foundation Day and Minas Gerais Day)
  - May 5, Signal Corps Day
  - May 10, Cavalry Day
  - May 24, Infantry Day
  - June 10, Artillery Day
  - June 11, Navy Day
  - August 23, Air Force Logistics Day
  - August 25, Day of the Brazilian Soldier
  - August 28, Naval Aviation Day
  - September 7, Independence Day
  - October 23, Aviators' Day
  - November 15, Day of the Proclamation of the Republic
  - November 19, Flag Day
  - December 13, Day of the Brazilian Sailor
- State and territorial holidays
  - January 4, Rondônia Day
  - March 6, anniversary of the beginning of the Pernambucan revolt
  - March 25, Ceara Slavery Abolition Day
  - April 23, Saint George's Day (in Rio de Janeiro state only)
  - June 15, Acre State Anniversary Day
  - July 2, Bahia Independence Day
  - July 8, Sergipe Political Emancipation Day
  - July 9, anniversary of the outbreak of the 1932 São Paulo Constitutionalist Revolution
  - July 28, Maranhão Admission Day
  - August 5, Paraíba Day
  - August 7, Rio Grande de Norte Day
  - August 11, Santa Catarina Day
  - September 5, Amazonas State Anniversary Day
  - September 13, Amapá Day
  - September 16, Alagoas Day
  - September 20, Day of the Gauchos of Rio Grande do Sul
  - October 5, Roraima Day and Tocantis Day (within the aforementioned states)
  - October 11, anniversary of the establishment of Mato Grosso do Sul
  - October 19, Piauí State Anniversary
  - October 23, Goias State Anniversary
  - December 19, Paraná State Anniversary
- During unitwide anniversaries and remembrance days of important battles of the Armed Forces
- During change of command, retirement and recruit and cadet graduation parades within the service branches of the armed forces and all military academies and high schools
- During anniversaries and holidays marked by the cities and towns of Brazil
- On January 1, day of the presidential inauguration ceremony
- During inauguration ceremonies of state governors, city and municipal chief executives

Alongside the armed forces the following uniformed organizations, together with representatives from educational institutions and athletes, also participate in every parade:

- National Public Security Force
- Federal Police of Brazil
- Federal Highway Police
- Federal Railroad Police
- National Prison Department
- all state Military Police formations
- all state Military Firefighters Corps
- All state Civil Police formations
- All Municipal Guards formations of cities and towns
- State, city and municipal civilian fire services and volunteer fire units

==== Brunei ====
The Bruneian parade tradition shares in the general traditions of the Commonwealth, and it is without any doubt that the British Armed Forces helped develop the parade and ceremonial traditions of the nation, which are today held in high esteem by the country's uniformed organizations combined with later Malaysian influence. Today, the Royal Brunei Armed Forces and the Royal Brunei Police Force host public parades on the following dates:

- 18 January, Police Day
- 23 February, National Day
- 31 May, Armed Forces Day
- 15 July, Birthday of HM the Sultan

Extraordinary parades are held on Accession Day, 27 October.

Parades held on February 23 and July 15 also feature service personnel of British Forces Brunei including elements of the Brigade of Gurkhas and the following:

- Brunei Fire and Rescue Department
- Brunei Prisons Department
- Brunei Immigration and Registration Department
- Royal Department of Customs and Excise
- Armed Forces Military Cadet Corps
- Police Force Cadet Corps
- Fire and Rescue Cadets
- Brunei Scout Association
- Girl Guides Association of Brunei Darussalam
- Brunei Darussalam Red Crescent Society
- National Service Programme cadets

==== Canada ====
Within Canada, the now tri-service Ceremonial Guard performs the marchpast for senior dignitaries of the Canadian Armed Forces during change of command ceremonies and state arrival ceremonies, typically held in Ottawa, the national capital. The two Primary Reserve Canadian Army regiments that typically provide personnel for the guard, the Governor General's Foot Guards and The Canadian Grenadier Guards, together with the Governor General's Horse Guards and guard of honour detachments from both the Royal Canadian Navy and the Royal Canadian Air Force take part in these events. In addition, the CG and optionally both the GGHG and the CGG take part in military parades such as the more common Trooping the Colour, also in Ottawa and special parades during the jubilee years of the monarch or of a national foundation. The CAF personnel, as well as the Canadian Cadet Organizations and military veterans also parade during national holidays such as Remembrance Day, Victoria Day, Canada Day or Canadian Forces Day, as well as during parades celebrating anniversaries of regiments, brigade groups or wings, and divisional level formations and passing out parades of the Royal Military College of Canada, Royal Military College Saint-Jean and recruit training bases, as well as in local holidays in the provinces and major cities. Across the country, the annual Warriors Day military parade has since 1921, been a traditional event of the Canadian National Exhibition. It is specifically devoted to formally recognising veterans of the CF. Like in the UK, the regimental march of the unit being honoured is played by the band and/or pipe band if present.

==== Chile ====
The tradition of military parades in Chile has origins not just in Spanish tradition, but also a mix between those of France, the United Kingdom, and particularly Germany, given the fact that Imperial German Army officers trained the army and navy in the mid-1890s in the Prussian-German traditions of military parades that are continued until today.

Currently, the Chilean Armed Forces and the Carabineros de Chile hold public parades in front of state leaders and the public on

- 21 May – Navy Day – honoring the fallen of the 1879 Battle of Iquique, also marked as a day to celebrate the service personnel, veterans, heroes and martyrs of the Chilean Navy
- 19 September – Army Day – while honoring the 1810 anniversary of the formal inauguration of the First Government Junta, is also marked as a day to celebrate the service personnel, veterans, heroes and martyrs of the Chilean Army

Local level parades are marked on the following days aside from 21 May:

- 4 February – anniversary of the victorious Capture of Valdivia
- 17 February – anniversary of the victory in the Battle of Chacabuco
- 21 March – Air Force Day
- 2 April – anniversary of the victory in the Battle of Maipu
- 27 April – Carabineros Day
- 7 June – anniversary of the victory in the Battle of Arica
- 16 June – Chilean Marine Corps Day
- 9 July – Flag Day
- 20 August – birthday of Bernardo O'Higgins
- 18 September – Independence Day
- 2 October – anniversary of the Battle of Rancagua
- 2 November – anniversary of the victory in the Battle of Pisagua
- 30 November – Chilean Gendarmerie Day

==== China ====
The first military parade in China can be dated to over 4,000 years ago, when Yu the Great, a legendary ruler in ancient China, hosted a gathering of tribal forces from northern and southern China.

===== People's Republic of China =====
External videos
- Parts 1 2 3 and 4 of a documentary on the history of Chinese military parades
- 1981 新疆 大阅兵 Chinese Uighur Military Parade in Xinjiang (Eng narration)

The People's Republic of China holds extraordinary military parades in Beijing to celebrate National Day. The first parade of this nature took place right after the proclamation of the People's Republic of China by Chairman Mao Zedong on 1 October 1949. Originally celebrated annually, the parade was suspended in 1960, before returning in 1984 to mark the 35th anniversary of the founding of the People's Republic of China. It is now held to mark every tenth anniversary, starting in 1999. Parades were also held in 1964, 1966, 1969 and 1970.

In 2015, China held a military parade to celebrate the 70th anniversary of the victory over Japan. This was the first time China held a military parade for an event other than its National Day.

In 2017, the 90th anniversary since the Nanchang Uprising and the beginning of the People's Liberation Army was marked by a military parade, the first time ever that a military parade had been held in its honor and the first time it was held outside of the capital, having been held at Zhurihe Training Base in Inner Mongolia under the direction of General Han Weiguo of the Central Theater Command. This was also the first field parade to take place since September 1981 when a parade consisting of troops participated in an exercise in Zhangjiakou in the presence of Deng Xiaoping to commemorate Deng's assumption to the post of Chairman of the Central Military Commission. During that parade, Deng reportedly said "Let's hold a large-scale one if we are to hold a military exercise, so that it can be of use" in reference to the size of the parade. Naval parades have also been reintroduced in recent years with a parade (which was the biggest naval review since 1949 and according to the Chinese government, the biggest in 600 years.) being held in the South China Sea in 2018 and a parade for the platinum jubilee of the People's Liberation Army Navy being held in early 2019.

Smaller scale parades are also periodically held in Hong Kong, Macau. The first military parades in the HKSAR and the MSAR took place on their first and fifth anniversaries in 1998 and 2004 respectively.

===== Republic of China =====
In the Republic of China (Taiwan), the Republic of China Armed Forces held its national parades in Taipei from 1949 until 1991 during the Double Ten Day celebrations. This practice was abandoned in 1991 though parades were recently held every five years beginning in 2011 during the Xinhai Revolution centenary and again in 2016. Special parades were held outside Taipei in 1995 and 2015 marking the 50th and 70th anniversaries, respectively, of both the Allied victory in the Second World War and the conclusion of the Second Sino-Japanese War.

==== Colombia ====
Both the Military Forces of Colombia and the National Police of Colombia hold important national parades to celebrate the anniversary of national independence as well as of the Armed Forces. Such parades are a mix of the Spanish, German, French, American and British influences owing to the long history of the country's military and police forces. National level parades are held on:

- February 15 – Air Force Day
- July 20 – Independence Day
- July 24 – Navy Day
- August 7 – Army Day and Battle of Boyaca Victory Day
- November 15 – National Police Day

Local level parades by the personnel and veterans of the armed forces and police are held on the following:

- April 7 – Barranquilla Day
- July 3 – Cali Independence Day
- November 11 – Cartagena Independence Day

==== Cuba ====
The Cuban Revolutionary Armed Forces generally holds military parades in honor of the Day of the Cuban Armed Forces and the Triumph of the Revolution on Havana's Plaza de la Revolución. The first parade took place in 1960 for the latter event and over time, importance was transferred to Armed Forces Day in relation to military parades. In 2011, a special honor parade was held on April 16 to commemorate the golden jubilee since the 1961 Bay of Pigs Invasion. The largest parade to be held took place in December 1986 in honor of the 30th anniversary of the revolution, in which General Humberto Ortega from Nicaragua, as well as officials from the Soviet Union, attended. The diamond jubilee parade planned for 2016 was postponed for 1 month due to the death and state funeral of Fidel Castro, and took place during the Victory Day celebrations on 2 January 2017.

==== Czech Republic ====
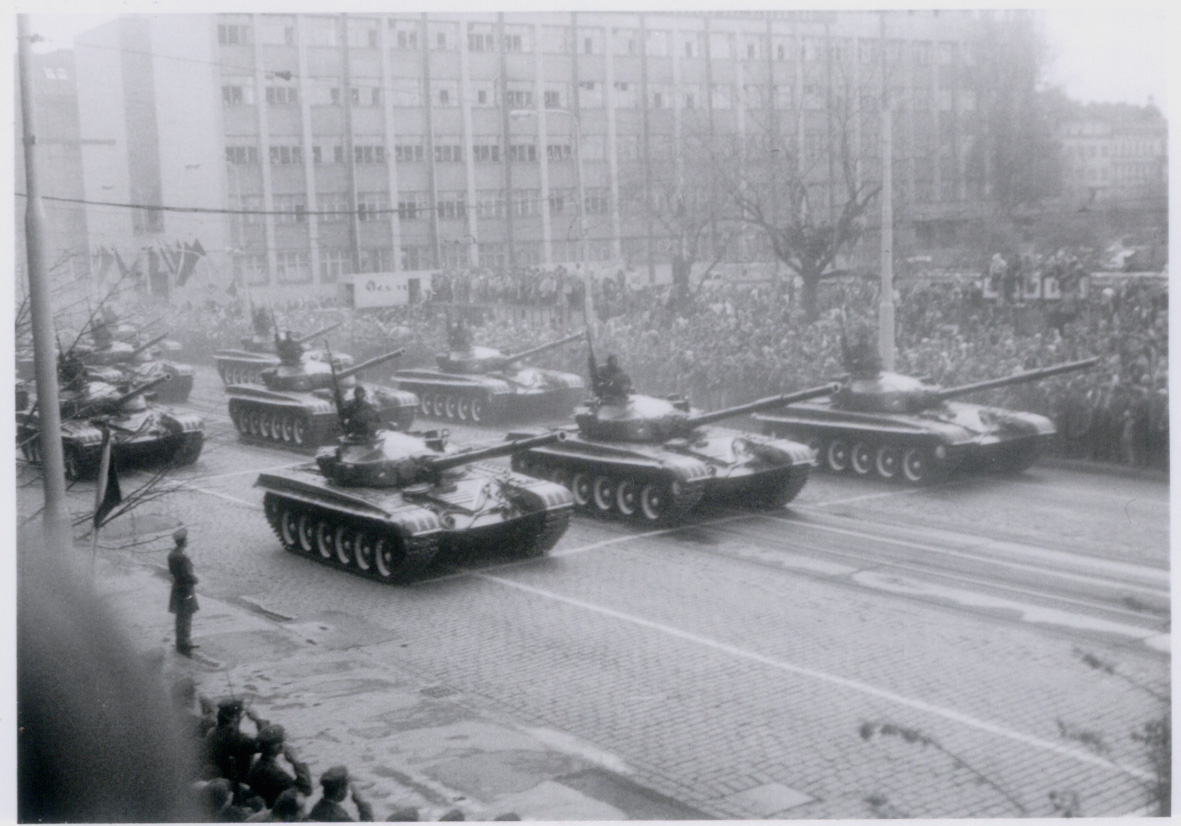
A parade of tanks of the ČSLA in Prague on Victory Day, 9 May 1985

External videos
- Czechoslovak Military Parade "Shield-84" – Vojenská přehlídka ČSLA "Štít-84

Large military parades in the Czech Republic are today held every 10 years in the capital of Prague, encompassing personnel from the Czech Army and the Police of the Czech Republic. The first of these parades occurred in 2008 in honor of the founding of Czechoslovakia on 28 October 1918. Another one took place in 2018 and included foreign troops.

Prior to 1918, military parades followed the tradition of their larger sovereign entity, including the military tradition of Austria-Hungary. Regular military parades were held during the period of the Czechoslovak Socialist Republic, with the first parades being organized in the 1950s. The first parade of the Czechoslovak People's Army (ČSLA) took place in 1951 in Letná. Since then, parades were held every five years on 9 May to mark the end of World War II and the liberation of Czechoslovakia. To honor the latter's celebrations, the State Anthem of the Soviet Union would be performed by the massed bands on parade preceded by the Czechoslovak national anthem. The last of these parades took place in 1985.

==== Ecuador ====
Both the Armed Forces of Ecuador and the National Police of Ecuador hold important national parades to celebrate the anniversaries of national independence as well as of the Armed Forces and Police. National level parades are held on the following days:

- February 27 – Army Day
- May 24 – Armed Forces Day, the anniversary of the victory in the 1822 Battle of Pichincha
- July 26 – Navy Day
- August 10 – the anniversary of the Luz de America
- October 9 – Guayaquil Independence Day
- October 27 – Air Force Day
- November 3 – Cueca Independence Day
- November 18 – Loja Independence Day

Local military and police parades are held on major city and provincial anniversaries as well as on township foundation days.

==== Estonia ====
The first military parade was held in Estonia on 24 February 1919, a year after the Declaration of Independence, while the War of Independence was still ongoing.

During the period of Soviet occupation from 1944 to 1991, October Parades (Estonian: Oktoobriparaad) were held on 7 November, on Freedom Square, Tallinn, then known as Victory Square.

After the restoration of independence, the first military parade was held on 24 February 1992, on the country's 74th anniversary. Since then, the Estonian Defence Forces and the Estonian Defence League, as successors to the military and reserve forces of the pre-war republic, march during a combination of Russian, Finnish and Western drill in parades held on the following days:

- February 24 – Independence Day
- June 24 – Victory Day

During the 2006 Victory Day Parade in Saaremaa, the first-ever Fleet Review of the Estonian Navy in Estonian history was conducted by the Estonian Defence League.

==== Finland ====
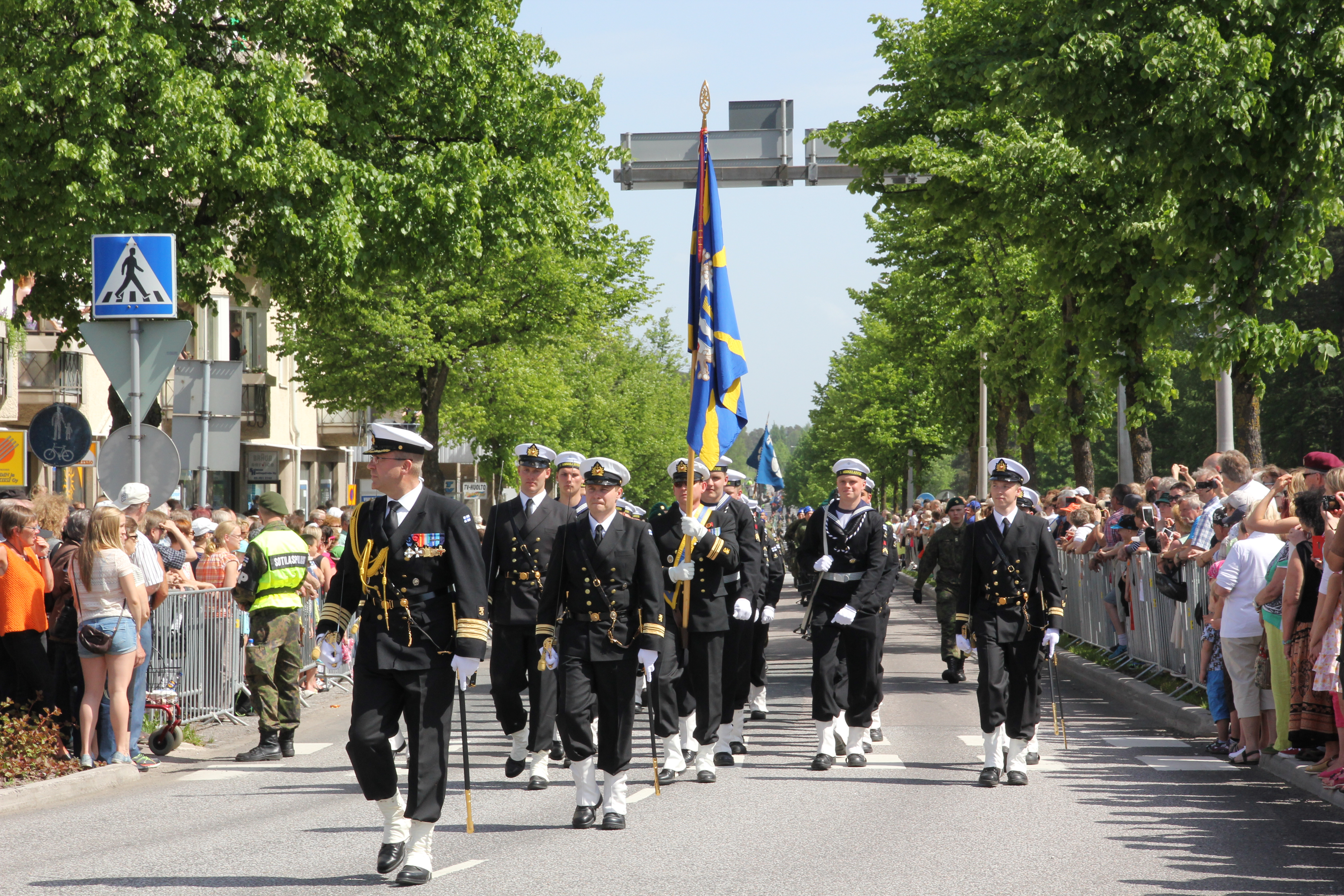
The Nyland Brigade (Finnish: Uudenmaan prikaati) at the 2014 flag day parade on Valtakatu street in Lappeenranta, Finland

The parade traditions of Finland can be traced to the Swedish period, and later on during Russian administration, wherein the local formations adopted a few of the Russian parade traditions in tandem with the Swedish tradition and local practices. Today the Finnish Defence Forces hosts a national paraded every year on the following dates:

- June 4, Defence Forces Flag Day and birthday of Marshal of Finland Baron Carl Gustaf Emil Mannerheim
- December 6, Independence Day

The national parades are held in a host city selected for the year, and typically include military units from all three services, the Finnish Border Guard and reserve units, as well as contingents from the National Defence Training Association of Finland and other voluntary national defence organisations, and contingents of civilian authorities, e.g. the Police of Finland. Helsinki hosts the flag day parade in years ending in a 2 or a 7.

Units of the Defence Forces may organise local, smaller parades to celebrate particular events. On the day of swearing their military oath, Finnish conscripts graduating their basic training typically march in a small parade within their garrison or in a local town.

Regardless of size, the Finnish military parade consists of the inspection of troops, a moment of worship and a pass in review. The senior officer receiving the parade formally inspects and greets the assembled troops, and delivers an address to those in attendance. All troops, including motorised units, are usually dismounted for the inspection. This is followed by a sermon given by a military chaplain, concluded by an anthem sung by the troops. After this, the troops pass in review, marching at a pace of 120 steps per minute, units either in three or four files and vehicles in a single column.

==== France ====
The annual military parade in the French capital of Paris is held on July 14 during the Bastille Day holiday. It is currently the oldest and largest military parade on the European continent. It is held on the Champs-Élysées and passes from l'Arc de Triomphe to Place de la Concorde. Bastille Day parades are also held in smaller garrison towns such as Toulon and Belfort. The 1st Infantry Regiment of the French Republican Guard regularly performs ceremonial marchpasts in is role as the guard of honour for the president of the French Republic. Like the British, many French units have the ability to march in quick time, while only one – the French Foreign Legion – marches uniquely in slow time, while another unit of the armed forces marches in very quick time and that is of the Army's Chasseurs, especially its Chasseurs alpins.

In addition to the Armed Forces (including the National Guard) and the occasional participation of its veterans, the following take part in the national parade:

- National Police
- Fire services of the Ministry of the Interior
- Security Service of the Ministry of the Interior
- French Prisons Service
- Directorate-General of Customs and Indirect Taxes

Local parades are held on the following days:

- May 8 – Victory in Europe Day
- November 11 – Armistice Day
- Anniversaries of important battles fought by the French Armed Forces

==== Germany ====
Germany has had a long tradition of military parades dating back to the days of Kingdom of Prussia and its army and navy. It was the Prussians who invented the goose step, a style of marching that was used in many German armies as well as in the militaries of various countries, which were instructed by Prussian military training officers and instructors from the 19th century to the early 20th. Its traditions were also carried on in a number of former crown dominions in Prussian lands, including Hanover and the Rhineland, as well as in the allied Kingdom of Württemberg and the Kingdom of Saxony, the grand duchies, duchies and principalities, and the city-state military forces of Bremen and Hamburg. In Bavaria, a mix of the Prussian and Austrian practice in tandem with its local traditions was kept.

During the Nazi era, military parades were commonplace as they were held as a sort of victory parade for the German Wehrmacht as they invaded countries before and during the Second World War, as well as an expression of national pride in the armed forces, who together with the SS and the SA, as well as the other Nazi party uniformed organizations, formed part of the parades in the mid-1930s. The first major parades took place in Nuremberg in September 1938 and Adolf Hitler's 50th birthday in April 1939. In the months Immediately after the German invasion of Poland, a joint German–Soviet military parade took place in Brest-Litovsk (now Brest, Belarus). In Allied-occupied Germany, the major powers held parades through the center of Berlin to honor their victory. These include the Berlin Victory Parade of 1945, 1945 British Berlin Victory Parade and Berlin Victory Parade of 1946.

In the communist German Democratic Republic (GDR), parades were held according to the Russian standard, although the Soviet Army allowed the East Germans, through the National People's Army and the Border Troops of the German Democratic Republic, to use the Prussian tradition, something that had been dropped by their West German counterparts in the 1950s. In the GDR, parades were held on the following occasions:

- NVA Day (3 March)
- International Workers' Day (1 May)
- Tag der Befreiung (8 May)
- Tag der Republik (7 October)

The first parade took place on 1 May 1956 in the presence of President Wilhelm Pieck. In the 1960s and early 1970s, parades took place on the western half of the Palace of the Republic, which was intended as a military parade ground, even though tremors from the heavy vehicles proved dangerous due to the glass facade. By 1979, the western half was used mainly as a parking lot and military parades were moved to Karl-Marx-Allee in central Berlin. A special parade was held on 13 August 1986 to mark the silver jubilee since construction on the Berlin Wall began, and the parade involved not just the NVA and the Grenztruppen but also the Felix Dzerzhinsky Guards Regiment and battalions of the Combat Groups of the Working Class.

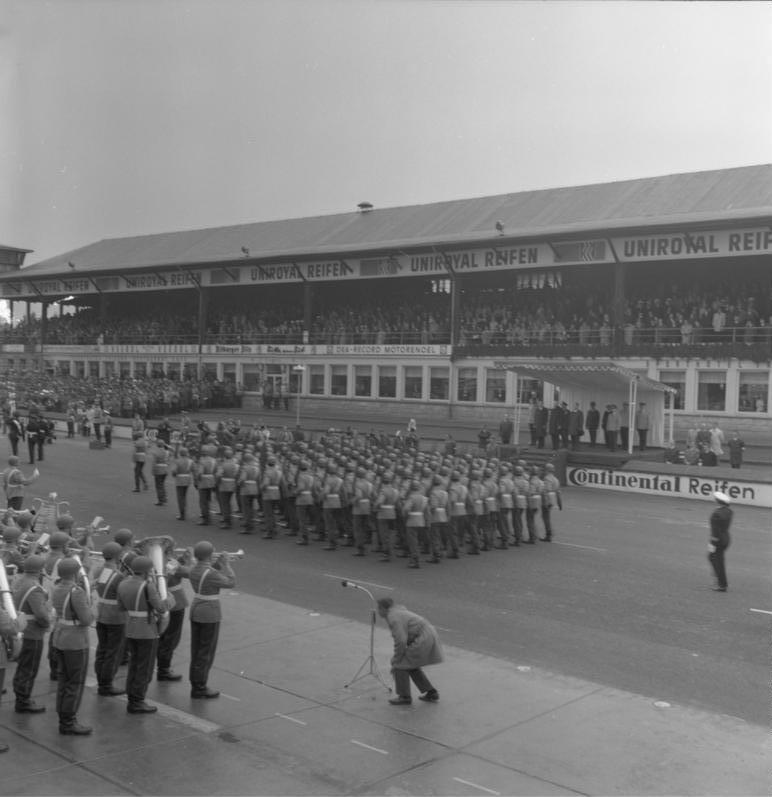
Bundeswehr personnel on the Nürburgring

In 1969, the first military parade of West Germany and later the entire Federal Republic of Germany was held on the Nürburgring in the town of Nürburg, Rhineland-Palatinate. It took place on 6 June 1969 and was held to commemorate the 20th anniversary of both the establishment of the North Atlantic Treaty Organization (NATO) and creation of the Federal Republic in the West. It was attended by Kurt Georg Kiesinger in his position as Federal Chancellor of Germany. Participating foreign and national units included those from the Bundeswehr, Canadian Forces Europe, United States Army Europe, as well as army contingents from France and the United Kingdom. Allied parades were also held later in the country's 40-year existence.

Today, military parades are held on the following holidays on a smaller scale:

- Remembrance Day of July 20
- German Unity Day (October 3)
- Passing out parades of NCO training schools and officer training institutions

==== Greece ====
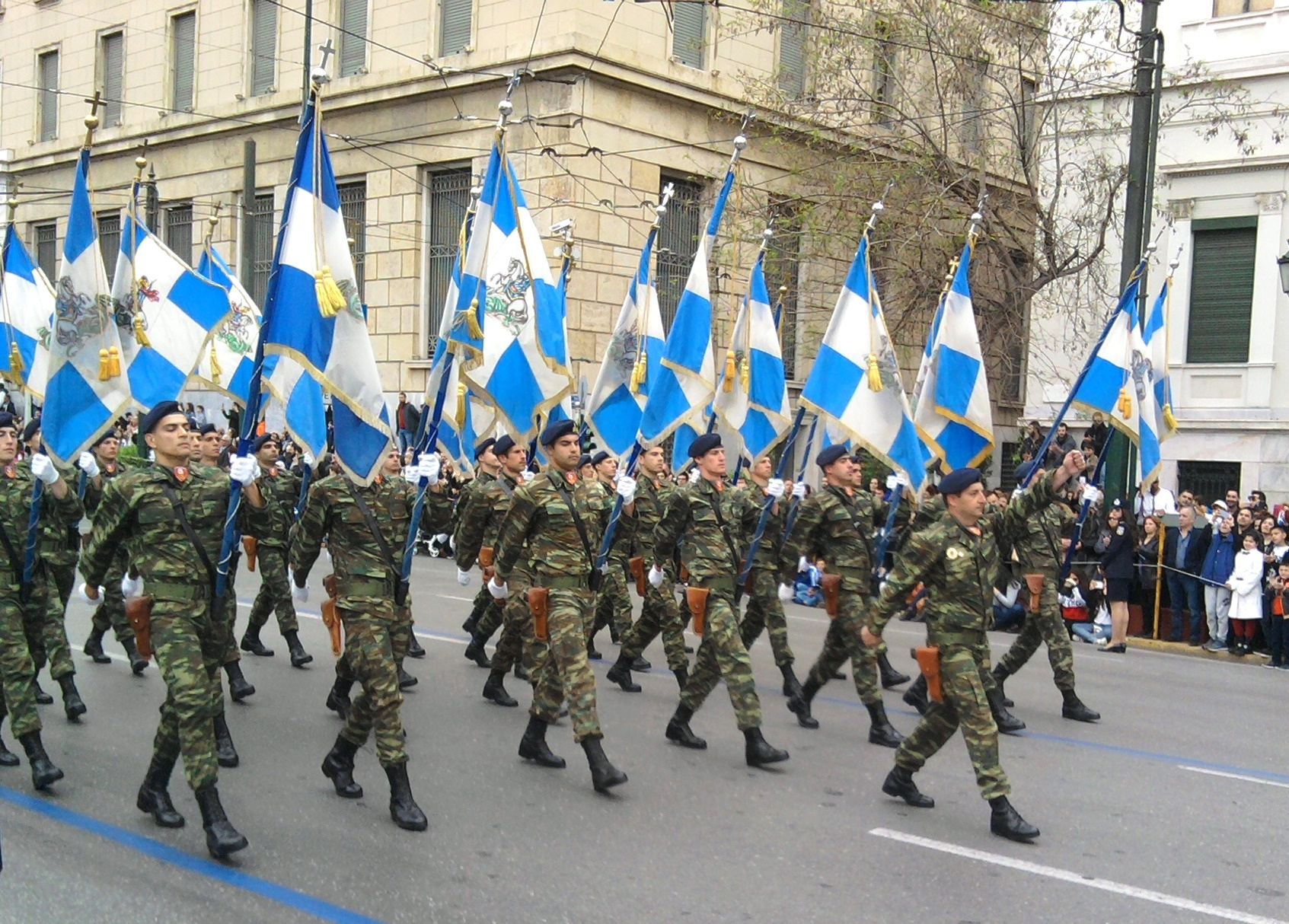
25th March military parade in Greece

The long history of the Hellenic Armed Forces and the role played in the defense and progress of the country are remembered with grand military parades held in major cities in the country following a hybrid of the British, French, Danish and German traditions on the following dates:

- 25 March – Independence Day
- 28 October – Ohi Day
- On Liberation Days of major cities and towns, honoring the Greek fallen of the Second World War and the later Greek Civil War

==== India ====
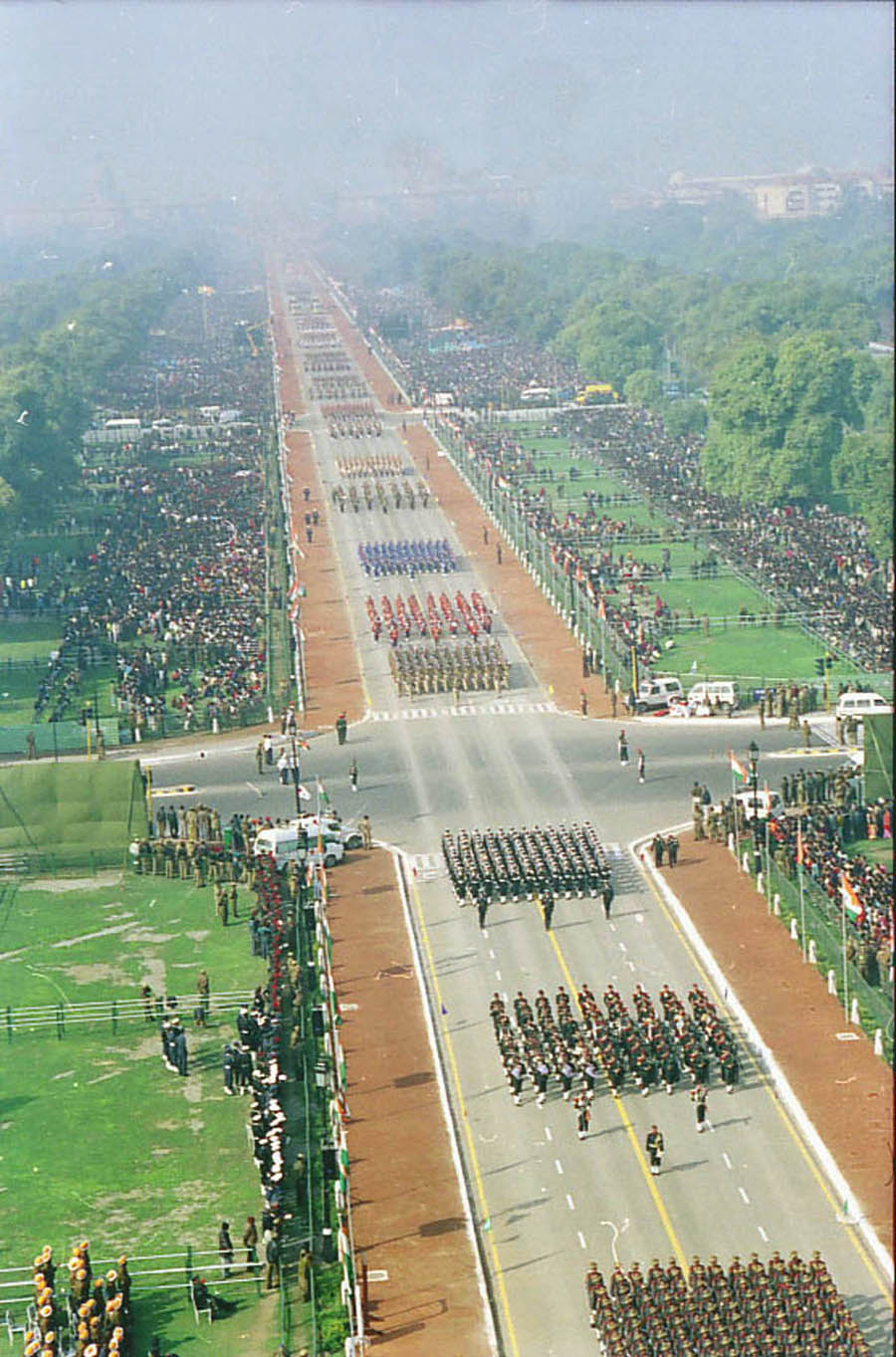
An overview of the 55th Republic Day Parade from India Gate in New Delhi

The tradition of military parades in India dates back to the medieval times as celebrations to honor Hindu gods in gratitude to victories against enemies. By the time of the Mughal Empire, with the introduction of gunpower weapons came the first European settlers, the Portuguese, in what is now Daman and Diu and Goa states, and the Portuguese Army, who introduced the modern form of parades to this country. These followed by servicemen from what is now The Netherlands, Ancien Régime France and the United Kingdom thru the East India Company (from the 17th century) and beginning from the 19th century the British Army, Royal Marines and the Royal Navy. Between these four countries, it was the UK that influenced the Indian military ceremonial tradition the most, as Hindu, Sikh, Tamil and Gurkha regiments, as well as a number of regiments from other races, whether be infantry, cavalry, artillery or engineers, alongside locally recruited seamen, were instructed in the British parade drill with adaptations to Indian conditions. They maintain the very same traditions today in the current Indian Armed Forces, and the current drills are a modernized form of those used beginning in 1895, the year of the foundation of the modern Indian Army, with parades having been held during the Delhi Durbars of 1903 and 1911 as well as during the King's Official Birthday in June.

Since 1951 the Republic Day parade has held annually in Delhi to mark India's Republic Day, celebrating the enactment in that day in 1950 of the Constitution of India. It is the country's principal military parade honoring the Armed Forces for its long record of service to the country and is also a showcase of the achievements of India's defence industry, with a number of vehicles and aircraft featured being locally produced by factories under the Ministry of Defence and by local defense production firms. Parades are also held on the service holidays of the Armed Forces:

- 15 January, Army Day
- 8 October, Air Force Day
- 4 December, Navy Day

In 2020, Captain Tania Shergill became the first female parade adjutant to lead a contingent at an Army Day parade.

Alongside the Armed Forces and its veterans the national Republic Day Parade in Delhi, as well as regional parades held on this day and on 15 August, Independence Day, features the participation of the following uniformed organizations:

- National Cadet Corps
- Youth representatives of the National Service Scheme
- Indian Coast Guard
- Assam Rifles
- all state and territorial police forces, including State Armed Police
- Border Security Force
- Indo-Tibetan Border Police
- Sashastra Seema Bal
- National Security Guard
- Central Industrial Security Force
- Central Reserve Police Force
- Railway Protection Force
- all municipal, city, state and territorial fire services

Special parades are held on:

- The passing out and graduation ceremonies of all military and police training and educational institutions
- Passing out and graduation parades of regimental centres
- Presentation of military and police colours
- Unit anniversaries

==== Korea ====
===== North Korea =====
All military parades of the Korean People's Army (KPA) and the Worker-Peasant Red Guards (WPRG) are centered in the national capital of Pyongyang and have a long tradition that goes back to the DPRK's establishment in 1948. Between 1993 and 2011, the DPRK held over a dozen military parades, which was frequent compared to the 1960s–80s, during which only three parades were held. Known for its elaborate military drill, the country holds military parades annually on different dates (especially on jubilee years), which feature a combination of Chinese and Russian techniques. North Korean military parades are held on the following dates:

- 8 February – Military Foundation Day
- 15 April – Day of the Sun
- 25 April – Revolutionary Army Day
- 27 July – Day of Victory in the Great Fatherland Liberation War
- 15 August – Liberation Day
- 9 September – Day of the Foundation of the Republic
- 10 October – Party Foundation Day

Drill rehearsals for female soldiers participating in the 2011 Republic Day Parade

Rehearsals for these parades usually take place three to six weeks prior to the actual parade at the Mirim Parade Training Facility in the capital. The actual parades are held in the capital's Kim Il-sung Square.

In addition, non-jubilee holiday parades have been mounted on the grounds of the Kumsusan Palace of the Sun on these days plus on:

- 16 February – Day of the Shining Star
- 25 August – Day of Songun
- 21 December – Death Anniversary of Kim Jong-il

Alongside the KPA and WPRG, also taking part are the policemen and women of the Ministry of Social Security's Korean People's Social Security Forces (which also includes border police). In 2015 the Korean Children's Union made an inaugural appearance in the parade celebrating the 70th anniversary of the Workers' Party of Korea, forming the rear contingent of the military parade ground column made up of middle and junior high school students who are part of the KCU's Young Pioneer Corps. The first ever modern KCU parade, including cadets from the Mangyongdae and Kang Pang Sok Revolutionary Schools, was held in Kim Il-sung Stadium in 2012.

===== South Korea =====
The tradition of parades in South Korea began in 1946, with the first ever parades of what is now the Republic of Korea Armed Forces, alongside personnel of the United States Forces Korea, whose traditions would shape the young armed forces' parade and ceremonial practices till this day mixed with the Japanese practice (due to the long period of Japanese rule over the peninsula). Today, that tradition is mixed with those of the other armed services under United Nations Command that fought with them against the KPA, the People's Volunteer Army and the Soviet Air Forces during the Korean War. The parade tradition is also coupled as a showcase for the national defense industry as well, with many of the military equipment being featured being of national manufacture, and locally composed military marches being featured in the repertoire of the military bands that are a staple of these events.

As of the present the ROKAF marches in public parades in the following occasions:

- March 1, Day of the Independence Movement
- April 13, Provisional Government of the Republic of Korea Foundation Day
- April 15, Republic of Korea Marine Corps Birthday
- June 6, Memorial Day
- June 25, anniversary of the beginning of the Korean War
- July 27, anniversary of the Korean War Armistice of 1953
- August 15, National Liberation Day of Korea
- September 5, Republic of Korea Army Day
- October 1, Armed Forces Day (principal holiday of the Armed Forces) and Air Force Day
- October 3, Gaecheonjeol
- November 11, Republic of Korea Navy Day
- On the occasion of change of command, retirement and recruit and cadet graduation parades within the service branches of the armed forces, military academies, all officer candidate schools and recruit training institutions
- On the occasion of the inaugurations of the president of South Korea

The October 1 parade and related celebrations, while being not a public holiday but a National Flag Raising Day mandated by law, serve as the principal day of gratitude to the ROKAF and its veterans for service to the nation at large and to all Koreans abroad, and thus the ROKAF only marches in public parades on this day with Seoul, the national capital, hosting the national parades (large major parades on this day are held every 5th year since the 1948 foundation of the republic, a tradition that began in 1998). On other holidays, the following organizations march with the armed forces, all cadet formations under the Reserve Officers' Training Corps (South Korea) and the Republic of Korea Reserve Forces:

- National Police Agency
- Korea Coast Guard
- National Fire Agency of the Republic of Korea
- All local and regional firefighting services
- Korea Forest Service
- Korea Customs Service
- Railway Police of the Ministry of Land, Infrastructure and Transport
- Korea Immigration Service
- Korea Scout Association
- Girl Scouts Korea
- Foreign armed forces' veterans organizations stationed within the republic

==== Mexico ====
Both the Mexican Armed Forces and the National Guard hold important national parades to celebrate the anniversary of national independence. The tradition began in 1924 and the principal national parade on the Zocalo square in Mexico City was made a permanent yearly event in 1935.

Parades are also held every Cinco de Mayo and on Revolution Day, 20 November.

==== Mongolia ====
Military parades in Mongolia have a long tradition that dates back to the era of the Mongol Empire. Today they closely follow the Russian model with some modifications such as trooping of the flag of Mongolia in a car rather than by foot. A Dangjiren is based on a cavalry military parade of the Mongols that were held in the 17th century.

The first official military parade in Communist Mongolia took place in 1921 in honor of the victories of Damdin Sükhbaatar in the People's Revolution. The anniversary parades that followed have been held on jubilee years (specifically in 1946, 1951, 1956, 1961, 1966, 1971, 1976, 1981, 1986 and 1991). After 1991, the practice was abandoned with the exception of 1996 when a parade in the National Sports Stadium commemorated the 790th anniversary of the founding of Mongolia and the 75th anniversary of the People's Revolution. After a nine-year break, the 2005 inauguration ceremony of Nambaryn Enkhbayar served as an event to hold a military parade on the central square. This took place again in 2009 for the inauguration of Tsakhiagiin Elbegdorj. That same year, State Flag Day was introduced as a national holiday, which would also be celebrated with a parade.

Military parades of the Mongolian Armed Forces on Sükhbaatar Square or in Choibalsan take place on the following occasions:

- 18 March – Soldiers Day
- 10 July – Mongolian State Flag Day
- 1 September – Anniversary of the Battle of Khalkin Gol
- Inauguration of the president of Mongolia
- Graduations of the National Defense University

External videos
- The 70th anniversary parade of the People's Revolution of 1921
- Mongolian Military Parade 2011

During Mongolia's socialist period, annual civil/military parades of the Mongolian People's Army took place until 1991, celebrating the following occasions:

- 1 May – International Workers' Day
- 11 July – Day of the People's Revolution of 1921
- 7 November – October Revolution Day

During these events, party and government leaders were viewed ascending to the top of Sükhbaatar's Mausoleum to take the salute.

Alongside the Armed Forces today's parades also involve personnel of the National Police Agency, the Internal Troops of Mongolia, the General Authority for Border Protection and the National Emergency Management Agency.

==== Pakistan ====
Soldiers of Pakistan's Special Services Group

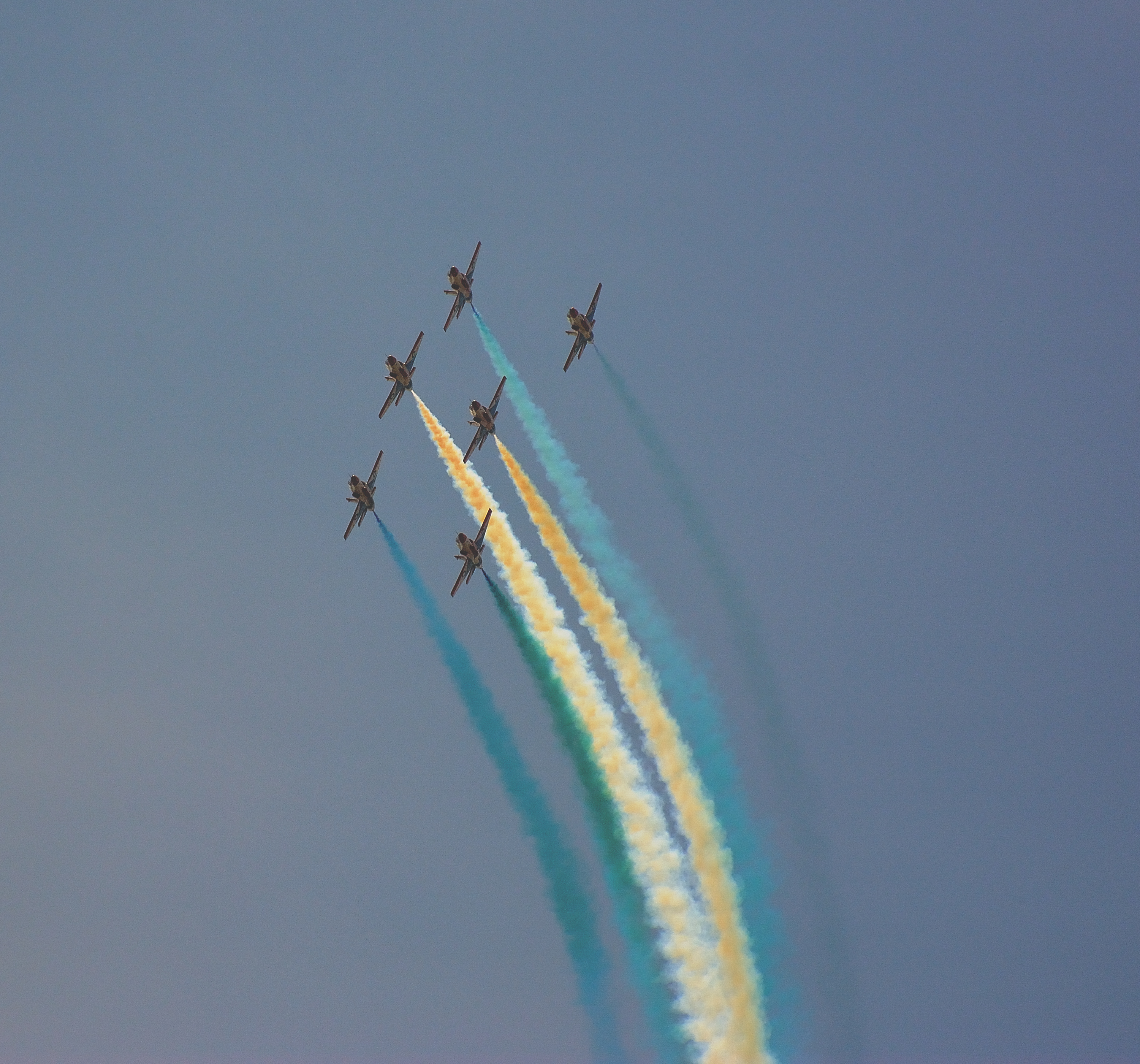
The Sherdils of Pakistan Air Force performing the acrobats in Islamabad

The Pakistan Day Parade, also known as the National Day Joint Services Parade, is an annual event held at Shakarparian in Islamabad to commemorate the Pakistan Day on 23 March, marking the anniversary of the 1940 Lahore Resolution. The parade is presided over by the President of Pakistan and the Prime Minister of Pakistan, alongside the Chairman Joint Chiefs of Staff Committee, and the Chiefs of the Army, Navy, and Air Force. Foreign dignitaries often attend as special guests. The event is organised by Joint Staff Headquarters and showcases the country's military strength and national unity.

The first Republic Day parade, as it was then called, was held on 23 March 1956 to mark the day when Pakistan became a republic on the same day. The parade was held at Karachi where newly appointed President of Pakistan Iskander Ali Mirza took salute.

==== Paraguay ====
It was the armed services of Brazil, Argentina and Uruguay that helped develop the traditions of military parades in Paraguay following the devastating Paraguayan War, resulting in the introduction of certain traditions beginning in the early 20th century, which would later be infused with German, Italian and French influence. Before that war, however, they were quite few parades with primarily Spanish influences. The first major parade ever to be held in the 20th century in this country was on August 22, 1935, celebrating the victory won in the Chaco War against the Bolivian Armed Forces. In the 1940s and 1950s, German goose-stepping had been adopted in a limited scale thanks to Chilean instructors in the Francisco López Military Academy, the Acosta Ñu Military High School and the National Police Academy.

Today the Armed Forces of Paraguay stages massive military parades in Asunción, the national capital, together with the police on the following days:

- May 14, Independence Day
- June 12, Chaco War Victory Day
- July 24, Army Day
- September 12, Navy Day
- September 22, Victory Day in the Battle of Curupayty
- September 29, Victory Day in the Battle of Boqueron
- November 6, Air Force Day

In addition, a local parade is held every August 15 in honor of the anniversary of the foundation of the city of Asunción and the Catholic Feast of the Assumption of Mary. Almost all parades are televised nationally.

==== Peru ====
The Peruvian Armed Forces and the National Police of Peru holds the yearly Great Military Parade of Peru every July 29 in Lima as the armed services' way of honoring the anniversary of national independence and the role they have played in shaping the history of the country. Together with these two services the Peruvian Volunteer Firefighters Corps and Peruvian National Penitentiary Institute also take part as well. Local level Independence Day parades are held on pre-determined days before July 28 and 29 as set by their respective local governments.

Parades held by service personnel and veterans of the armed forces are also marked on:

- June 7 – Flag Day and Battle of Arica Memorial Day
- June 26 – Air Force Day
- September 24 – Armed Forces Day
- October 8 – Navy Day
- December 9 – Army Day and the anniversary of the Battle of Ayacucho

==== Philippines ====
The tradition of military parades in the Philippines traces its origins to the military parades held since the late 1700s in honor of the inaugurations of the governors general of the Philippines, with troops provided by formations of the Spanish Army, Spanish Navy and the Spanish Marine Infantry, composed of personnel from Spain and her other colonies and locally recruited personnel. Parades were also held on the anniversaries of members of the Spanish royal family and important anniversaries. It was these parades that would model the revolutionary armed forces of the young country, made up of the young Philippine Revolutionary Army and local pro-independence militias, as it performed the first ever military parade on January 23, 1899, the day of the formal establishment of the First Philippine Republic in what is now the city of Malolos in Bulacan.

Today's military parade tradition are also combined with the latter influences of the United States Armed Forces, the Philippine Constabulary and the locally raised Philippine Scouts, which held parades together with the collegiate formations of the Reserve Officers' Training Corps (raised 1912), and later on with Japanese influences during the brief Japanese occupation during the Second World War, where parades were held by servicemen of both the Imperial Japanese Army and the Imperial Japanese Navy, which high stepped before dignitaries. During the inauguration of the Second Republic on October 14, 1943, Japanese-sponsored military formations marched past in what is now Manila's National Museum Building. On July 4, 1946, the day national independence was restored as a result of the promulgation of the Treaty of Manila, the first modern military parade was held involving both US and Philippine units in historic Rizal Park in Manila, and from then on military parades of the Armed Forces of the Philippines (composed of active and reserve servicemen and women and its veterans), the Philippine National Police, successor to the traditions and history of both the Constabulary and the Integrated National Police (established 1975) and the paramilitary Philippine Coast Guard under the Department of Transportation (established in its modern form in 1967 with roots dating back to 1901 and has been a separate organization since 1998), alongside the college and university ROTC units and other components of the National Service Training Program and the secondary school cadets in Citizen's Army Training (CAT) units from both public and private institutions, are a part of national life and a big staple during major national holidays. These events are expressions of national pride and gratitude for services for the country by servicemen and women of these organizations and a demonstration of their importance to national defense and security. On July 7, 1974, the Tanghalang Francisco Balagtas opened its doors with a grand civil-military parade entitled "Kasaysayan ng Lahi" (History of the Race) in time for Miss Universe 1974, which also featured formations in historical uniforms from the pre-Spanish era up to the Second World War as well as living veterans of the latter conflict. Until 1962, parades were held on July 4, the former date of Independence Day, and the last Rizal Day parade in honor of the presidential inauguration was held in 1969. Today military parades in the Philippines, which are sometimes also televised events, are held on a number of days (local commemorations indicated in parentheses):

- January 23, First Republic Day (local commemoration)
- January 29, National Police Day
- March 23, Army Day
- April 9, Day of Valor
- May 20, Navy Day
- May 28, Flag Day
- June 12, Independence Day
- July 1, Air Force Day
- August 18, Police Service Day
- October 17, Coast Guard Day
- December 21, Armed Forces Day
- On anniversaries of important battles fought by the Armed Forces of the Philippines, including the following days:
  - February 9, Mandaluyong Liberation and Cityhood Day (local commemoration)
  - March 3, Victory Day in the Battle of Manila (local commemoration)
  - March 18, Panay Liberation Day (local commemoration)
  - March 26, Talisay Landing Day (local commemoration)
  - August 30, Battle of Pinaglabanan Day (local commemoration)
  - September 2, Victory over Japan Day (local commemoration)
  - September 12, Battle of Pulang Lupa Day (local commemoration)
  - October 20, Leyte Landing Day (local commemoration)
  - November 5, Al Cinco de Noviembre (local commemoration)
- During a change of command, retirement and recruit and cadet graduation parades within the service branches of the armed forces, the Philippine Military Academy and all officer candidate schools
- During holidays and festivals marked by each of the provinces, cities and towns
- On June 30, the date of the Philippine presidential inauguration
- During inauguration ceremonies of provincial governors and city and municipal chief executives

Parades in Metro Manila are held principally in the parade grounds of Camp Aguinaldo in Quezon City and Quirino Grandstand in Manila with the Philippine Army headquarters in Taguig and Villamor Air Base in Pasay as secondary venues. Parades are also held in the grounds of Clark Air Base in Pampanga. Regionally, the Bicol Region Military Parade held every second Friday of September in Naga, Camarines Sur, with over 19,000 youth cadets and athletes from high schools and universities, together with the Armed Forces, National Police and the Bureau of Fire Protection, all taking part, is the country's biggest parade held in honor of the festivities of Our Lady of Peñafrancia. This parade is also the longest and with such big numbers of people marching this civil-military parade is one of the largest ever to be annually held in Southeast Asia. Parades are also held in major cities in the regions during national and regional holidays.

Alongside the AFP, PNP and PCG, all ROTC units and CAT units in secondary schools (with occasional participation of athletes), also taking part in these parade are:

- Bureau of Jail Management and Penology
- Bureau of Fire Protection
- Boy Scouts of the Philippines
- Girl Scouts of the Philippines
- Military veterans
- Law enforcement and emergency veterans

==== Poland ====
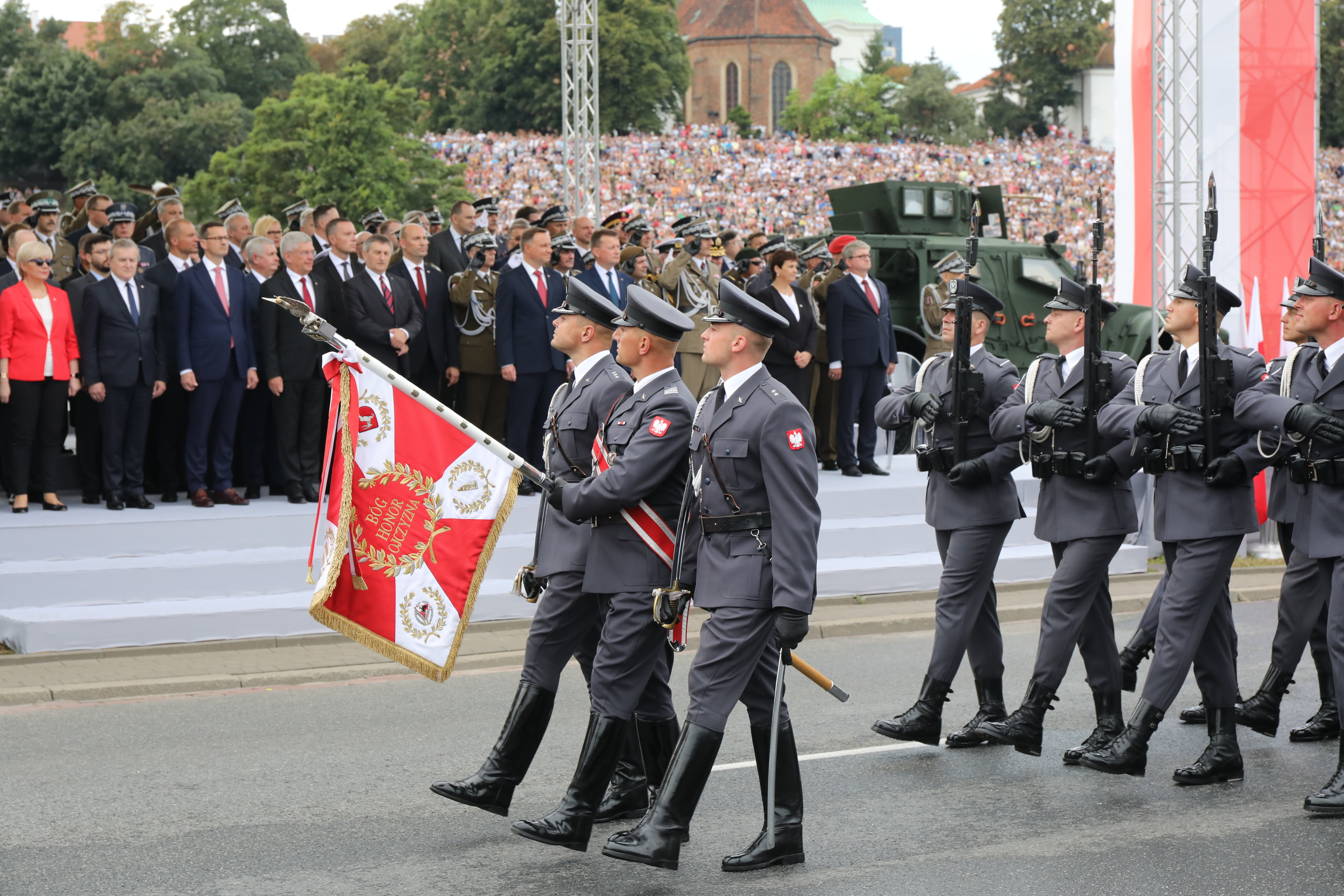
A Polish Air Force ceremonial guard during the Armed Forces Day parade

The Polish Armed Forces and the Police of Poland holds two yearly military parades (Polish: Defilada wojskowa) in the capital of Warsaw: The Armed Forces Day parade through Ujazdów Avenue and the National Independence Day parade near the Tomb of the Unknown Soldier on Piłsudski Square. Both of these parades include NATO personnel stationed near or inside the country. The Armed Forces Day parade was introduced in 2007 and 2008 as first grand military parades since the holiday was reinstated and have been held yearly since 2013. The first Polish military parade took place on 17 January 1945. Prior to 1989, parades were held in front of the Palace of Culture and Science on Parade Square on 22 July commemorate the National Day of the Rebirth of Poland celebrations, honoring the anniversary of the signing of the Stalin-sponsored PKWN Manifesto. Back then, the People's Republic of Poland used many Russian traditions in regard to military parades, especially the inspection by the minister of defence. In 1966, during the millennium celebrations of the Christianization of Poland, a parade was held on 22 July which included cadets of military academies and personnel of Polish ceremonial units dressed in historical military uniforms dating back to the Piast dynasty. A special parade was held on 9 May 1985 to honor the 40th anniversary of the Victory in Europe and the servicemen of the Polish Armed Forces in the West and the East. In 2019, a 3rd was added when the yearly 3 May Constitution Day parades, last held in 1939 and were held off and on since 1990, were officially reinstated.

Parades are held by these two organizations in major cities and provincial capitals.

Alongside these two organizations and their veterans the following also take part:

- Border Guards
- Prisons Service
- State Fire Service
- Customs Service of the National Revenue Administration
- Polish Scouting and Guiding Association
- Marshal's Guard of the Sejm (in Warsaw only)

==== Romania ====
The Romanian tradition of military parades (Parada militara/Defilada militara) dates back to the days as a kingdom, based on the traditions of Russia, Germany and Greece (and later on Hungary beginning in 1918, following the accession into the country of Transylvania). The traditions took a new form during the days as a socialist republic from 1947 to 1989, with additional Soviet influences, with August 23, Liberation from Fascist Occupation Day and also currently Black Ribbon Day, being the day of the principal parade held in Bucharest involving the Romanian People's Army celebrating the 1944 King Michael's Coup which ended years of fascist administration in Romania, one of the direct consequences of the Soviet occupation of Bessarabia and Northern Bukovina in 1940. While the first parade was held in 1945 the first anniversary of the coup and as a celebration of the Allied victory in the Second World War in Europe, the final parade was held in 1989, the coup's sapphire jubillee year anniversary. Most often the parades were held on Bucharest's Charles de Gaulle Square, and today's military parades, with occasional participation of armed forces from NATO countries, are held in either Constitution Square in the capital or at the Șoseaua Kiseleff near the Arch of Triumph.

Today the Romanian Armed Forces holds military parades on the following holidays:

- 1st Sunday of April, NATO Day (movable date)
- April 23, Land Forces Day
- May 9, Independence and Victory Day and Europe Day
- May 10, King's Day
- July 20, Air Force Day
- August 15, Navy Day
- October 25, Armed Forces Day and King Michael I's Birthday
- November 3, Day of the Vânători de munte
- December 1, Great Union Day
- On the occasion of passing out parades of military academies and NCO schools

Parades are also held by the Armed Forces in a number of major cities.

Together with the Armed Forces marching on these parades are the following:

- Romanian Gendarmenie
- Romanian Police
- Romanian Border Police
- All city and county police forces
- Romanian Intelligence Service
- Serviciul de Telecomunicații Speciale
- General Inspectorate of Aviation
- Protection and Guard Service
- Romanian General Inspectorate for Emergency Situations
- National Agency for Fiscal Administration

==== Russia and ex-Soviet countries ====
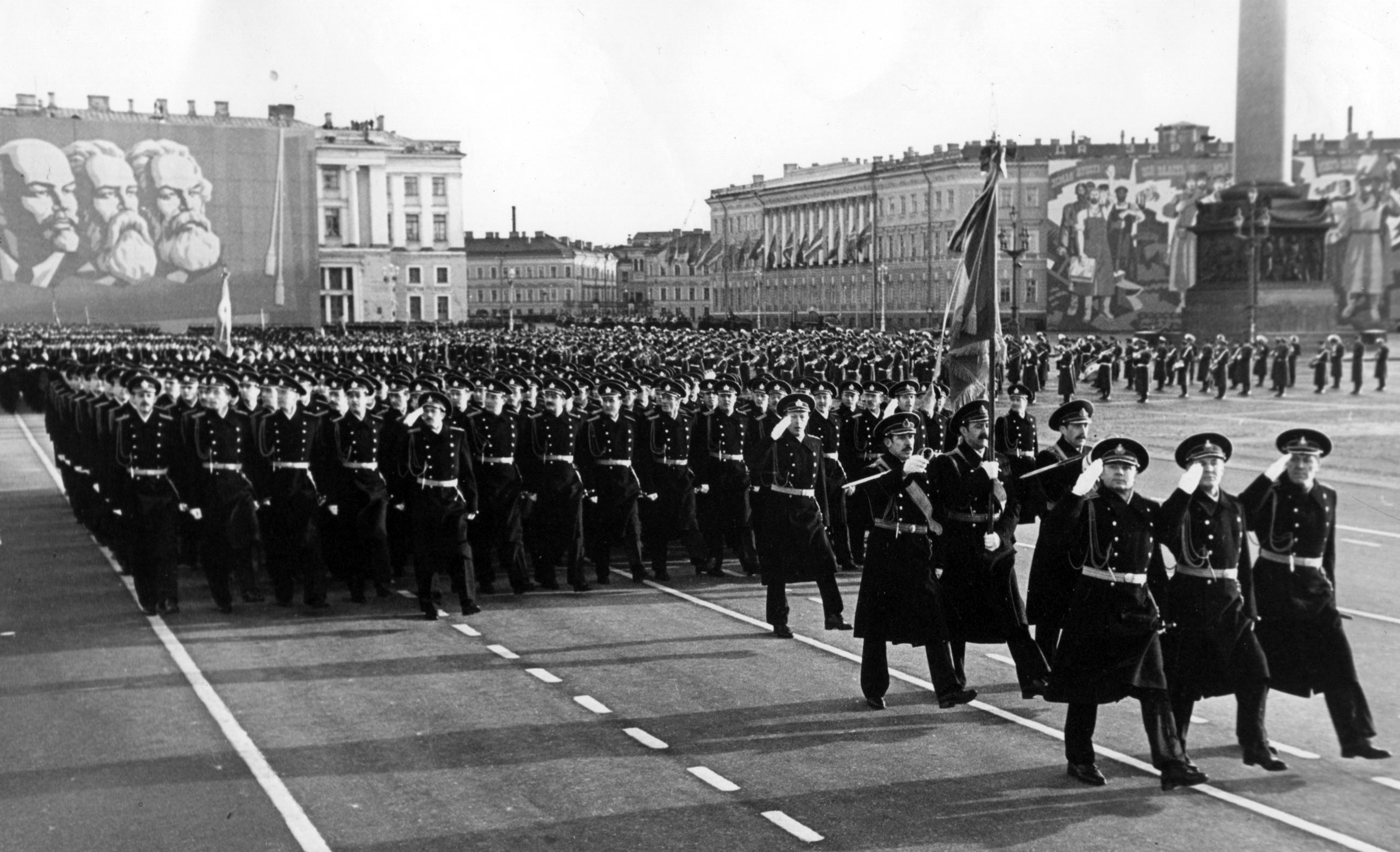
The N. G. Kuznetsov Naval Academy, led by Captain Anatoliy Karpenko, during a parade on Leningrad's Palace Square in 1983.

The Western tradition of military parades in the Russian Empire was part of the many reforms made by Peter the Great as part of his many efforts to transform the army and the navy from traditional militias to a full-blown professional armed service that is a model for the people in discipline and obedience, courage, bravery, loyalty to the country and in bringing pride and glory to her people. During the Imperial period, national parades were alternated between Moscow and Saint Petersburg on major national civil and military holidays, anniversaries of the Romanov Dynasty and as part of the imperial coronation celebrations, celebrations and parades were also held in many major cities and provincial capitals.

So important was the value of these parades that even the Soviet Armed Forces made these parades a common tradition beginning in August 1918 when the first modern parade was held in Moscow's Red Square when Moscow area Vsevobuch detachments march past, earlier than May, a military parade, the first by the nascent Red Army, was held outside the capital. Since that year, many innovations have been seen in the practice of annual parades held not just there but in the capital cities of the former Soviet Union, as well as in major cities in the wide country, which were held on 1 May (1918–1941 and 1945–1968), 7 November (1920–1941 and 1945–1990) and 9 May (1945, 1965, 1985 and 1990). The following areas in the union republics were where common parades were held in 1990:

- Ukrainian SSR – Khreshchatyk, Kyiv
- Byelorussian SSR – Lenin Square, Minsk
- Uzbek SSR – Lenin Square, Tashkent
- Kazakh SSR – Brezhnev Square, Almaty
- Georgian SSR – Rustaveli Avenue, Tbilisi
- Azerbaijan SSR – Lenin Square, Baku
- Lithuanian SSR – Gediminas Avenue, Vilnius
- Moldavian SSR – Victory Square/Great National Assembly, Kishinev
- Latvian SSR – 11 November Embankment, Riga
- Kirghiz SSR – Lenin Square, Frunze
- Tajik SSR – Lenin Square, Dushanbe
- Armenian SSR – Republic Square, Yerevan
- Turkmen SSR – Freedom Avenue, Ashgabat
- Estonian SSR – Freedom Square, Tallinn

Today, the Russian Armed Forces – and by extension countries of the former Soviet Union – host a variety of military parades held on important national holidays, honoring the men and women of their armed forces and military veterans. The celebrations in each of these countries carry on years of tradition, honor, discipline, and prestige by the millions of men and women who serve and have served in the ranks of the armed forces of their respective home countries. These parades have extensive government funding and aside from the iconic wide march past columns and occasional historical formations, typically include a mobile column, and occasionally a naval fleet review and/or air force fly past segment, a legacy of the Soviet era. Alongside the armed forces and occasionally youth cadets of military high schools, law enforcement and emergency services also take part in the parades in their countries.

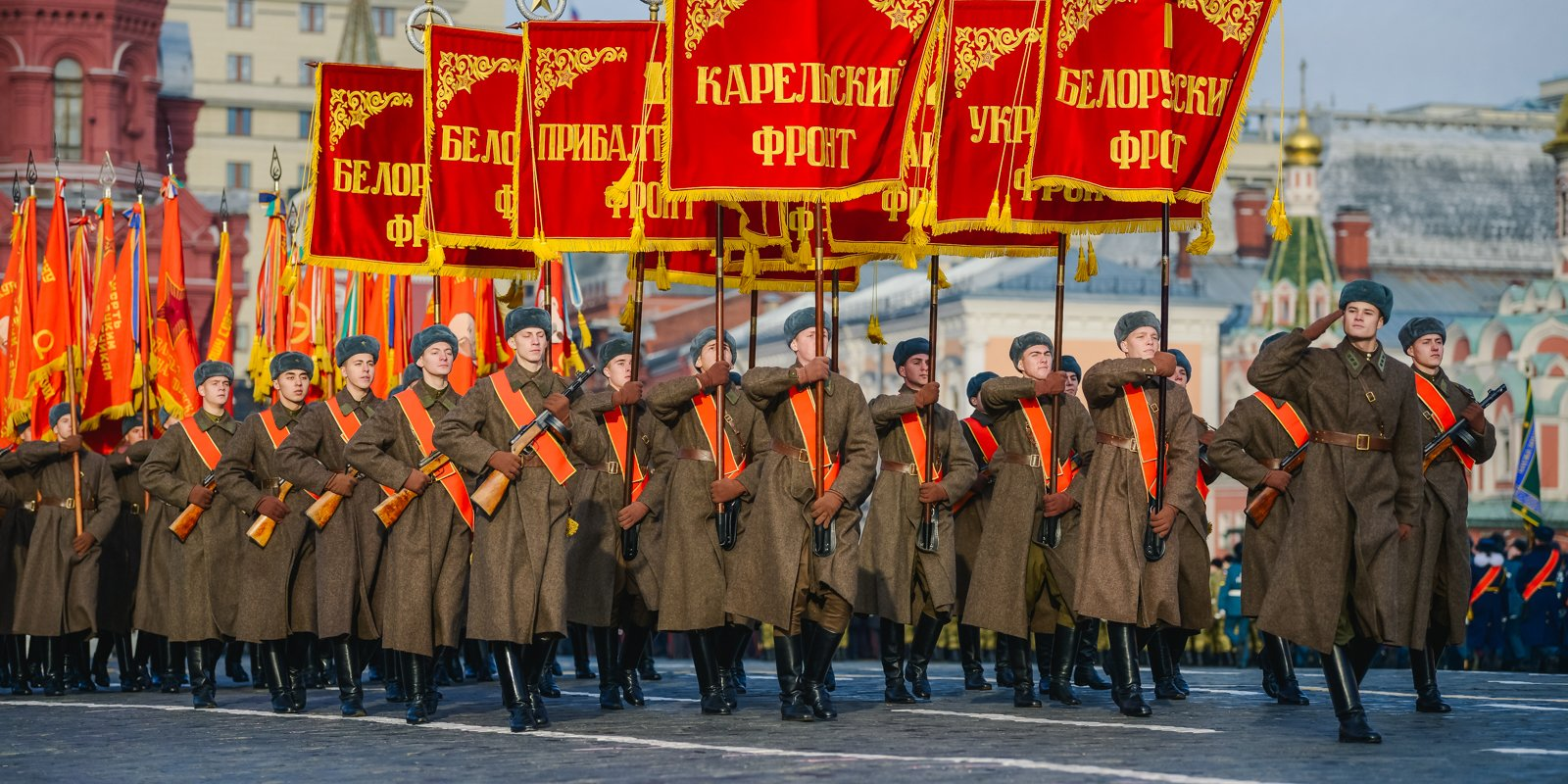
A Russian Armed Forces Honour Parade on Red Square in November 2018.

===== Armenia =====
While the country was a Soviet Republic from 1920 to 1991, Armenia was formerly independent from 1918 to 1920 and thus had armed forces composed of both veterans of the Imperial Army and guerillas fighting the Ottoman armed forces who had been enforcing the anti-Armenian massacres of 1914. Armenians fought bravery in the Eastern Front of the Second World War as part of the Soviet Armed Forces, retaining some of its traditions today. The last of the Soviet-era parades took place in 1988. Today, the Armed Forces of Armenia hosts massive parades held in Yerevan, the capital city, on the following days:

- May 28 – Republic Day
- September 21 – Independence Day

In recent years, national military parades have included drill units and military bands performing exhibition drill for the guests before the parade concludes.

Armenian military parades have garnered notable controversy. The 1996 parade coincided with the presidential election, which would take place the day after, which resulted in many opposition figures charging President Levon Ter-Petrosyan, who was in attendance, with putting on a show of force to his opposition and particularly supporters of his opponent Vazgen Manukyan. Another controversial aspect was censorship, an example of this being in 1994, when Ruben Satyan (editor-in-chief of the Russian language newspaper Vremya) reported that one Armenian general was wearing non-regulation trousers with sewn red stripes on pants intended for a private, a report which resulted in Satyan being summoned to the local military prosecutor's office, who warned him to never do a report like this again, particularly saying that "It's good you're not 45, otherwise, I'd have you sent to fight in Karabakh".

===== Azerbaijan =====
The semi-annual parade on the Day of the Armed Forces of Azerbaijan, 26 June, is one of the biggest in the Commonwealth of Independent States, held every 3 to 5 years at the Azadliq Square, Baku, honoring the many Azerbaijanis who served faithful under the colours as part of her armed forces. The forces on parade are assembled based on a mix of the Turkish and Russian parade formation.

A special victory parade was held on that same square on 10 December 2020 to mark the Azeri victory in the 2020 Nagorno-Karabakh war.

Alongside the semi-annual parades, celebration marches and occasional parades are held on the following:

- 9 May, Victory in Europe Day
- 28 May, Independence Day
- 15 September, anniversary of the Azerbaijani-Turkish victory in the 1918 Battle of Baku
- 18 October, Independence Restoration Day
- 8–9 November, Victory Day in the Nagorno-Karabakh Patriotic War and Flag Day
- Passing out parades and ceremonies of military educational institutions

===== Belarus =====
The first venue for the parades in the capital was Cathedral Square. Military parades and solemn processions took place here even before the October Revolution. Upon the Liberation of Minsk in 1944, a parade now known as the Partisans Parade was held. Military parades in the Byelorussian Soviet Socialist Republic took place on October Square from 1946 to 1984.

The Armed Forces of Belarus holds an annual military parade on 3 July along the Victors Avenue in the national capital Minsk, marking the anniversary of the liberation of the country during the 1944 Minsk Offensive, which coincides with the country's Independence Day. On special years of the victory in Europe, commemorative extraordinary parades are held there on 9 May to honor the millions of Belarusian military dead of the Second World War. Military parades in the country are based on the Russian/Polish model and tradition. Formerly, parades in the Republic of Belarus and the BSSR took place on Independence Square (known in the Soviet era as Lenin Square). This changed in the early 2000s when the square was renovated and became incompatible with the parade format. Since 2004, military parades in the capital have taken place on Victors Avenue.

The first military parade in the Western city of Grodno was held 2015 on Lenin Square. In connection with the centennial of the Belarusian Armed Forces in 2018, a military parade was also held in Grodno.

===== Georgia =====
The Defense Forces of Georgia, successor to the armed services of the Democratic Republic and Soviet formations stationed in the Georgian SSR, hosts military parades on May 26, Independence Day, the anniversary of the formation of the republic in 1918, together with elements from the National Police, the Border Police and the Georgian Coast Guard. The first parade was held on Independence Day in 1991, with 10,000 soldiers of the National Guard of Georgia taking their oath of service in front of President Zviad Gamsakhurdia at Boris Paichadze Stadium. The parade was held without heavy equipment (by order of parade commander, Colonel Avtandil Tskitishvili), with only a small detachment of cavalry being brought to the stadium. Another parade was organized in 1993. From 1997 to 2004, no military parades had been organized by the government, citing financial difficulties. In 2004, President Mikheil Saakashvili restored the tradition of holding military parades. National independence parades have also been held in the cities of Batumi and Kutaisi.

Modern parades are a mix of the former Soviet and modern Western (British, US, Turkish and Israeli) traditions and drill owing to the modernization of the defense and public security forces to NATO and EU standards.

===== Kazakhstan =====
The Armed Forces of Kazakhstan holds military parades (Kazakh: Әскери парад) that resemble the parades of the Russian military in Moscow, with one of the only exceptions being the inspection of the troops by the Supreme Commander of the Kazakh Armed Forces, instead of the defense minister. It has never held yearly parades celebrating one occasion, with parades currently being held in honor of the Defender of the Fatherland Day holiday, the first of which being 2014 and the largest parade in existence being held on this date in 2015. In the past, large scale military parades in the former capital of Almaty and the current capital of Astana were held on the following holidays:

- Kazakhstan Independence Day (1996)
- Victory Day (9 May) (1995, 2000, 2005, 2015, 2025)
- Constitution Day (Kazakhstan) (2009, 2010, 2011)

In recent years, the Defender of the Fatherland Day parade was expanded to function as a so-called "Battle Parade" (Боевой парад). So far, only two of these kinds of parades have been held; in 2013 and 2018. In contrast to usual military parades, the battle parade includes tactical exercises and military demonstrations after the parade itself. These parades usually are held at the 40th Otar Military Base in the Korday District and take place with the troops in full combat gear rather than a ceremonial full dress uniform. Like former Soviet republics, Kazakh military parades are led by a cadet drum corps, specifically from the Astana Zhas Ulan Republican School.

As of 2020, the MC for parade ceremonies is Azamat Kanapiya, who announces the parade live and not pre-recorded like his Russian counterparts.

===== Kyrgyzstan =====
Kyrgyz military parades are based on Russian traditions, having been held on many occasions in the history of the Armed Forces of Kyrgyzstan. Currently, the only consistent military parade is held on Ala-Too Square in Bishkek every 5 years in honor of the country's Independence Day. Other military parades have been held celebrating different occasions. On 24 March 2006, a parade was held on the same square celebrating the 1 year anniversary since the Tulip Revolution which overthrew President Askar Akayev. In May of that same year, a Day of the Armed Forces parade on the same square, later being deemed as "irresponsible" by opposition lawmaker Omurbek Tekebaev due to the fact that it coincided with opposition protests against President Kurmanbek Bakiyev, which itself was described by Defence Minister Ismail Isakov as purely "coincidental". In 2015, a Victory Day Parade was held in the Kyrgyz capital, being presided by Prime Minister Temir Sariyev and Chief of General Staff Asanbek Alymkozhoev in place of President Almazbek Atambayev, who was attending the 2015 Moscow Victory Day Parade that same day. The parade saw the appearance of veterans of the war in the mobile column as well as Russian troops from the local Kant Air Base taking part in the parade.

===== Latvia =====
Latvia, like its neighbors to the north and south, was also formerly independent from 1918 to 1940 and as a component republic of the Soviet Union from that year to 1941 and yet again from 1944 to 1991, and its armed forces, then as in the 90s, were formed up of Latvian born personnel who served in the Russian military and thus share some of the Russian drill and parade ceremonial in combination with Western practices. After the restoration of Latvia's independence, parades at the Freedom Monument began on 23 August 1992. Today, the Latvian National Armed Forces hosts massive parades (with occasional participation by service personnel of NATO armed forces) on the following dates:

- May 4, Restoration of Independence Day
- November 11, Lāčplēsis Day
- November 18, Proclamation Day of the Republic of Latvia

===== Lithuania =====
The first official military parade in Lithuania took place on 11 May 1919 in Kaunas. In the latter years of Soviet rule, military parades were met with much hostility. In 1989, protesters in Vilnius blocked tanks rolling on the central avenue and a year later, Chairman of the Supreme Council Vytautas Landsbergis and Prime Minister Kazimira Prunskienė both condemned the holding of a Soviet parade as "psychological warfare" and an attempt by the Soviet authorities to "intimidate" then breakaway republic.

An annual parade is held on Lithuanian Armed Forces Day (celebrated on 23 November). The holiday is traditionally celebrated with a noon parade reviewed by the president of Lithuania on Cathedral Square in Vilnius, which runs through Gediminas Avenue to Independence Square. NATO, alongside Lithuanian troops take part in the parade. In recent years large parades were held on the 95th anniversary and centennial (in 2013 and 2018) of the restoration of the Lithuanian military. Another large parade was held in 2004 on the occasion of the nation joining NATO.

===== Russia =====
Military parades in Russia were first held in 1702 as a troop review, but later grew into a ceremonial event held by order of the president of the Russian Federation in his constitutional duty as supreme commander of the Armed Forces. Alongside personnel and veterans of the Armed Forces, marching past in these parades are cadets of military high schools and middle schools and the Young Army Cadets National Movement, cadets of military faculties of civil universities and battalions of Cossacks, honoring their forebears who fought for their homeland in times past. Also, the following uniformed organizations take part in these parades:

- Kremlin Regiment of the Federal Protective Service (in Moscow only)
- National Guard of Russia
- Police of Russia
- Main Directorate for Drugs Control
- Border Service of the Federal Security Service of the Russian Federation
- Ministry of Emergency Situations
- Federal Penitentiary Service
- Investigative Committee of Russia

Today, the Moscow Victory Day Parade is the main national parade in the country, which follows the traditional format of the now defunct October Revolution Day Parades and the International Workers' Day Parade. In Russia, military parades are annually held in many parts of the country on the following days:

- Defender of the Fatherland Day on 23 February
- Victory Day on 9 May – Victory Day marks Germany's surrender to the Soviet Union in 1945 and is Russia's foremost national military holiday since 1995
- Navy Day on the last Sunday of July

Two of the most significant military parades on Moscow's Red Square were 1941 October Revolution Parade and the Victory Parade in 1945. Individual parades on the square were held on 7 March 1919 and 27 July 1920 in honor of World Congresses of the Communist International, on 7 February 1934 in honor of the 17th Congress of the All-Union Communist Party (Bolsheviks), on the very first Day of Tankmen in 1946 and one following the state funeral of Joseph Stalin in March 1953. Today, the square serves as the foremost parade venue in the nation. Rehearsals for these parades took place at Khodynka Aerodrome and Vnukovo Airfield in the Soviet era and the Alabino in the modern era.

The following Days of Military Honour often see parades held in individual cities:

- 27 January – Day of lifting of the Siege of Leningrad (held on Palace Square in Saint Petersburg)
- 2 February – Victory Day in the Battle of Stalingrad (held on Fallen Fighters Square in Volgograd)
- 23 August – Victory Day over Germany in the Battle of Kursk (held on Square of Heroes of the Battle of Kursk in Kursk)
- 2 September – Victory over Japan Day (held in the cities of the Eastern Military District such as Yuzhno-Sakhalinsk or Khabarovsk)
- 7 November – Anniversary of the historic 1941 military parades on the Red Square in Moscow and Kuybyshev Square in Samara (held every year on both squares)

===== Tajikistan =====
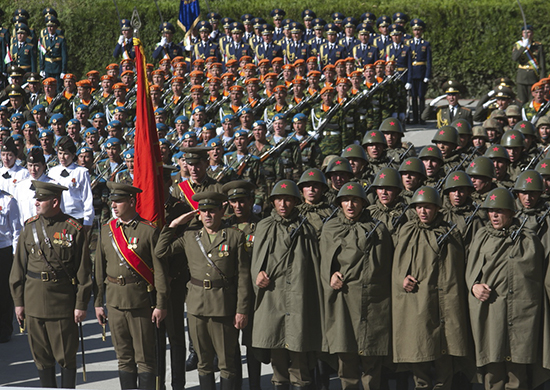
A Victory Day Parade in Victory Park, Dushanbe.

Tajik military parades are held every 2 to 3 years on Dushanbe's Dousti Square. They are either held on the occasion of Independence Day or Armed Forces Day. They usually feature the entire Dushanbe Garrison and its military equipment. The first parade in Dushanbe, which was at the time known as Stalinabad, took place on an area known as Red Square on 7 November 1945. Since then, Soviet military parades of the 201st Motor Rifle Division in the Tajikistan SSR have been held on 9 May and 7 November in Lenin Square annually until 1990. The first military parade in the Republic of Tajikistan was held on armed forces day in 1993.

Parades are also occasionally held in honor of the inaugurations of the president of Tajikistan, the last was in 2020 in honor of President Emomali Rahmon's 5th inauguration.

===== Turkmenistan =====
The principal parade hosted by the Armed Forces of Turkmenistan is held during the annual Independence Day Parade in Independence Square in Ashgabat every September 27, Independence Day, marking the day of the declaration of Turkmen independence from the Soviet Union in 1991. (From 1992 to 2017 the parade was held on October 27, the day of the independence plebiscite.) Parades have also been held on Day of Neutrality. In 2020, the 75th anniversary of the victory in World War II was celebrated with a military parade for the first time at the square in front of the Halk Hakydasy Memorial Complex.

===== Ukraine =====
Ukrainian parades involve the active and reserve men and women and veterans of the Armed Forces of Ukraine. It holds parades on the following:

- Second Sunday of July – Navy Day
- May 8 – Day of Remembrance and Victory over Nazism in World War II 1939 – 1945
- May 9 – Europe Day and anniversary of the 1920 Kyiv Polish-Ukrainian Victory Parade
- August 24 – Ukrainian Independence Day
- October 1 – Defenders of Ukraine Day
- December 6 – Armed Forces Day
- December 12 – Ground Forces Day

Something that distinguishes Ukrainian military parades from its other post-Soviet counterparts is, during the Kyiv parade, the marchpast of the tri-service Kyiv Presidential Honor Guard Battalion with the Flag of Ukraine to raise at the flagpole while honors are rendered, which includes the playing of Shche ne vmerla Ukraina. Since 2014, military bands have also played an integral part in these parades by marching with their units as part of the parade. Unlike their other counterparts, who use Hello Comrades as the official greeting during parades, Ukraine uses Glory to Ukraine as the official holiday greeting, with the troops responding by saying Glory to the Heroes.

The first major parade was held on 9 May 1995, with the participation of over 75 veterans from Ukraine and the CIS. The voice of military parades in Ukraine is Dmitry Khorkin, who since 2011 has been the official master of ceremonies for the national parades held in Kyiv's Independence Square. Khorkin's voice became remarkable for official events with the participation of the country's top officials and for supporting the Ukrainian army, which is why he had received threats from pro-Russian separatists before the 2016 military parade.

Other cities hold parades on the following days:

- Kharkiv: Day of the Belgorod-Kharkov Offensive Operation (parades held in 1993, 2003)

In addition to the Armed Forces and the Territorial Defense Forces, the following organizations also take part:

- National Guard of Ukraine
- Security Service of Ukraine
- National Police of Ukraine
- State Border Guard Service of Ukraine
- State Emergency Service of Ukraine

==== Serbia/Former Yugoslavia ====
Military parades in Serbia and the former Yugoslavia follow a close tradition that is significantly unique to the Balkan states. Their usage of the high step instead of the more European goose step is a notable display of heritage and tradition in their parades. The Yugoslav People's Army held its first military parade on Bulevar revolucije just days before the conclusion of the Second World War on International Workers' Day. Another parade on 20 October of that same year was held in honor of the one year anniversary of the end of the Belgrade Offensive.

Since then military parades in the SFRY were held on the following dates and occasions:

- 1 May 1946
- 19 October 1946
- 1 May 1947
- 1 May 1948
- 1 May 1949
- 1 May 1950
- 1 May 1951
- 1 May 1952
- 1 May 1953
- 1 May 1954
- 1 May 1955
- 1 May 1956
- 1 May 1957
- 1 May 1960
- 1 May 1961
- 1 May 1962
- 1 May 1963
- 1 May 1964
- 9 May 1965
- 9 May 1970
- 9 May 1975 – It was the first parade to feature the high-stepping march style, which was instituted by Marshal Josip Broz Tito to assert his independence from Soviet influence.
- 9 May 1985 – The parade (branded as Parade 85) was the last victory parade before the break up of Yugoslavia in the early 90s. It was also significant as it was the first parade that was not presided by Marshal Tito as leader of Yugoslavia.

Outside of the Serbian Armed Forces, the Army of the Republic of North Macedonia, the Armed Forces of Montenegro and Bosnia and Herzegovina still use the Serbian/Yugoslav parade format, as shown below.

===== Croatia =====
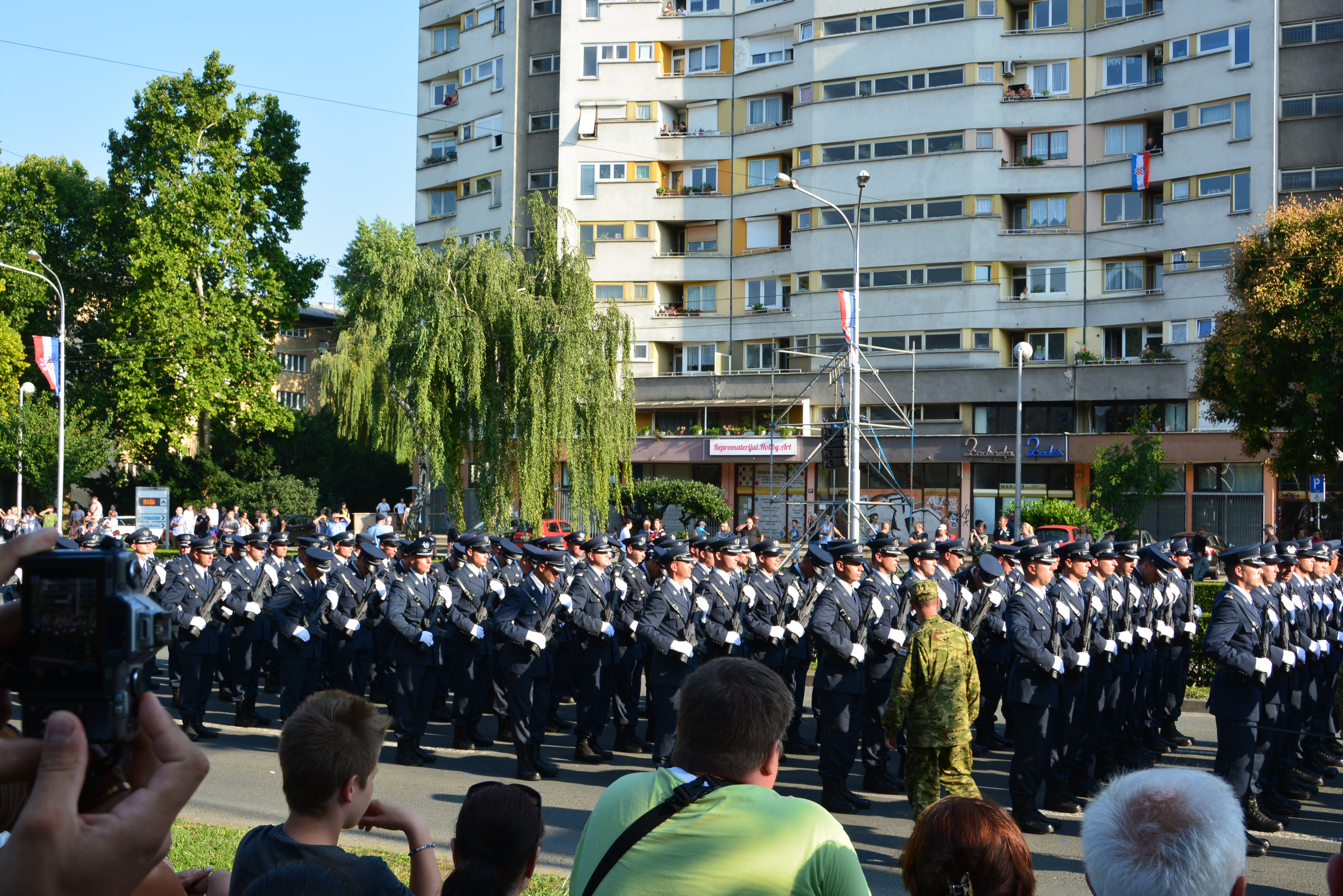
Victory Day parade in Zagreb 2015, on 20 anniversary of its victorious Operation Storm .

The first Croatian military parade took place in the neighborhood of Jarun on 30 May 1995, marking Croatian Statehood Day. Another parade was held on the same date in 1997.

A special military parade of the Armed Forces of Croatia in honor of Victory Day was held on 4 August 2015 in Zagreb, celebrating the twentieth anniversary of Operation Storm. Lijepa naša domovino (the national anthem) was notably performed by 12-year-old Mia Negovetić, accompanied by the Croatian Armed Forces Band and the Croatian Navy's vocal ensemble. The editorial board of the Zagreb-based Jutarnji list gave a positive review of the event and called for the introduction of regular parades on 4 August, whereas military analyst Igor Tabak criticized the inauthenticity of many "historical units".

===== North Macedonia =====
On Army Day in 2012, a parade at Ilinden Barracks in Skopje was held on the jubilee of the 20th anniversary of the Army of North Macedonia led by the Chief of the General Staff, Major General Gorancho Koteski.

===== Serbia =====
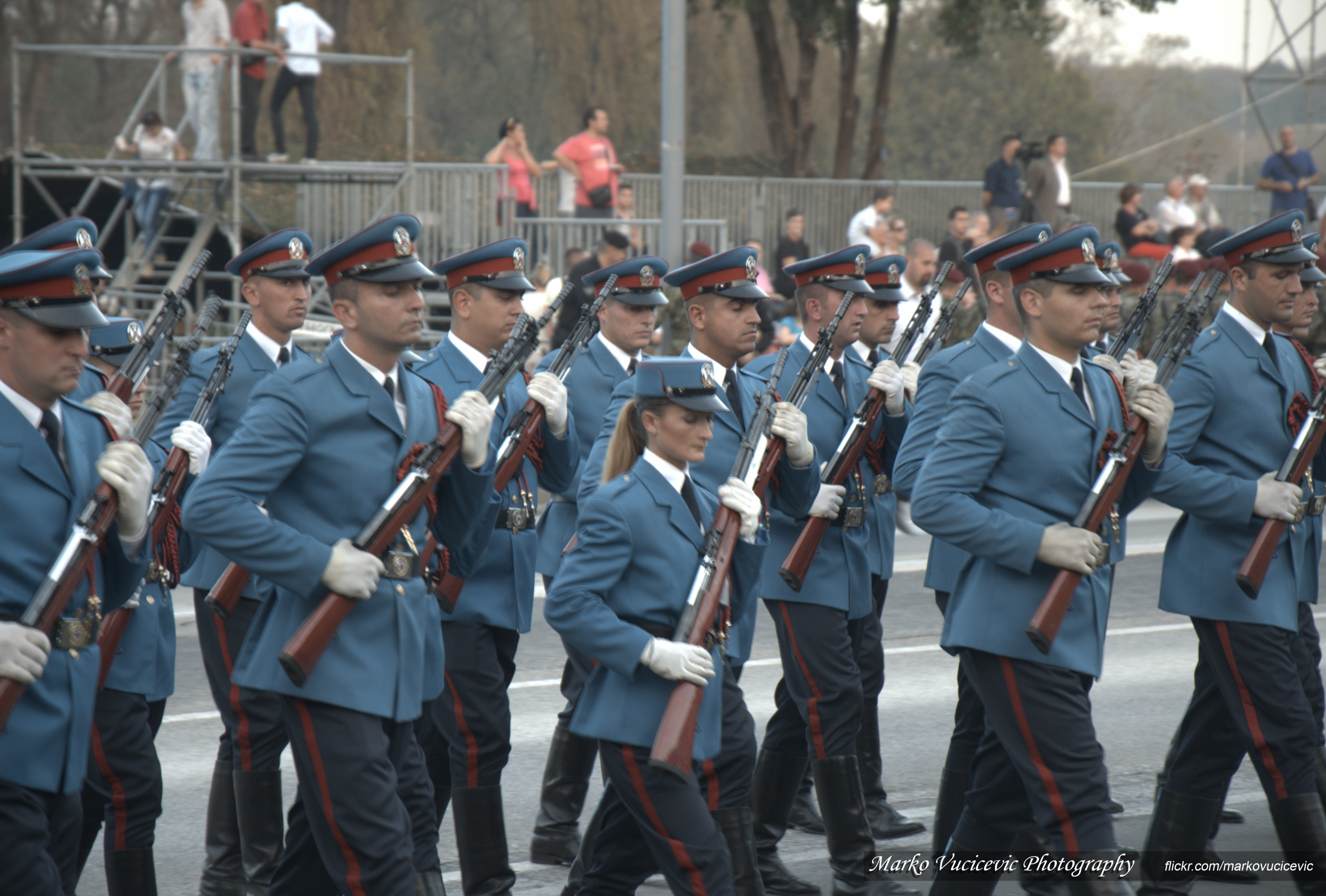
The Serbian Guards Unit during the Belgrade Military Parade.

The first massive parade in the Republic of Serbia took place on Liberation Day on 16 October 2014. Known commonly as the March of the Victor, the parade took place on Nikola Tesla Boulevard and included 4,500 Serbian Army troops, the Russian Swifts aerobatic team and even an appearance by Russian president Vladimir Putin as the guest of honour. Similar parades are still held annually. On 10 May 2019, the first Victory Day Parade in close to 35 years was held in the city of Niš. Branded as the "Defence of Freedom" show, the parade also included personnel of the Police of Serbia, which also marked the 20th anniversary of the Yugoslav resistance to the NATO bombing of Yugoslavia.

==== Singapore ====
The tiny city-state of Singapore has had a tradition of parades since the late 19th century thanks to the British presence as a colony of the Strait Settlements. The traditions of British Armed Forces formations in the island, which remained for more than a century till the last units left in the 1970s, have inspired the parade and ceremonial traditions and drill of the paramount uniformed organizations of the nation, the Singapore Armed Forces (established 1958) and the Singapore Police Force (established 1820). Until the 1960s, the King's/Queen's Birthday was marked by parades by the British Army, Royal Navy and Royal Air Force, as well as parades by the Australian and New Zealand Defence Forces. A special victory parade was held in late September 1945 to mark the victory over Japan and the conclusion of the Second World War. In those years, the Singapore Volunteer Corps, raised 1854, served as the local force representing the island in such events, a role it played for more than a century until the mid-1960s.

The first ever modern parade was held on 3 December 1959 to mark the inauguration of Singapore's second governor and first president Yusof Ishak, with the 1st battalion of the young Singapore Infantry Regiment in attendance at the historic city Padang in front of historic National Gallery Singapore complex, then City Hall, alongside the SPF, the then Singapore Fire Brigade (now the Singapore Civil Defence Force), representatives of the British Armed Forces and the cadet organizations, as well as students from secondary and primary schools. The 1959 Inauguration Parade would set a precedent that would be seen in future parades held in the country, later inflused with elements from within Southeast Asia and abroad, as well as the already dominant Commonwealth tradition and the Padang would be seen as the place of big parades in the nation. Beginning 1960, parades were held on a set date nearest 3 June to mark National Day, at first in honor of the country's grant of self-governance as an independent Commonwealth realm in 1958–59. It all ended in 1963 with the merger with Malaysia and the first Malaysia Day Parades were held at the Padang on 15–16 September 1963 to mark accession as a Malaysian state, and parades were held until 1964 on that day, 31 August and on 12 August, the governor's birthday. Late in 1963 an extraordinary Padang parade was held to mark the visit to the state of the then king of Malaysia, Putra of Perlis, which saw the participation of the 6th Battalion, Royal Malay Regiment.

On 9 August 1966 the inaugural Singapore National Day Parade was held at the Padang with President Ishak as guest of honor and principal guest, with the parade now using Malay language drill, a tradition inherited from the Malaysian Armed Forces, which replaced the English drill commands in 1963. 9 August was chosen to mark the date of the historic 1965 Proclamation of Singapore. Since then the civil-military parade and the post-parade cultural, musical and gymnastic presentations following it have been synonymous with National Day commemorations, serving thus as the nation's principal national parade, at times one of the largest in all of Southeast Asia with occasional military mobile, sea and air columns. Today the Padang hosts the NDP every 5 years as a show of gratitude to that National Monument's place in the country's history, at other years the National Stadium and The Float @ Marina Bay (soon NS Square) have at times alternated as the venues of the parade. In 1975, 1977, 1979, 1981 and 1983 the parade was a localized event held in several sports stadiums. In 2019 the NDP was held at the Padang in a break from tradition to honor the Singapore Biccentenial. A televised event produced by Mediacorp, it is also live streamed globally to millions online and features, together with the SAF, SPF and SCDF, the following organizations:

- Immigration and Checkpoints Authority
- Singapore Customs
- National Cadet Corps
- National Police Cadet Corps
- National Civil Defence Corps
- Singapore Scout Association
- Girl Guides
- Red Cross Youth
- St. John's Ambulance Brigade
- Boys Brigade Singapore
- Girls Brigade Singapore
- SAFRA National Service Association
- Singaporean higher educational institutions
- Singaporean secondary schools
- People's Action Party and PAP Community Foundation
- National Trades Union Congress
- Contingents of government ministries
- Contingents of national statuory boards and state owned corporations
- Contingents of public and private NGOs
- Contingents of private local and foreign corporations
- Singapore National Olympic Council and Sport Singapore

Parades are also held in the following occasions:

- 15 February, Total Defence Day
- 8 May, NPCC Day
- 24 May, Police Day
- 1 July, SAF Day
- 11 November, Remembrance Day
- On the occasion of the inaugurations of the president of Singapore
- On the occasion of passing out parades of the Basic Military Training Centre, Specialist Cadet School and Officer Cadet School
- Service and branch anniversaries

==== South Africa ====
The tradition of military parades in South Africa traces its origin to the Netherlands, thru the Dutch East India Company, and later on the United Kingdom. The combination of traditions from these two countries created a unique South African tradition that would be manifested in the public parades of today's South African National Defence Force, created 1912 on the basis of the former separate regional armed forces of the country and has been in its current form since 1994, infusing traditions from the armed forces of the former Bantustans and the guerrilla forces of some of the political parties involved in South Africa until the 1990s.

Today, the parade held on Armed Forces Day held every 21 February serves as the principal military parade of the SANDF. It is a double anniversary of both the 1917 sinking of SS Mendi during the First World War, which became the country's biggest military tragedy in history, and the 1994 reformation of the South Africa Defence Force into the current day SANDF. The national parade is held yearly in a set host city, with the service branches organizing celebrations yearly with a specific branch being tasked for the organization of the national celebrations, with responsibilities being changed year after year. Taking the salute is the president of South Africa, who is commander in chief of the Forces.

==== Turkey ====
The Turkish tradition of military parades was introduced in the 19th century as part of the Westernization and modernization of the army and navy of the then Ottoman Empire to modern standards of warfare and military ceremonial, a tradition carried on by the modern Turkish Armed Forces, whose parade drill includes high stepping, a tradition introduced in the 1900s.

Today parades held by the Turkish Armed Forces and its veterans are held in the following days:

- April 23 – National Sovereignty and Children's Day
- May 19 – Commemoration of Atatürk, Youth and Sports Day
- August 30 – Victory Day, also principal holiday of the Armed Forces
- October 29 – Republic Day

The August 30 parade is the country's principal parade, and features vehicle and aviation elements, many of them nationally produced, in addition to the usual marchpast.

==== United Kingdom ====
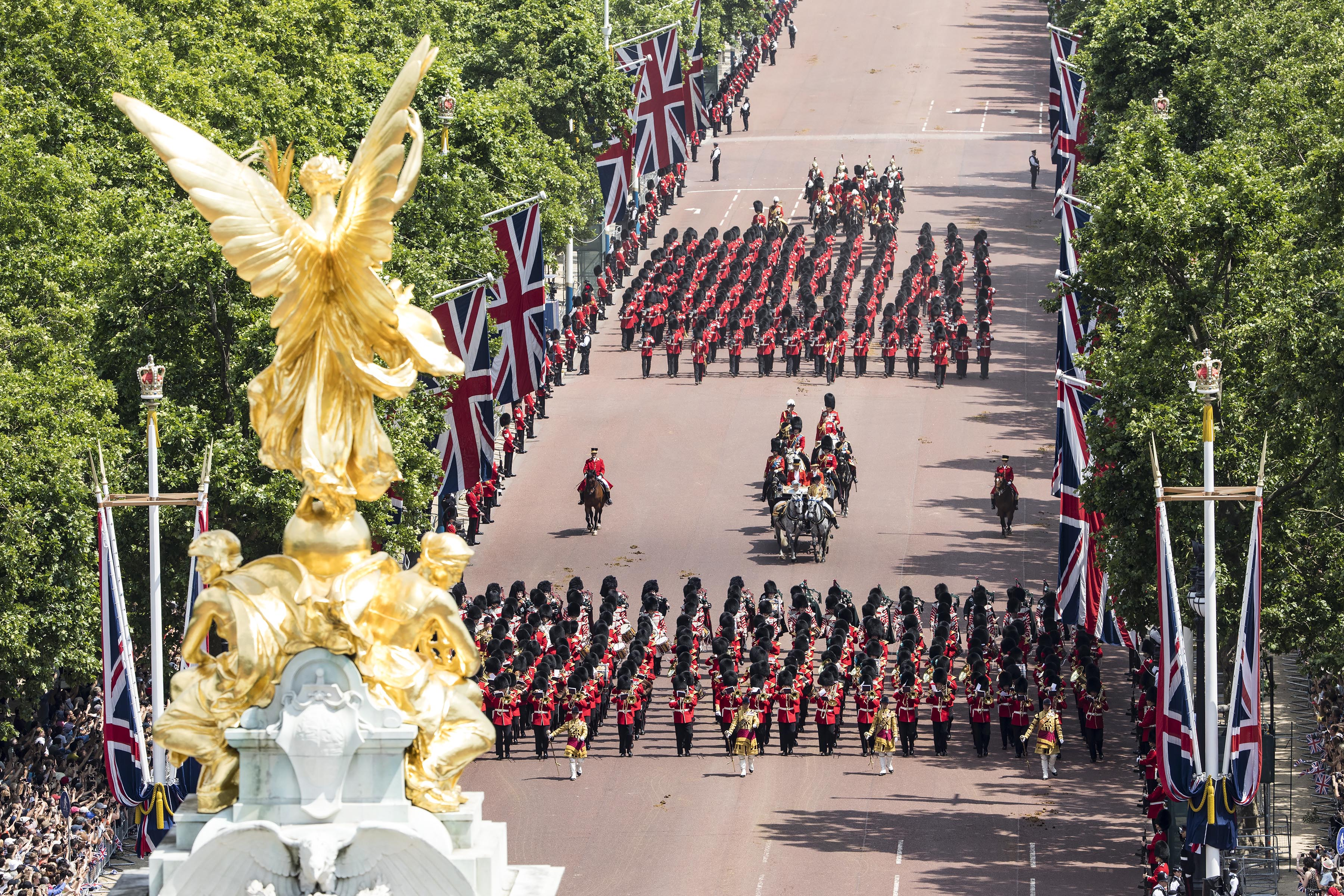
The troops of the Household Division during the 2017 Trooping the Colour

In the United Kingdom, a guard of honour traditionally performs the march past for whoever received the salute. In the capital of London, traditional ceremonial units that perform public duties (the King's Guard for example) take part in military parades such as the more common Trooping the Colour on Horse Guards Parade and special parades during the jubilee years of the monarch in his or her capacity as commander-in-chief of the British Armed Forces. The Household Cavalry (Blues and Royals and Life Guards) traditionally perform trot pasts in mounted formation, together with the King's Troop, Royal Horse Artillery. These units have been known to parade in slow and quick time. Personnel of the armed forces, cadet organizations, The Royal British Legion and veterans' organizations also parade during national holidays such as Remembrance Day or Armed Forces Day, and in local Freedom of the City parades. Also common are passing out parades, which are held within training establishments of the armed services. During a regimental military parade, the regimental march of the unit is played.

==== United States ====
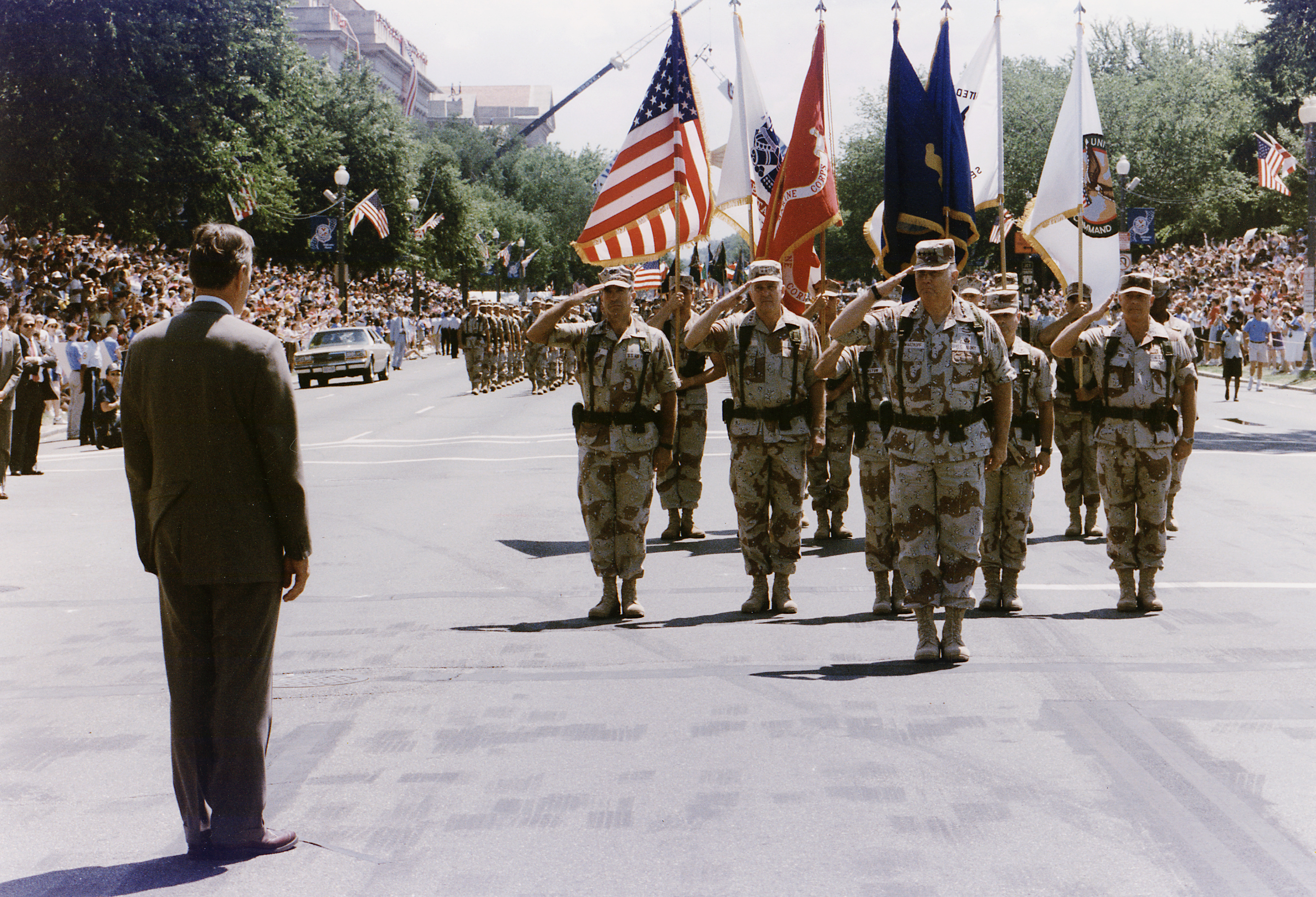
President George H. W. Bush greeting Norman Schwarzkopf Jr. on the parade route.

Military parades in the American capital are held quadrennially by servicemen of the United States Armed Forces during the presidential inaugural parade. These are not considered to be regular military parades however, as the parading formations are actually not entirely composed of armed servicemen.

The first known organized military procession in the United States was the Grand Review of the Armies, on May 23 and May 24, 1865, following the end of the American Civil War (1861–1865). The New York City Victory Parade of 1946 was held in mid-January in 1946 to commemorate the conclusion of World War II and the Allied victory over the Axis Powers in all theaters of the war, helped by the service of millions of Americans who served under the armed forces and the National Guard, in addition to the state defense forces. In the late 40s and the early 50s, massive parades in honor of Army Day and later Armed Forces Day were held in the capital. The National Victory Celebration parade was held on June 8, 1991, to celebrate the conclusion of Gulf War in Iraq. The US Army 250th Anniversary Parade was held on June 14, 2025, to celebrate the Army's 250th birthday.

In 2018, a national debate was sparked when President Donald Trump proposed to hold a military parade on 10 November 2018 in honor of the Veterans Day holiday the next day, commonly known as the "Trump Military Parade", and by August of that year, the Department of Defense announced that the military parade would be postponed until 2019. The 2019 Fourth of July parade was the first attended by the president of the United States in his capacity as the constitutional commander-in-chief of the United States Armed Forces and the National Guard Bureau, with the parade route changed to include the Lincoln Memorial complex within the greater area around the National Mall. It was also the first time since the 1950s where units aside from the guards of honor, also included cadets from the military academies, units of the Armed Forces and the National Guard and the nationally produced military equipment of the services marching past in the national capital city in front of the members of government, Congress, veterans and the people of the capital.

Annual military parades, as well as armed forces and veterans' participation in civil parades are held in the following days in major cities in the country, in areas with military installations and in state capitals:

- March 29: Vietnam Veterans Day
- 3rd Saturday of May: Armed Forces Day
- Last Monday of May: Memorial Day
- 14 June: Flag Day and Army Birthday
- 4 July – United States Independence Day
- 11 November – Veterans Day
- 4th Thursday of November – Thanksgiving Day

Parades are also held within the military academies, high schools, bases and installations of the Armed Forces, as well as by JROTC and ROTC units, the National Guard's Youth Challenge Program and youth uniformed cadet organizations (Young Marines, American Cadet Alliance, National Defense Cadet Corps and the United States Naval Sea Cadet Corps (including the Navy League Cadet Corps)) on the following days aside from the aforementioned Army Birthday:

- 4 August: Coast Guard Day (United States Coast Guard)
- 17 September: Air Force Day (United States Air Force)
- 13 October: US Navy Birthday (United States Navy)
- 27 October: Navy Day (United States Navy)
- 10 November: Marine Corps Day (United States Marine Corps)
- 13 December: National Guard Day (National Guard of the United States)
- During a change of command, retirement and recruit and cadet graduation parades within the service branches of the armed forces and all military academies and high schools
- During unitwide anniversaries and remembrance days of important battles of the Armed Forces
- During holidays marked by each of the states and federal territories and major cities as well as in Puerto Rico as can be permitted by the commander of the unit taking part
- During inauguration ceremonies of state governors and country, city and municipal chief executives

The typical presidential inaugural or holiday parade hosted in Washington, D.C., is hosted by the National Capital Region of the Department of Defense, while local and state level parades are hosted by the local military installations and local area governments.

Alongside personnel and veterans of the Armed Forces and the National Guard Bureau and all others mentioned above, all active, reserve and retired state defense forces and naval militia personnel also take part in these parades in addition with, in local areas, personnel from the following organizations:

- U.S. Customs and Border Protection (including the United States Border Patrol)
- National Park Service Law Enforcement Rangers and United States Park Police of the National Park Service
- State police departments
- Local county sheriff's departments
- Local city and municipal police departments, including cadets of police academies
- State fire and emergency services
- Local county fire and emergency services
- Local city and municipal fire and emergency services
- Veterans of the local and state law enforcement, fire and emergency services
- Boy Scouts of America
- Girl Scouts of the USA
- Medical Cadet Corps
- Other youth organizations
- Foreign armed forces veterans' organizations within the United States

==== Venezuela ====
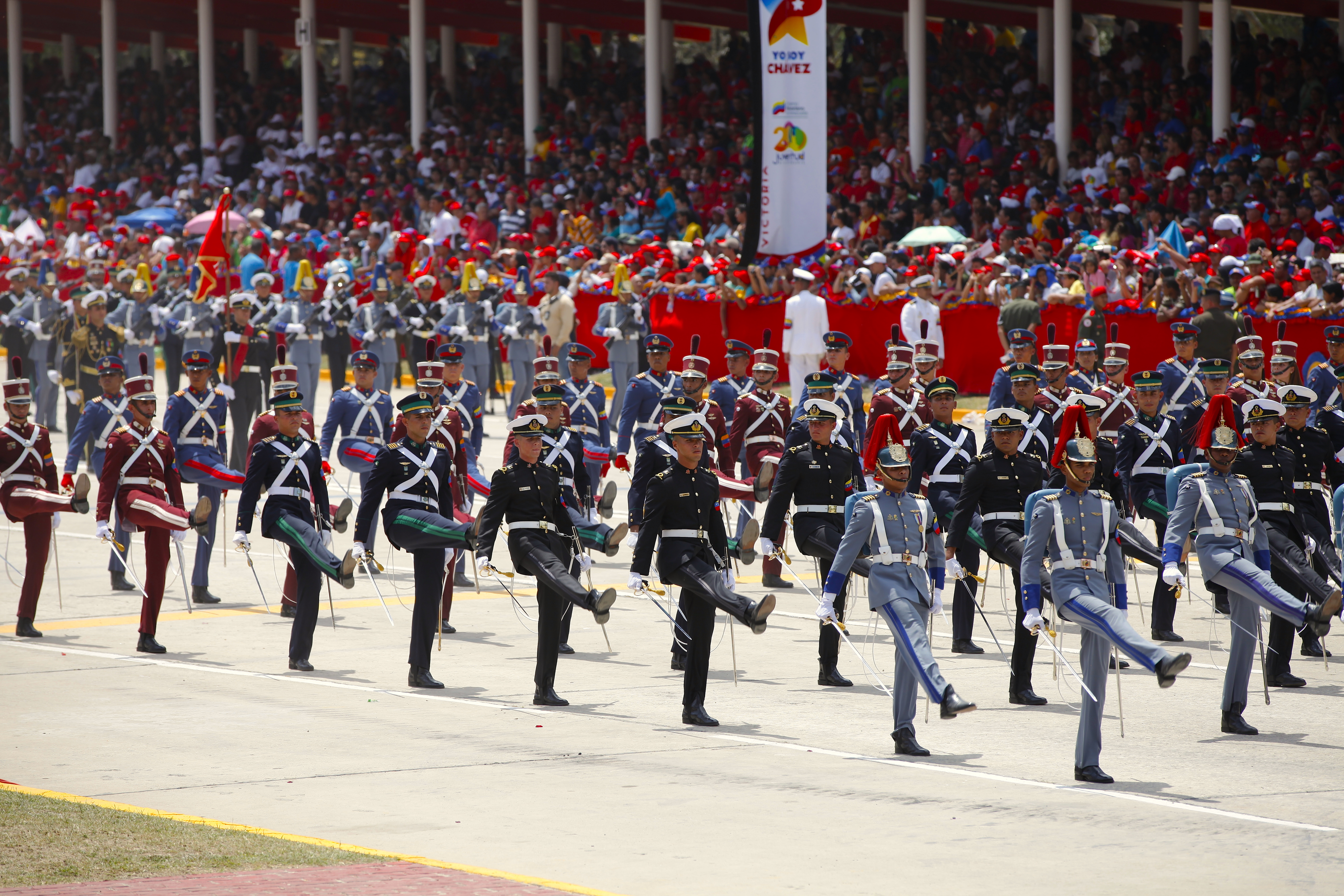
Cadets of the Bolivarian Military University of Venezuela in their unique slow march in a military parade

Full blown military parades by the National Bolivarian Armed Forces of Venezuela together with the Venezuelan National Police are held on the following days:

- 13 April, National Militia Day
- 19 April, 19 April National Day
- 24 June, Army Day
- 5 July, Independence Day
- 24 July, Navy Day (including the occasional fleet review)
- 7 August, National Guard Day
- 27 November, Air Force Day
- During change of command, retirement and recruit and cadet graduation parades within the service branches of the armed forces and all military academies and high schools
- Following the presidential inauguration ceremony every 6 years in Caracas

Taking part on these parades are active duty and reserve personnel of the NBAF and its service branches, and these are a mix of the German, British and later on Chinese and Russian traditions.

In August 2018, during a military parade and ceremony on the Venezuelan National Guard's 81st anniversary, President Nicolás Maduro was targeted in a drone attack, which left him unharmed, and left 8–9 people injured.

==== Vietnam ====
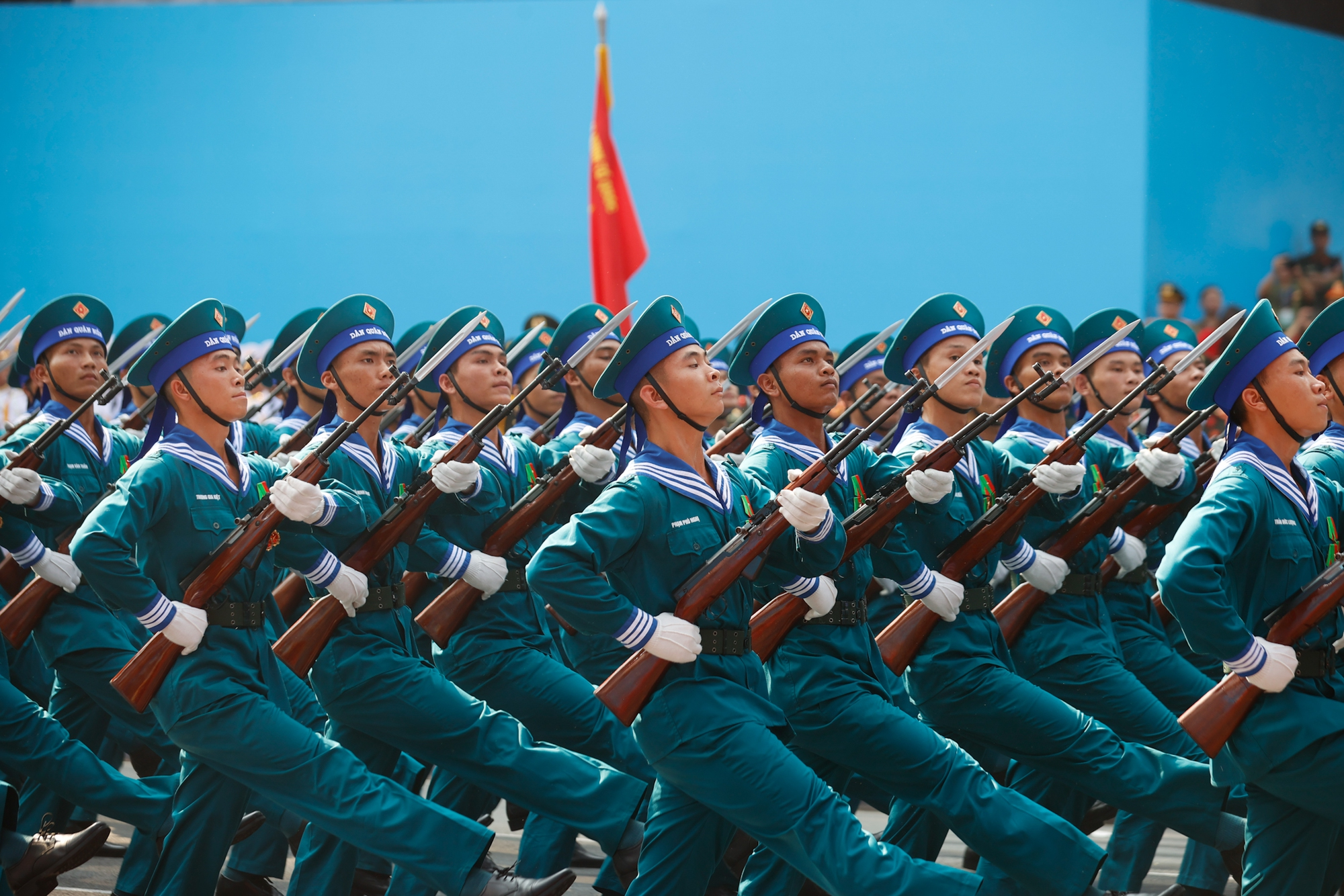
The Vietnam Militia and Self-Defence Force is marching for the Reunification Day in 2025, in Ho Chi Minh city.

As a former French territorial possession, Vietnam hosts a number of military parades with a combination of French, Russian and Chinese drill often featuring the People's Army of Vietnam and Vietnam People's Public Security on the following dates:

- April 30, Reunification Day and Conclusion of the Vietnam War Anniversary
- May 1, International Workers' Day and Air Force Day
- May 7, Victory Day in the Battle of Dien Bien Phu and Navy Day
- August 19, August Revolution Day and People's Public Security Day
- September 2, Independence Day and Victory Over Japan Day
- October 10, Capital Liberation Day
- December 22, People's Army Day

== See also ==
- At attention
- Military band
- Parade
- Drill commands
- Exhibition drill
- March (music)
- Police Day
