= 1918 White victory parade in Helsinki =

1918 military parade in Helsinki, Finland

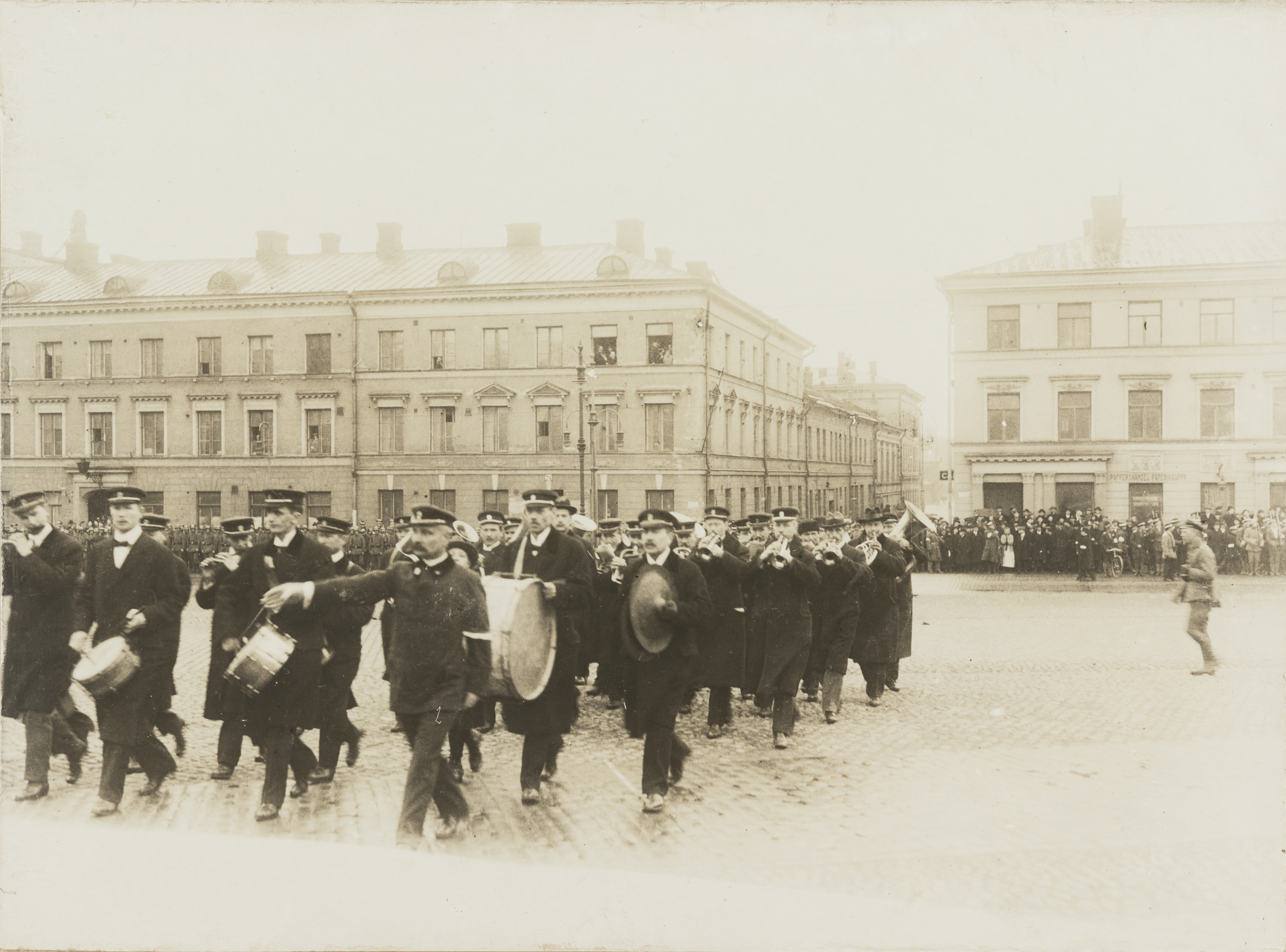
The White Guards Band during the parade.

The 1918 White victory parade in Helsinki was a military parade of the Finnish White Guard on 16 May 1918 celebrating their decisive victory in the Finnish Civil War, which officially ended the day before. The parade took place in Helsinki, the capital of Finland. The parade was presided by General Carl Gustaf Emil Mannerheim, the then Commander-in-Chief of the Finnish Defense Forces, a position he would resign from 14 days later. It consisted of 12,000 men marching down the streets of the capital. It is regarded today as a political show of force organized by Mannerheim to strengthen his position vis-à-vis the German troops in the country. The parade played an important role in Mannerheim's later career, as a result of which he became nationally known to the point of becoming the 6th President of Finland in the mid-1940s. The Whites also organized victory parades in other cities they had occupied during the war. Large parades were also held in Vaasa and Vyborg, both of which Mannerheim attended.

== Background ==
In early April, troops from the Imperial German Army took the capital, leaving the whites to control southern Finland. Mannerheim, who was opposed to the Germans, wanted to demonstrate a national Finnish Army to Helsinki's residents and in doing so, counteract the growing influence of the Germans in Finnish society and politics. Despite the intentions behind the parade, German Major General Rüdiger von der Goltz and his staff were invited to review the parade.

== Details ==
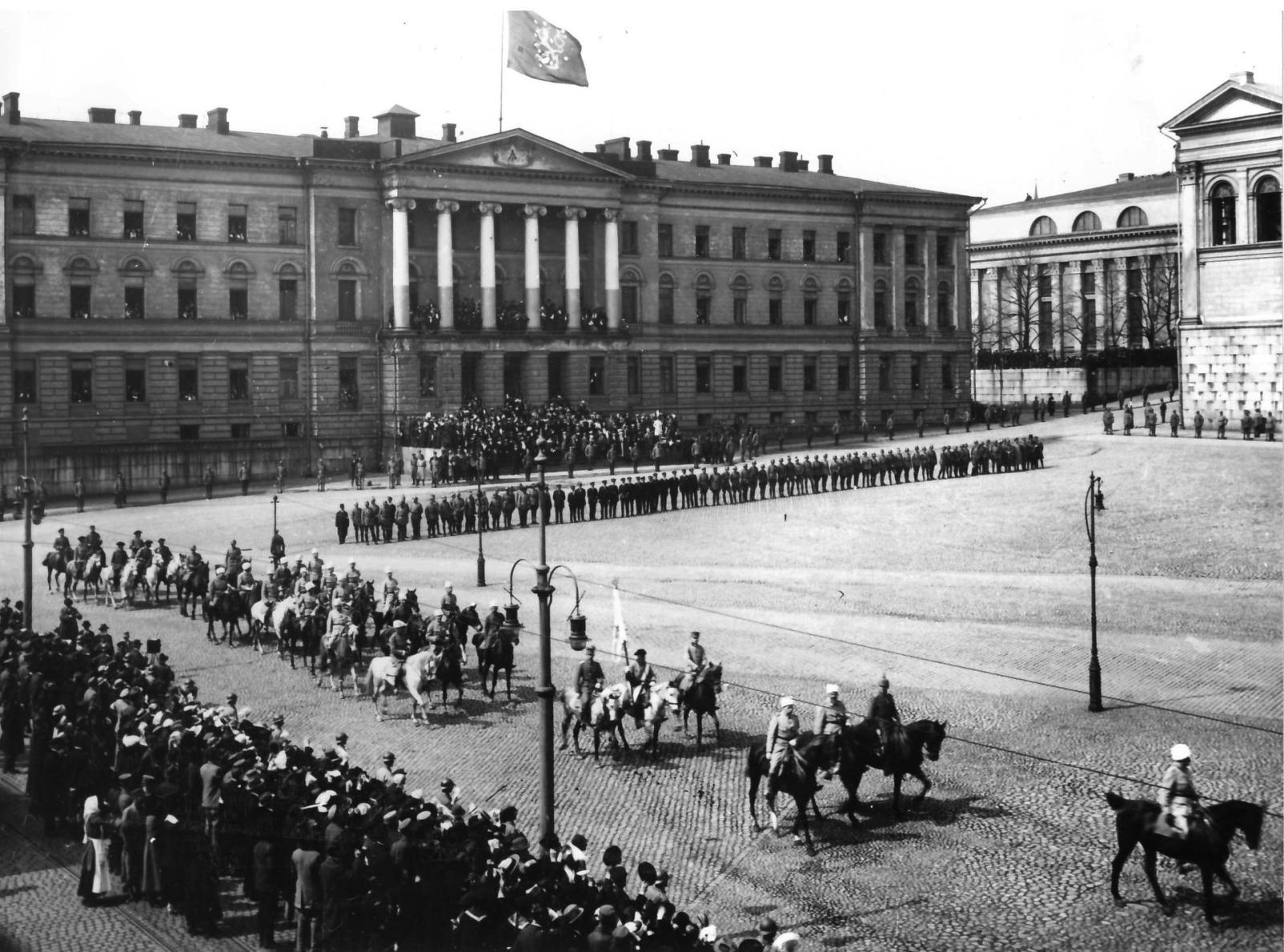
The parade procession on Senate Square in front of the University of Helsinki City Centre Campus.

The parade was divided into three parts: a march into the city, an inspection and a march-past. 12,000 men participated, accompanied by five military bands and other troop bands. Only some separate battalions/companies participated in the parade from the Eastern Army. The parade of the White Guards began from the street that is now known as Mannerheimintie, with General Mannerheim and his staff were riding in front on horseback. The others grouped into infantry units led by Commander Martin Wetzer from the Western Army, as well as the staffs of the Karelian Army Corps. They were closely followed by units such as the Uusimaa Dragoon Regiment and Jägers. Those who were present at the Battle of Tampere wore fir twigs as part of their headgear. Gösta Theslöf, the then Governor-General of Helsinki received the Commander-in-Chief in the latter half of the city while the first contingents of the parade continued along the parade route to Helsinki Senate Square. Other contingents marched to the Kauppatori. Chairman of the Senate Pehr Evind Svinhufvud and General Mannerheim inspected the troops and then delivered speeches to those attending. It was announced in one of the speeches that the troops had been given the honorary titles as well as the integration of guards units in Lapua, Vörå and Vaasa in the White Guard. After a service held in the Church of Nicholas (now the Helsinki Cathedral), Mannerheim and members of the new government inspected the parade troops near a statue of the national poet Johan Ludvig Runeberg in Pohjoisesplanadi.

== Legacy ==
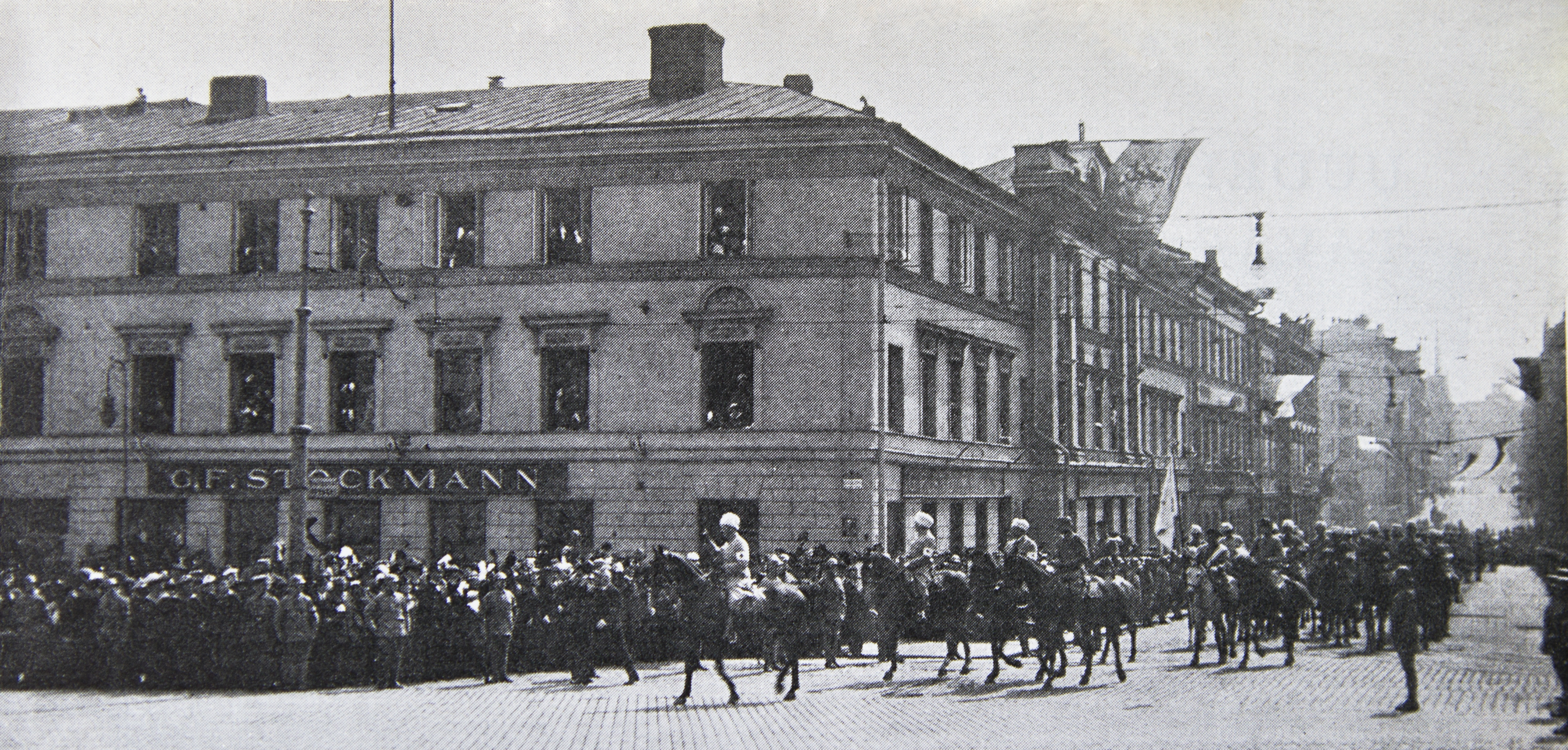
General Mannerheim marching in front of Stockmann department store. Photograph by Gunnar Lönnqvist.

The 16 May was celebrated as the Flag Day of the Finnish Defence Forces until 1942. An annual parade was organized on that day until the Second World War broke out in 1939. On his 75th birthday in 1942, Mannerheim's birthday (4 June) was declared as Flag Day by the National government, shifting the celebrations from 16 May to 4 June. This declaration was part of the celebrations that also saw the decision to grant Mannerheim the title of Marshal of Finland. Today, Flag Day continues to be an official military holiday and is celebrated with parades and award ceremonies. 16 May is informally celebrated by the population as a commemoration of the end of the war while the third Sunday in May is officially recognized as the Commemoration Day of Fallen Soldiers. This holiday sometimes falls in the same week as 16 May and on that date itself.

== See also ==
- Moscow Victory Parade of 1945
- Independence Day (Finland)
- Victory parade
- Winter War
