= Victory parade =

Parade to celebrate a military or sports victory

A victory parade is a parade held to celebrate a victory. Numerous military and sport victory parades have been held.

== Military victory parades ==
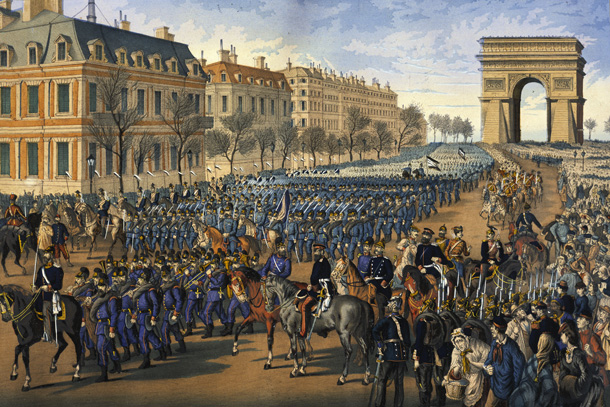
German troops parade down the Champs-Élysées in Paris after their victory in the Franco-Prussian War

Among the most famous parades are the victory parades celebrating the end of the First World War and the Second World War. However, victory parades date back to ancient Rome, where Roman triumphs celebrated a leader who was militarily victorious. In the modern age, victory parades typically take the form of celebrating a national victory, rather than a personal one. In the 21st century, politicians in nations such as Azerbaijan and Ukraine have stated their intentions to hold victory parades after the resolving of regional conflicts, in this case the Nagorno-Karabakh conflict and the War in Donbas respectively.

=== Joint-parades ===
- Berlin Victory Parade of 1945 – Soviet Union, United States, Great Britain and France
- Berlin Victory Parade of 1946 – Soviet Union, United States, Great Britain and France
- German–Soviet military parade in Brest-Litovsk – Nazi Germany and Soviet Union

=== Afghanistan ===
- 1979 First Anniversary of the Saur Coup Parade
- 1986 Battle of Khost Parade
- 1989 Battle of Jalalabad Victory Parade

=== Azerbaijan ===
- 1918 Baku Victory Parade, celebrating the victory in the Battle of Baku by Ottoman forces and forces of the Azerbaijan Democratic Republic from the Bolsheviks.
- 2020 Baku Victory Parade

=== China ===
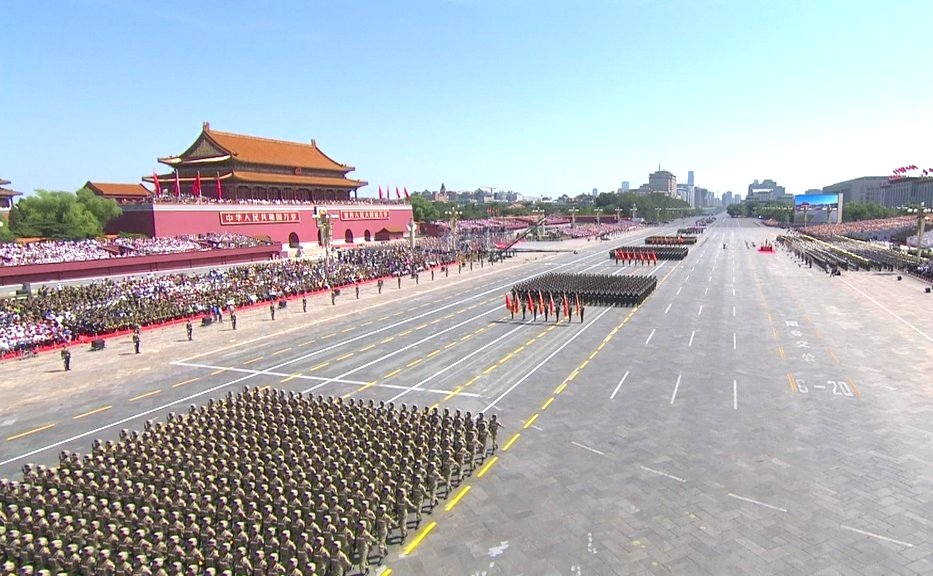
Chinese troops marching past Tiananmen at the 2015 Victory Day Parade

- 2015 China Victory Day Parade, September 3, 2015, a military parade to celebrate the 70th anniversary of Victory over Japan Day of the Second World War.
- 2025 China Victory Day Parade, September 3, 2025, a military parade to celebrate the 80th anniversary of Victory over Japan Day of the Second World War.

=== Estonia ===
- Võidupüha (June 23), celebrates the victory in the Battle of Võnnu (1919)

=== Finland ===
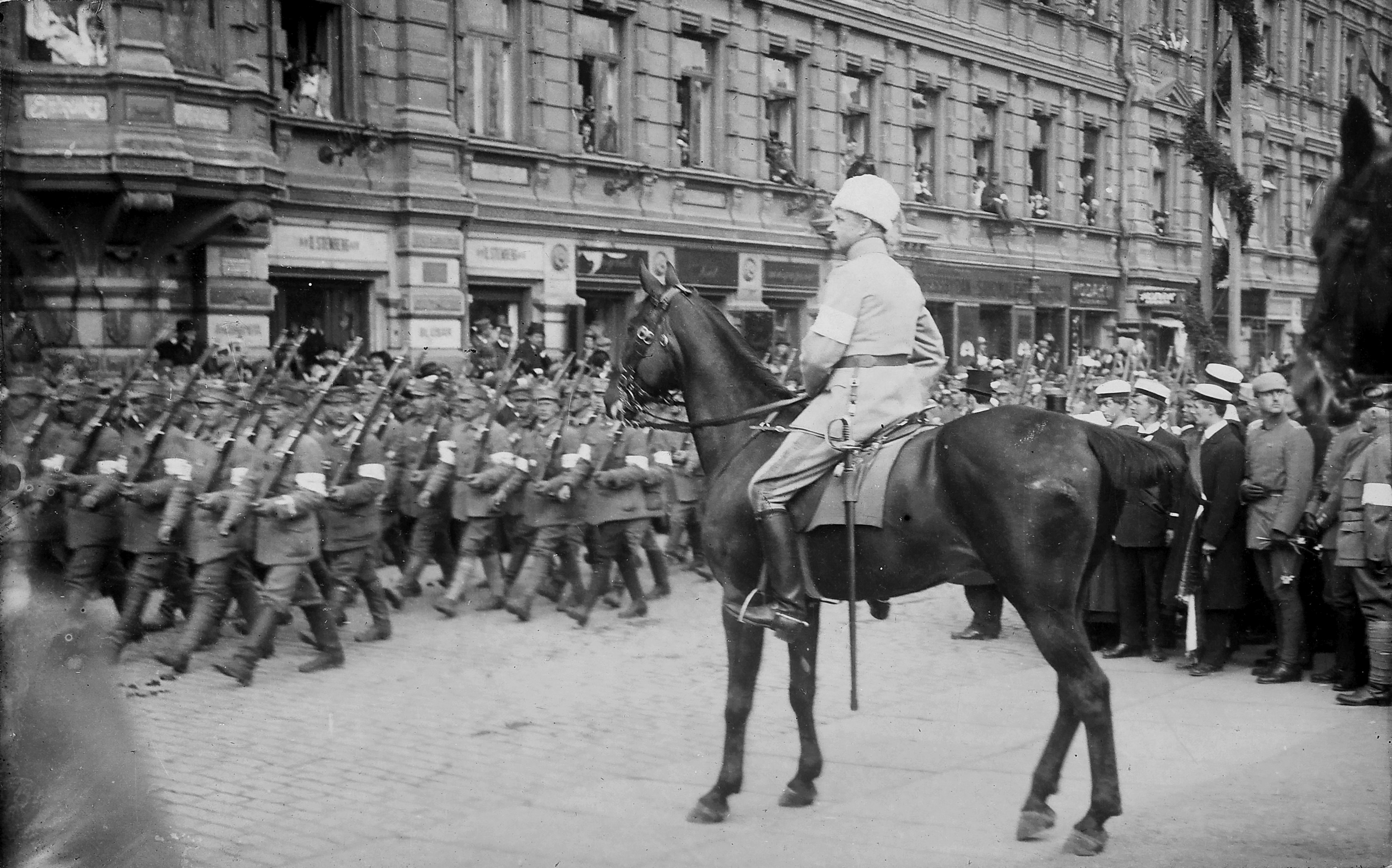
General C. G. E. Mannerheim at the White Victory Parade in 1918

- Valkoisten Voitonparaati
- 1941 Viipuri Victory Parade

=== France ===
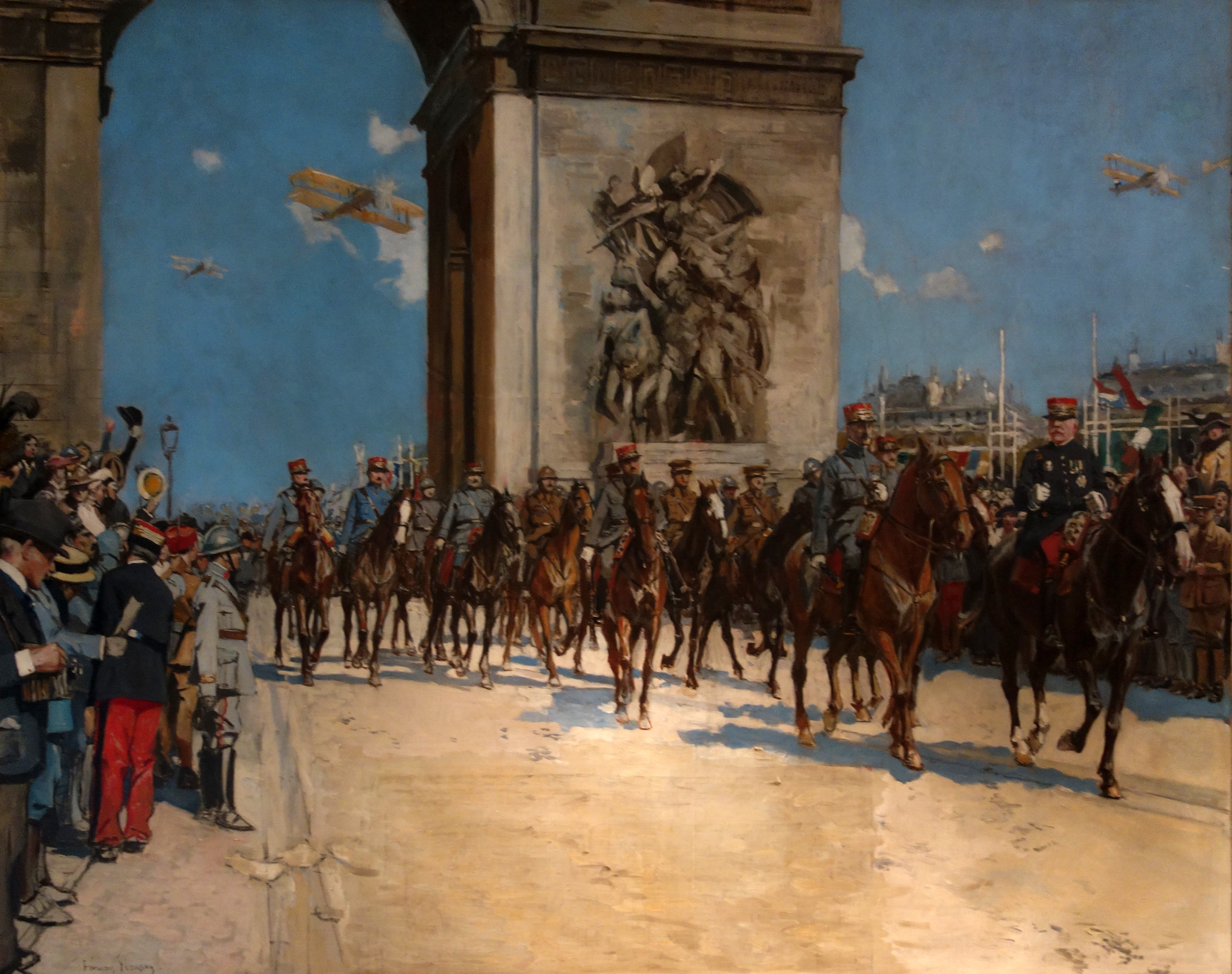
Le défilé de la Victoire, le 14 juillet 1919, by François Flameng

- 1871 Prussian parade in Paris, celebrating the Franco-Prussian War.
- 1919 Paris Victory Parade, celebrating the victory in the First World War.
- 1940 German Victory Parade in Paris. After the Fall of France, the German army marched down the Avenue Foch in triumph on 14 June 1940, following the route of the French victory over Germany parade after WWI.
- 1944 Paris Victory Parade, held on 26 August 1944.
- 1944 Dieppe Victory Parade, victory parade of the 2nd Canadian Infantry Division in Dieppe celebrated on 3 September 1944.
- 1945 Paris Victory Parade

=== Germany ===
- 1806 French Berlin Victory Parade
- 1945 British Berlin Victory Parade

=== Mongolia ===
- 80th anniversary Battle of Khalkhin Gol Victory Parade (2020)

=== Iraq ===
- Baghdad Victory Parade of 2017, celebrating the end of the War in Iraq, held in the fortified Green Zone.

=== Poland ===
- Wehrmacht victory parade in Warsaw in honor of the Invasion of Poland, 5 October 1939.

=== Russia and some CIS countries ===
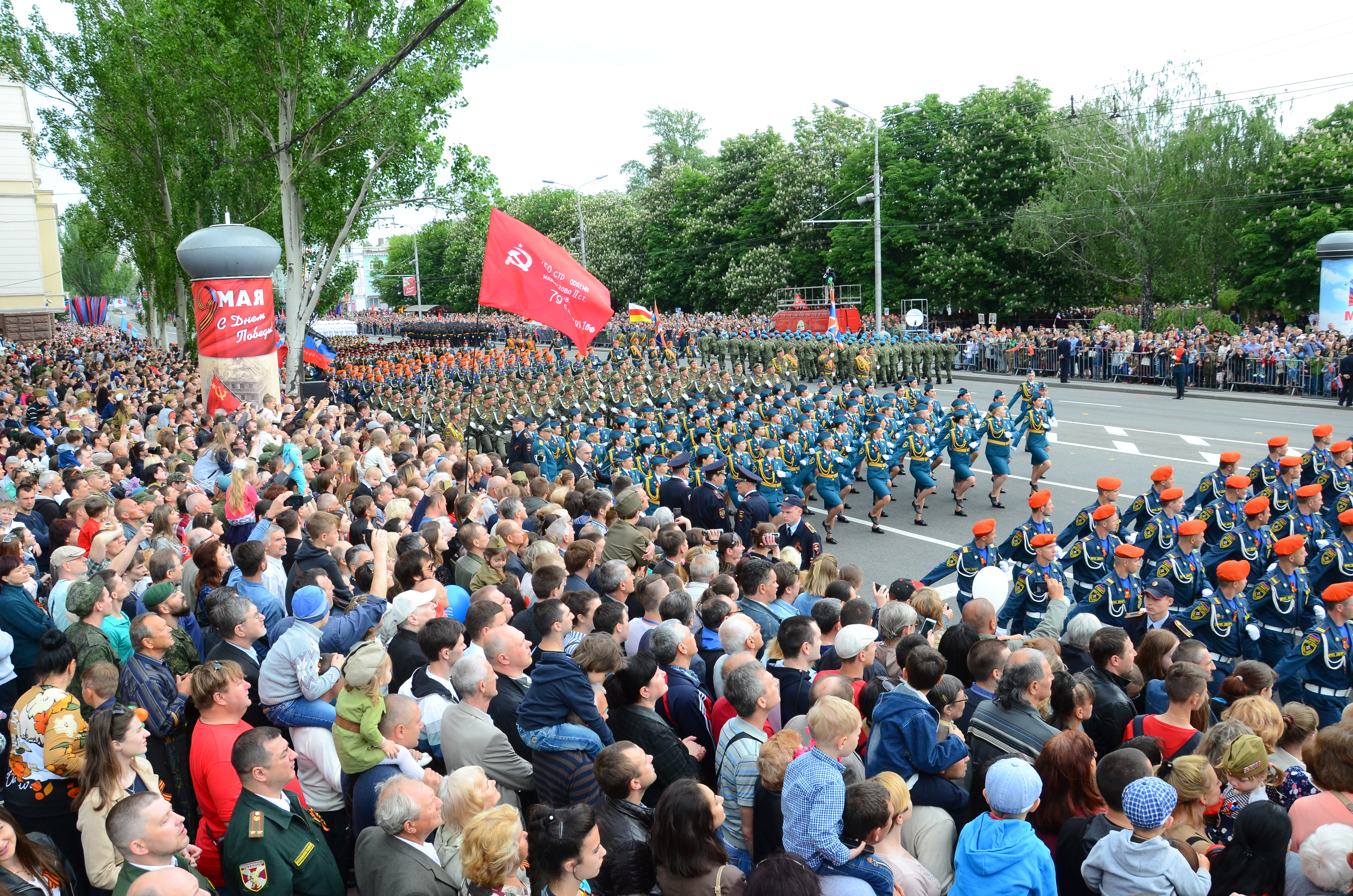
People in Donetsk celebrate the Soviet victory over Nazi Germany, 9 May 2018

Parades such as the following are traditionally held on 9 May to celebrate the victory in World War II over Nazi Germany:

- Moscow Victory Parade of 1945
- 1945 Harbin Victory Day Parade
- Parade of Guards in Leningrad
- Partisans Parade
- Red Army Parade at the Brandenburg Gate on 4 May 1945
- Moscow Victory Day Parade

In some CIS countries (of the former USSR), primarily the Russian Federation, victory parades are held annually in every major city celebrating the victory of the Soviet Union in the Great Patriotic War (1941–1945). Other victory parades honor the following:

- Abkhazian Independence Day Parade
- 1945 May 1 Parade, held on International Workers' Day and dubbed by the local media as a "Victory Parade" due to the victory over Nazi Germany that was anticipated (it would come 9 days later).

=== Serbia and the former Yugoslavia ===
- March of the Victor in Belgrade
- Liberation Parade in Skopje, Macedonia
- Operation Storm Victory Parade

=== Spain ===
- 1939 Madrid Victory Parade, held on 19 May 1939 to celebrate the Nationalist victory in the Spanish Civil War (1936–1939).

=== Turkey ===
- Victory Parade in honor of the Battle of Dumlupınar

=== Ukraine ===
- Kiev Victory Parade (1920)
- Kyiv Independence Day Parade (24 August)

=== United Kingdom ===
- 1814 London Victory Parade, celebrating the defeat and exile to Elba of Napoleon Bonaparte.
- 1919 London Victory Parade, celebrating the victory in the First World War.
- 1946 London Victory Parade, celebrating the victory in the Second World War.
- 1982 London Victory Parade, celebrating the victory in the Falklands War.
- 1945 British Hong Kong Parade, it was held on 9 October 1945 near the local Cenotaph and celebrated the reclamation of Hong Kong from Japanese rule.

=== United States ===
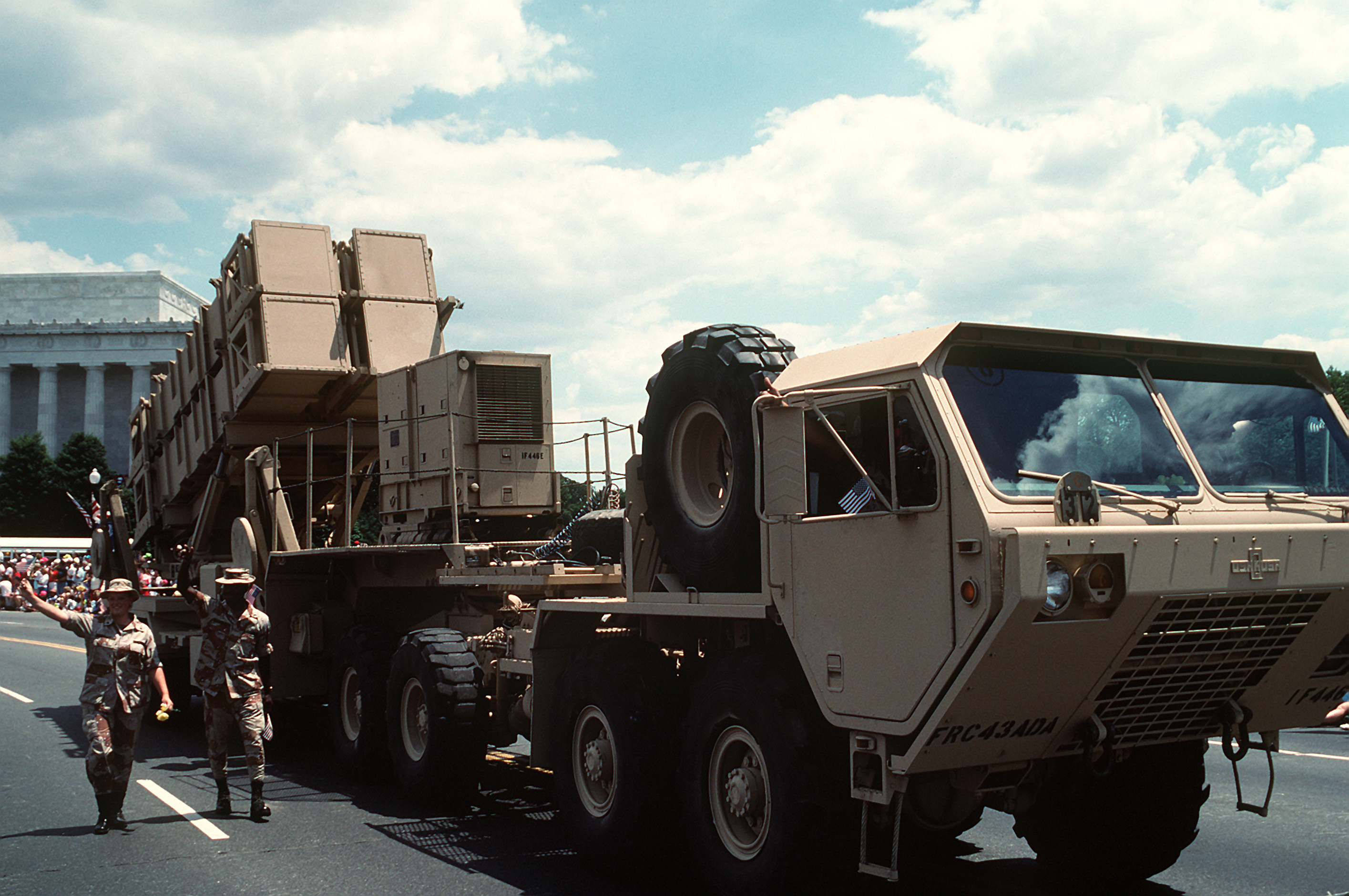
A MIM-104 Patriot tactical air defense missile system is towed by a heavy expanded mobility tactical truck in the National Victory Celebration.

- Grand Review of the Armies
- New York City Victory Parade of 1946, January 12, designated by the United States Department of War to head the G.I. Victory Parade up Fifth Avenue. The 8,800 men of the 82nd Airborne after docking in N.Y.C. harbour, aboard the Queen Mary the division was greeted by Mayor William O'Dwyer. This event was filmed by Pathe News.
- National Victory Celebration

=== Vietnam ===
- Hanoi Victory Parade – It was held on 1 January 1955 during the Vietnam War. Vietnamese leader Ho Chi Minh announced a government policy to restore the economy of North Vietnam. A Soviet film called Vietnam was released featuring the parade.

== Sports victory parades ==
=== United Kingdom sports victories ===
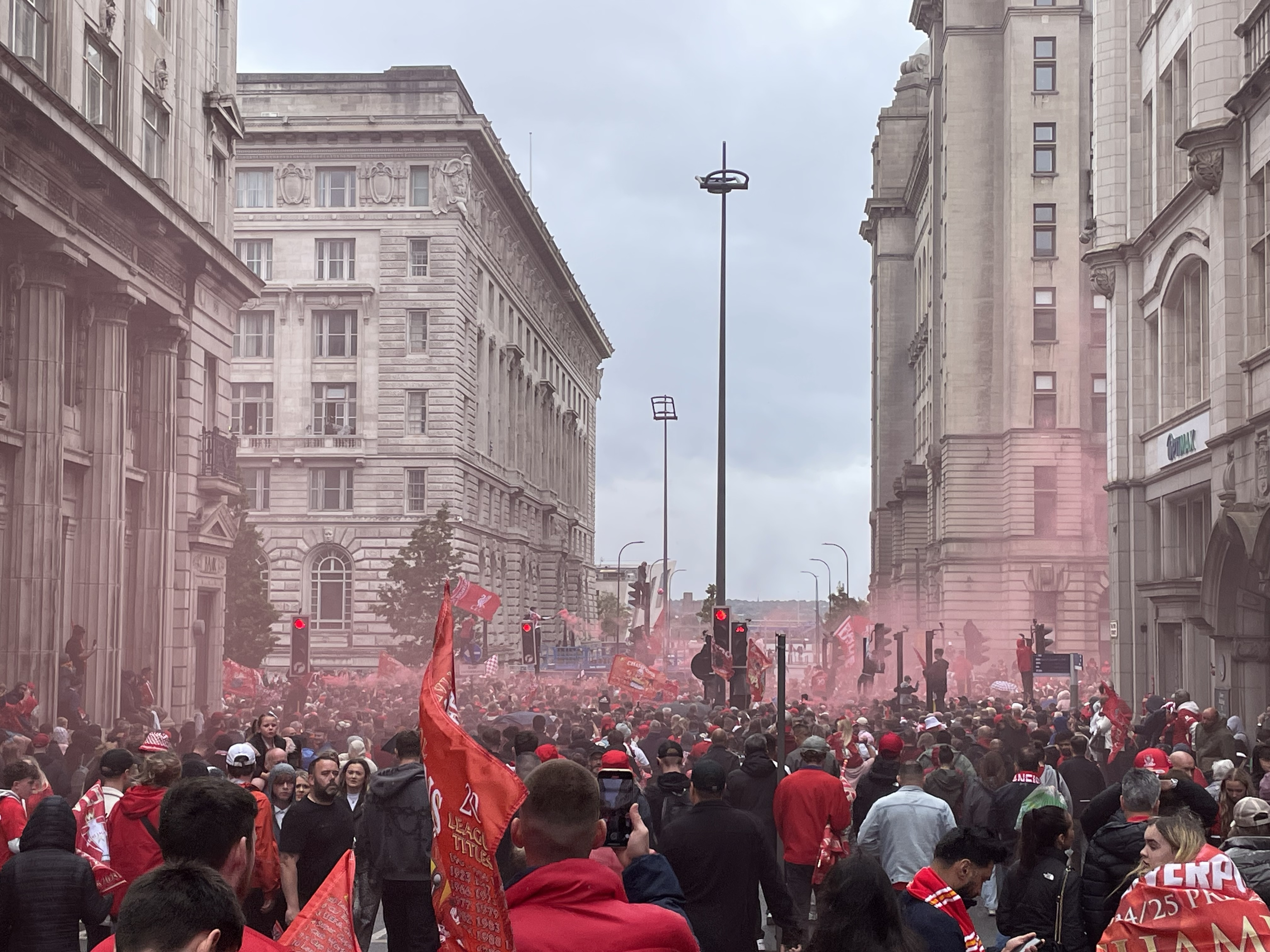
Liverpool F.C.'s 2025 Parade, looking down Dale Street on 26 May 2025.

- Our Greatest Team Parade – celebrating Britain's successful 2012 Olympic and Paralympic teams
- There is an annual victory parade to celebrate the winner of football's Premier League, held in the winner's home city, although 2016–17 champions Chelsea, 2019–20 champions Liverpool, and 2020–21 champions Manchester City did not hold it. The most recent was held in Islington, London for the 2025–26 champions Arsenal on 31 May 2026. Similar events may also apply to teams who achieved promotion or won other trophies.

=== United States and Canada sports victories ===
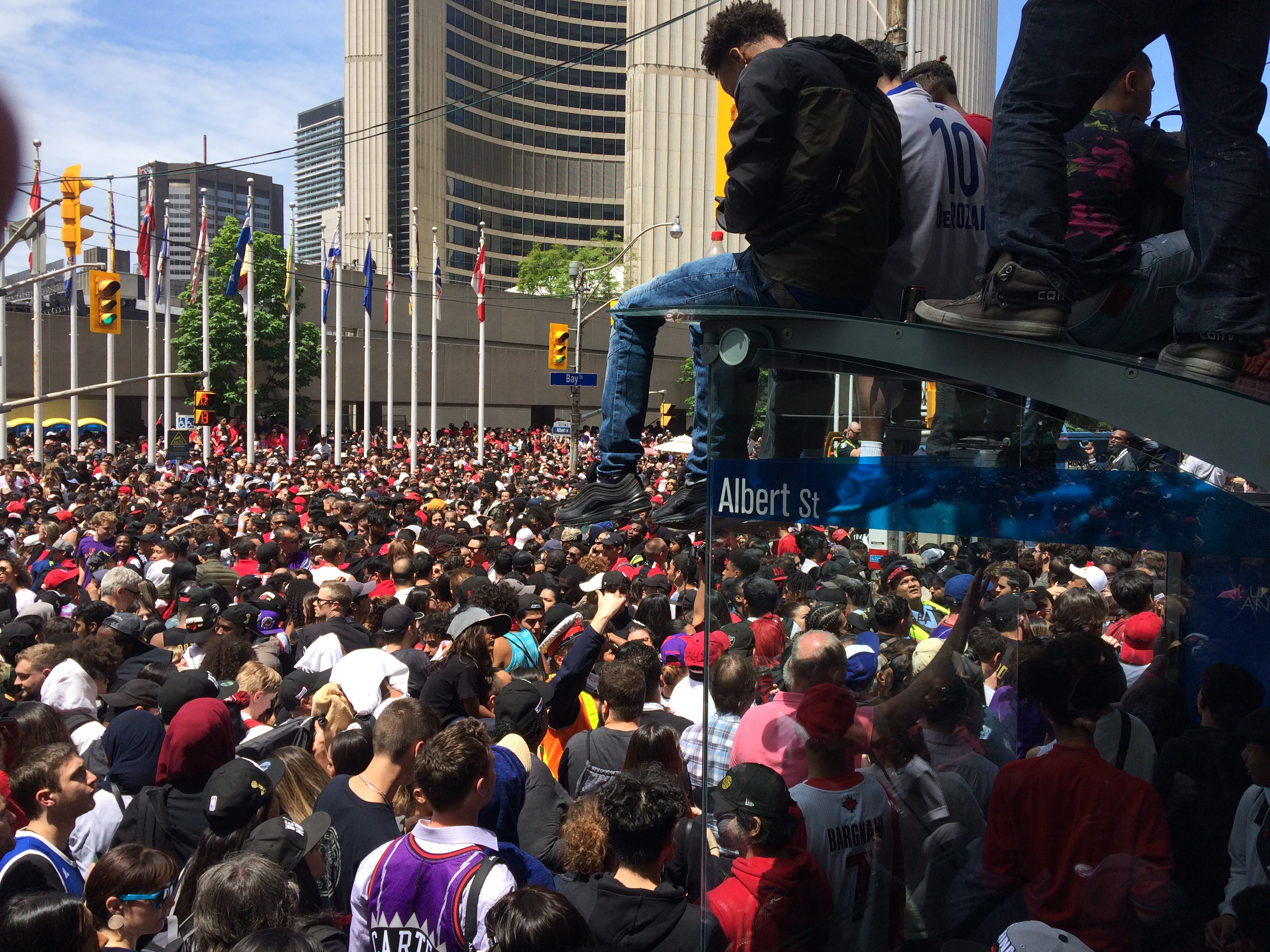
Massive amounts of people gathered to celebrate the victory of the Toronto Raptors on June 17, 2019. Estimated to have had 2 - 2.5 million people in attendance

Cities hosting the winning team in one of the four major professional sports leagues, plus Major League Soccer, will host a victory parade in the city that the team represents.

- MLB – World Series champions
  - The most recent was the 2026 Milwaukee Brewers Victory Parade in Milwaukee, Wisconsin on October 30, 2026.
- NHL – Stanley Cup champions
  - The most recent was the 2026 Carolina Hurricanes Victory Parade in Raleigh, North Carolina on June 20, 2026.
- NFL – Super Bowl champions
  - The most recent was the 2025 Seattle Seahawks Victory Parade in Seattle, Washington on February 11, 2026.
- NBA – NBA champions
  - The most recent was the 2026 New York Knicks Victory Parade in New York City on June 18, 2026.
- MLS – MLS Cup champions
  - The most recent was the 2023 Columbus Crew Victory Parade and Celebrations in Columbus, Ohio on December 12, 2023.

In addition victory parades are held on campuses of major colleges and universities to celebrate NCAA championships in football, baseball and basketball. With the creation of the Celebration Bowl in the fall of 2016, the top Football Championship Subdivision historically black college or university that has, thru this bowl game, won the Black college football national championship, is thus eligible to host such a parade on that college or university's home town or city following the Celebration Bowl championship victory.

- NCAA Division I Football Bowl Subdivision (FBS) National Champions
  - The most recent was the 2025 Indiana Hoosiers football team parade and celebrations in Bloomington, Indiana, on January 24, 2026.
- Black college football champions – NCAA FCS Division 1
  - The most recent was the 2025 South Carolina State Bulldogs football team parade and celebrations in Orangeburg, South Carolina, on January 22, 2026.

=== Hong Kong sports victories ===
The Hong Kong Government has held victory parades celebrating the city's triumphant athletes from successful major sports campaigns. These include:

- HK Coliseum, Hung Hom to Xiqu Centre, West Kowloon via Tsim Sha Tsui, 19 August 2021: celebrating the 2020 Summer Olympics team in which Hong Kong won a record six medals while also ending their 25-year gold medal drought.
- HK Sports Institute, Fo Tan to Tamar Park, Admiralty via Tai Wai, Tsim Sha Tsui and Central, 21 August 2024: celebrating the 2024 Summer Olympics team which won four medals.
- Sha Tin Town Hall to Chung On Shopping Centre, Ma On Shan, 27 October 2026: celebrating 2026 Asian Games team which won a record 54 medals, with 11 of them gold, also a new record.

== See also ==
- Roman triumph
- Victory Day
