= Our Greatest Team Parade =

2012 victory parade in London, England

- Date: 13:30, 10 September 2012 (+01:00)
- Location: London, England
- Filmed by: BBC One, Channel 4 and Sky

The Our Greatest Team Parade was a victory parade to celebrate the achievements of British athletes who competed in the 2012 Summer Olympics and 2012 Summer Paralympics. It also recognised the contributions of all the other participants and workers involved in the games. It was held on Monday 10 September 2012 at 1:30pm. The parade took place the day after the closing ceremony of the Paralympics to ensure that the maximum number of athletes were able to participate and to avoid clashing with other commitments.

== Planning ==
The parade was organised by Mayor of London Boris Johnson in association with the British Olympic Association and the British Paralympic Association. The parade was sponsored by British Airways, BP, BT, the National Lottery and Visa. The Greater London Authority also coordinated the parade with the British Olympic Association, the British Paralympic Association, Transport for London, London Organising Committee of the Olympic and Paralympic Games (LOCOG), the Metropolitan Police Service, Westminster City Council, the London Ambulance Service, the London Fire Brigade, Innovision, The Royal Parks, the BBC, Channel 4 and the City of London Corporation. The parade was part of the Look and Celebrations Programme, delivered by the Mayor of London.

== Route and viewing areas ==
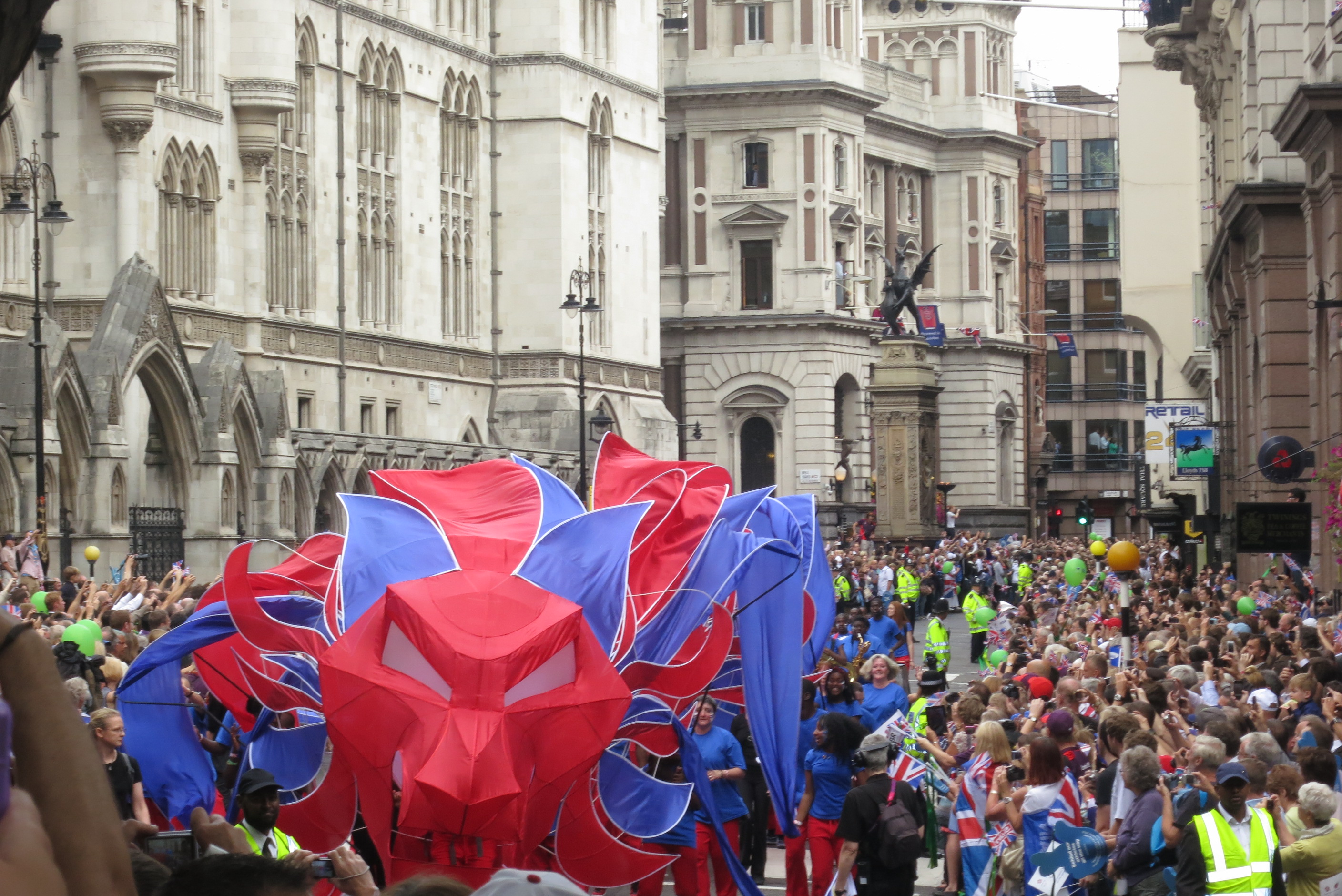
One of the giant lion heads leading the parade at St Clement Danes Church, near Aldwych

The parade set out from Mansion House at 1:30pm (BST), travelling along Queen Victoria Street and Cannon Street, including passing St Paul's Cathedral before passing along Ludgate Hill into Fleet Street and continuing towards Aldwych. It then travelled along The Strand and passed Trafalgar Square, travelling through Admiralty Arch and passing down The Mall before finishing at the Queen Victoria Memorial outside Buckingham Palace. A further celebration also took place outside Buckingham Palace.

As the parade passed Trafalgar Square, a big screen at the base of Nelson's Column allowed live commentary and also allowed the general public to further celebrate the parade.

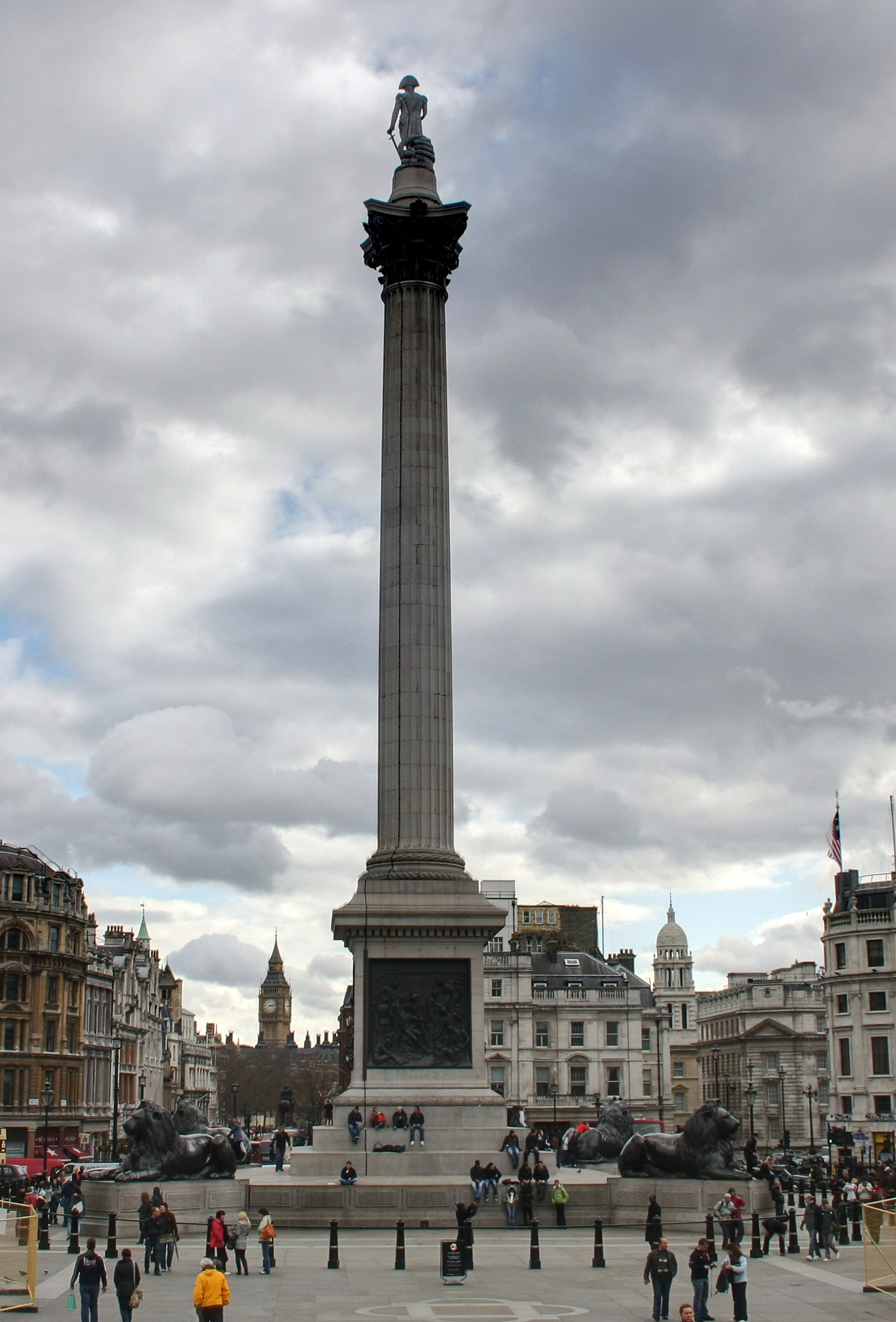
A large screen was put at the base of Nelson's Column, showing the parade

Stewarded disabled viewing areas were available at Mansion House, St Paul's Cathedral and Trafalgar Square.

Due to the previous day's 2012 Paralympic marathon and also for capacity reasons, the viewing area along The Mall between Admiralty Arch and the Memorial were restricted, reserved and ticketed only for those groups who had made invaluable contributions to the Games and their athletes. The infrastructure from the marathon was reused for the parade. The groups included members of the emergency services, military personnel, Team GB and Paralympics GB coaches and support staff, and friends and family of the athletes involved. Around 1000 school students were also invited, the numbers coming from every London borough with schools that participated in LOCOG Get Set Network. This was to ensure that one in eight 10–18-year-olds could view the parade free of charge. Invitations were also extended to Team London Ambassadors and volunteers from across the UK. In addition, an estimated 9,000 of the 70,000 volunteers (including Games Makers and Ceremonies Volunteers) won places via a ballot in The Mall in early September. The rest of the Games Makers were encouraged to line the remainder of the parade, wearing their uniforms.

Members of the Royal Family were in attendance, particularly Anne, Princess Royal, herself a former Olympian. Zara Phillips was also in attendance, but in her capacity as a member of the Great Britain Eventing Team, rather than as a royal. Family members who were not in attendance were Queen Elizabeth II, the Duke of Edinburgh, the Duke and Duchess of Cambridge, and Prince Harry, in each case due to other engagements.

== Parade and participants ==
Around 830 athletes travelled in 21 floats along the parade, with each float carrying around 40 athletes. The number of athletes include 541 athletes from the 2012 Summer Olympics and 289 athletes from the 2012 Summer Paralympics. The floats were arranged by sport and travelled in alphabetical order. The head of the parade was a commissioned carnival group Kinetika and their independent musical group Kinetika Bloco made up of young people from South London, including students from Highshore Special Needs Secondary School. The group consisted of a Brazilian Style Bloco Orchestra, Acrobatic Trickers called the Catchy Shubby Elite, dancers and the theatre group Smoking Apples carrying two giant lion heads, each with the motifs of Team GB and Paralympics GB, going first.

Medal winners were also included throughout the route, including Tom Daley, Jessica Ennis, Chris Hoy, Ben Ainslie and Mo Farah.

At any given point the parade took 13 to 15 minutes to pass. The parade between Mansion House and Trafalgar Square took 50 minutes and travelled at approximately 2 mph.

It had previously been suggested that volunteers should have been able to take part in the parade. However the organisers insisted that due to insurance and logistical reasons this was unworkable.

The Mayor of London said:

This is a chance to celebrate the heroes and heroines who have thrilled us with their skills, sportsmanship and grace during London's spectacular Olympic and Paralympic Games, and whose names and triumphs will live on for centuries to come. In the ancient world crowds would line the streets to welcome their triumphant Olympians home, where they would be ecstatically venerated and their victories chronicled for the ages, with names like Leonidas of Rhodes and Milo of Kroton reverberating through history.

Prior to the parade in an interview with The Daily Telegraph, Laura Trott stated that she thought that the parade was going to be amazing and added:

One of the best things about London 2012 was the fantastic support all Team GB competitors received from the fans at all the venues and from the British public everywhere. It's a chance for all of Team GB to say a huge 'thank you' to everybody out there who has supported us and to thank the people who made the Games possible. Hopefully it'll be a great party atmosphere and a last chance to re-live that great feeling we all experienced together during the Games. We can't wait.

== Broadcasting ==
The parade was presented live on BBC One, Channel 4 and Sky television networks.

== Fly past ==
Once the parade had made it up The Mall towards Buckingham Palace, the crowds and Team GB watched a fly past from BA and the Armed Forces consisting of the following;

- 1st wave: British Airways A319-131 - G-EUPC
- 2nd wave: 1 x Royal Navy Sea King, 2 x Army Lynx, 1 x RAF Puma
- 3rd wave: RAF E3D, 2 x RAF Typhoon
- 4th wave: RAF Red Arrows

== Post Parade ==
Prime Minister David Cameron also hosted an event afterwards to commemorate the athletes' achievements.
