= London Victory Parade of 1982 =

British victory parade after the Falklands War

- Date: 12 October 1982
- Location: London, England
- Type: Military parade
- Cause: British victory in the Falklands War
- Organised by: City of London
- Participants: United Kingdom

The London Victory Parade of 1982 was a British victory parade held following the defeat of Argentina in the Falklands War and organised by the City of London as a salute to the task force. It took place in the United Kingdom capital of London, mainly encompassing a military parade with military bands through the City of London. The parade took place on 12 October 1982, almost four months after the Argentine surrender; it was the first time the City had celebrated a military event since it had entertained the crew of HMS Amethyst in 1949.

The Parade began at Armoury House, off City Road near Finsbury Square and progressed via Finsbury Pavement, Moorgate, Lothbury, Bartholomew Lane and Threadneedle Street past Mansion House, then continued along Poultry, Cheapside and King Street to Guildhall. Approximately 300,000 people lined the mile-long route of the parade. At Mansion House the Lord Mayor of London, Sir Christopher Leaver took the salute from the armed forces personnel as they marched past. He was accompanied by Prime Minister Margaret Thatcher, Admiral Sir Terence Lewin, and the Chief of the Defence Staff, Field Marshal Sir Edwin Bramall.

During the parade, there were several protests by peace campaigners opposed to the Falklands War and what they regarded as the militarism of the parade. Seventeen people were arrested while trying to block a road to stop the parade. One of them was reportedly knocked unconscious when being thrown into the back of a police van. A group of women from the Greenham Common Women's Peace Camp staged a protest that involved turning their backs on the parade as it marched past.

After the parade there was a Salute to the Task Force luncheon at the Guildhall in which Thatcher gave a speech, saying:

We, the British people, are proud of what has been done, proud of these heroic pages in our island story, proud to be here today to salute the task force. Proud to be British.
