= James Chu =

American businessman

- Born: October 23, 1957 (age 68); Pingtung City, Taiwan
- Education: Tunghai University (no degree)
- Occupations: Chairman and CEO
- Known for: ViewSonic
- Website: https://www.viewsonic.com/us/james-chu

James Chu (born October 23, 1957) is an American businessman who founded ViewSonic, one of the largest brands in computer monitors.

== Biography ==
Chu was born October 23, 1957 in Pingtung City, Taiwan. His father was enlisted in the Republic of China Air Force, and his mother was a housewife. He is the fifth of six children.

Chu studied at the Department of Sociology at Tunghai University but dropped out before graduation.

Chu moved to California in 1986 to become the president of U.S. operations at a Taiwanese keyboard manufacturer.

== ViewSonic ==
In 1987, Chu launched Keypoint Technology Corporation, a distribution company specializing in computer peripherals. Chu introduced the ViewSonic brand of computer monitors in 1990 and renamed the company ViewSonic in 1993.

ViewSonic became one of the largest brands in monitors. In 1999, it had 6.9% of the market share in the U.S., ranking 5th nationwide behind competitors Dell, Compaq, Gateway and Hewlett-Packard.
