= Team GB =

Brand for the Great Britain and Northern Ireland Olympic Team

- Team GB branding from 2012
- Product type: National sporting branding, associated merchandising
- Current owner: British Olympic Association
- Country: United Kingdom; Crown Dependencies; All but three Overseas Territories
- Introduced: September 1999
- Registered as a trademark in: United Kingdom
- Website: www.teamgb.com

Team GB is the brand name used since 1999 by the British Olympic Association (BOA) for their British Olympic team. The brand was developed after the nation's poor performance in the 1996 Summer Olympics in Atlanta and is now a trademark of the BOA. It is meant to unify the team as one body, irrespective of each member athlete's particular sport. Officially, the team is the "Great Britain and Northern Ireland Olympic Team", although athletes from Northern Ireland may opt to compete under the auspices of the Olympic Federation of Ireland instead.

== History ==
The British Olympic Association's director of marketing, Marzena Bogdanowicz, felt that the official and abbreviated names of the Great Britain and Northern Ireland Olympic team were a mouthful. She first thought of the 'Team GB' concept in 1996 or 1997, and said: "I went to the games in 1996 in Atlanta and the logo at the time was just the lion and the rings, but we weren't strong enough as a brand to just be a lion and the rings. So coming back I wanted to find something that was less of a mouthful, and also had that team feel. We looked at the options and came up with Team GB".

The name was trademarked in September 1999 at the United Kingdom Intellectual Property Office (UK IPO).

A celebratory parade took place on 10 September 2012, commemorating the Olympic and Paralympic Games.

== Branding strategy ==
The BOA state that there "is only one Olympic team from Great Britain and Northern Ireland: Team GB. There is not an Olympic swimming team or Olympic rowing team. The individual sports join to become Team GB, the Great Britain and Northern Ireland Olympic Team."

The Team GB brand was used as part of a licensing and merchandising strategy following the BOA's athletes success at the 2000 Summer Olympics in Sydney, Australia. Bogdanowicz stated that the BOA wanted to "cement the Team GB brand in the minds of the British public".

== Calls for renaming ==
The team is officially known as the Great Britain and Northern Ireland Olympic Team.

In June 2009, Northern Ireland's Democratic Unionist Sports Minister Gregory Campbell suggested that the name should be changed as the abbreviated form was not inclusive enough as it "excludes, and indeed alienates, the people of Northern Ireland". Campbell's successor, Nelson McCausland, also suggested that an alternative name be found.

A significant complication is that the Olympic Council of Ireland (OCI), established in 1920, as the 'Irish Olympic Council', but not admitted by the IOC until June 1922, whilst all of Ireland was part of the United Kingdom, claims to represent the whole island of Ireland and not merely the Republic. The OCI and the BOA have an agreement under which athletes from Northern Ireland may choose to compete for either team.

The BOA has rejected calls for the name to be changed to Team UK, arguing that neither Team GB nor Team UK are entirely accurate, given that neither term covers all the members of its association, and that Team GB is an "effective trading name that fitted best with the Olympic identification of GBR".

The existence of a Team GB has been criticised by Welsh and Scottish nationalists, advocating for separate Welsh and Scottish Olympic teams instead. These teams representing the four home nations of England, Northern Ireland, Scotland and Wales are currently used in the Commonwealth Games. Criticism of specific sport teams representing Great Britain instead of their home nations have also been voiced, especially in association football where the four nations compete separately, and fears a GB football team would threaten their separate national football teams. Some Welsh footballers, playing for a GB Olympic football team, did not sing "God Save the Queen", the national anthem used, in 2012, facing some criticism, however the team's manager stated it was a personal decision.

== Reception ==
The Team GB branding has been credited with creating a 'team feel', and direct comparisons were made of the performance at the 1996 Olympic Games in which the BOA's representatives won one gold medal, and the 2000 games where Great Britain and Northern Ireland performed under the Team GB name and returned with eleven gold medals.

Comedian and columnist David Mitchell described the BOA's decision to create a nickname and rebrand their representative team as "capitalism's final victory" and "pathetic", going on to say that anyone who thought rebranding the Olympic squad has helped win more medals "are either morons or they think our athletes are". Scottish columnist Gerry Hassan commented that "Team GB represents something which is a fiction and an illusion which doesn't correspond with any political form".

== Arms ==
Coat of arms of Team GB
Notes Adopted 27 April 2016 Crest On a Helm with a Wreath Argent, Gules and Azure: Within a Coronet comprising a Rim set with six Batons erect Or between Roundels alternately of Silver Gold and Bronze proper a Lion statant guardant Gules crowned with a Laurel Wreath the dexter forepaw raised and holding a Torch enflamed Or. Escutcheon Quarterly Gules and Azure two Leeks in pale that in base reversed and conjoined at the fess point to two Thistles in fess two Roses in bend and two Flax Flowers in bend sinister all with heads outwards and slipped and leaved Or the whole enfiling four Links of Chain interlaced in a square Argent. Supporters On either side a Lion guardant that on the dexter Azure that on the sinister Gules each crowned with a Laurel Wreath and holding in the exterior forepaw a Torch enflamed Or both upon a Compartment comprising a Grassy Mount Vert. Motto IUNCTI IN UNO
