= 1945 Harbin Victory Day Parade =

The 1945 Harbin Victory Day Parade (Russian: Парад Победы в Харбине) was a solemn military parade of troops from the Soviet Red Army in the Chinese city of Harbin on 16 September 1945. It took place over 2 weeks after the Surrender of Japan to the United States and allied forces on 2 September. The parade honored the Soviet victories over the Empire of Japan during the Soviet invasion of Manchuria and the larger Second World War. The main event was held on Cathedral Square while the parade passed through Vokzalny Avenue and Kitayskaya Street. Members of the Soviet government, Red Army officers and military officials from the Republic of China and the Northeast Anti-Japanese United Army attended the parade.

Colonel General Afanasy Beloborodov inspected and presided over the parade while Artillery General Konstantin Kazakov commanded it. Beloborodov was the commanding officer of the 1st Red Banner Army at the time. At 11:00 am, Beloborodov arrived on the square where the troops of the Harbin Garrison were assembled for the parade. After receiving a report from Kazakov, he inspected the troops before he extended his greetings in a speech. The columns of troops marching on the square included infantry, signalmen, sappers, mortar men. Major General Aleksandr Cherepanov led the first contingents on parade. In the mobile column, mortars and Katyusha rocket launcher passed through followed by the motorized infantry. The two hour parade concluded when tank engines finally went through the square and a military band departed as well.

The parade is notable in that it was the only one ever held in honor of Victory over Japan Day. Soviet leader Joseph Stalin ordered that the country's only V-J Day parade not be held on Soviet territory, for reasons unknown to present. A parade that was held in the Belarusian capital of Minsk the same day was held separately in connection with the anniversary of the Soviet annexation of Western Belorussia. After the parade, a monument to Soviet soldiers who fell during the liberation of the city was erected on Cathedral Square.

== See also ==
- Berlin Victory Parade of 1945
- 2015 China Victory Day Parade
- Partisans Parade
