= ViewSonic =

American electronics company

ViewSonic Corporation
- Formerly: Keypoint Technology Corporation (1987–1993)
- Type: Private
- Industry: Computer hardware Electronics
- Founded: 1987; 39 years ago
- Founder: James Chu
- Headquarters: Brea, California, United States
- Key people: James Chu, Founder, CEO
- Products: Digital Whiteboards, Large format displays, Monitors, Projectors, Pen Displays, SaaS, AI Services, Interactive Content.
- Revenue: $1 billion (2023)
- Number of employees: 1,400 (2023)
- Website: www.viewsonic.com

ViewSonic Corporation is an American privately held multinational electronics company with headquarters in Brea, California, United States.

The company was founded in 1987 as Keypoint Technology Corporation by James Chu and was renamed to its present name in 1993, after a brand name of monitors launched in 1990. Today, ViewSonic specializes in visual display hardware—including liquid-crystal displays, projectors, and interactive whiteboards—as well as digital whiteboarding software. The company trades in three key markets: education, enterprise, and entertainment.

== Company history ==
The company was initially founded as Keypoint Technology Corporation in 1987 by James Chu. In 1990, it launched the ViewSonic line of color computer monitors, and shortly afterward the company renamed itself after its monitor brand. The ViewSonic logo features Gouldian finches, colorful birds native to Australia.

In the mid-1990s, ViewSonic rose to become one of the top-rated makers of computer CRT monitors, alongside Sony, NEC, MAG InnoVision, and Panasonic. ViewSonic soon displaced the rest of these companies to emerge as the largest display manufacturer from America/Japan at the turn of the millennium.

In 2000, ViewSonic acquired the Nokia Display Products' branded business. In 2002 ViewSonic announced a 3840x2400 WQUXGA, 22.2-inch monitor, VP2290. In 2005, ViewSonic and Tatung won a British patent lawsuit filed against them by LG Philips in a dispute over which company created technology for rear mounting of LCDs in a mobile PC (U.K. Patent GB2346464B, titled “portable computer"). On July 2, 2007, the company filed with the Securities and Exchange Commission to raise up to $143.8M in an IPO on NASDAQ. On March 5, 2008, the company filed a withdraw request with the Securities and Exchange Commission saying "terms currently obtainable in the public marketplace are not sufficiently attractive to the Registrant to warrant proceeding with the initial public offering".

In 2017, ViewSonic entered the interactive whiteboard market with its ViewBoard flat panels and myViewBoard software. ViewSonic was named a best-selling collaboration display brand in 2018. By 2019, more than 5,500 elementary and junior high schools in the United States had installed ViewBoards, and ViewSonic ranked third in global interactive display market share, excluding China. ViewSonic became a Google for Education partner in 2019 and a Microsoft Education partner in 2020.

== Operations ==
ViewSonic has its headquarters in Brea, California, United States and a research & development center in New Taipei City, Taiwan. As of 2021, ViewSonic is selling globally with offices in Canada, Germany, the United Kingdom, France, Russia, Italy, Ukraine, Turkey, Spain, Sweden, Greece, Switzerland, Australia, Taiwan, Malaysia, India, South Korea, United Arab Emirates, Singapore, Japan, and the United States.

== Product history ==
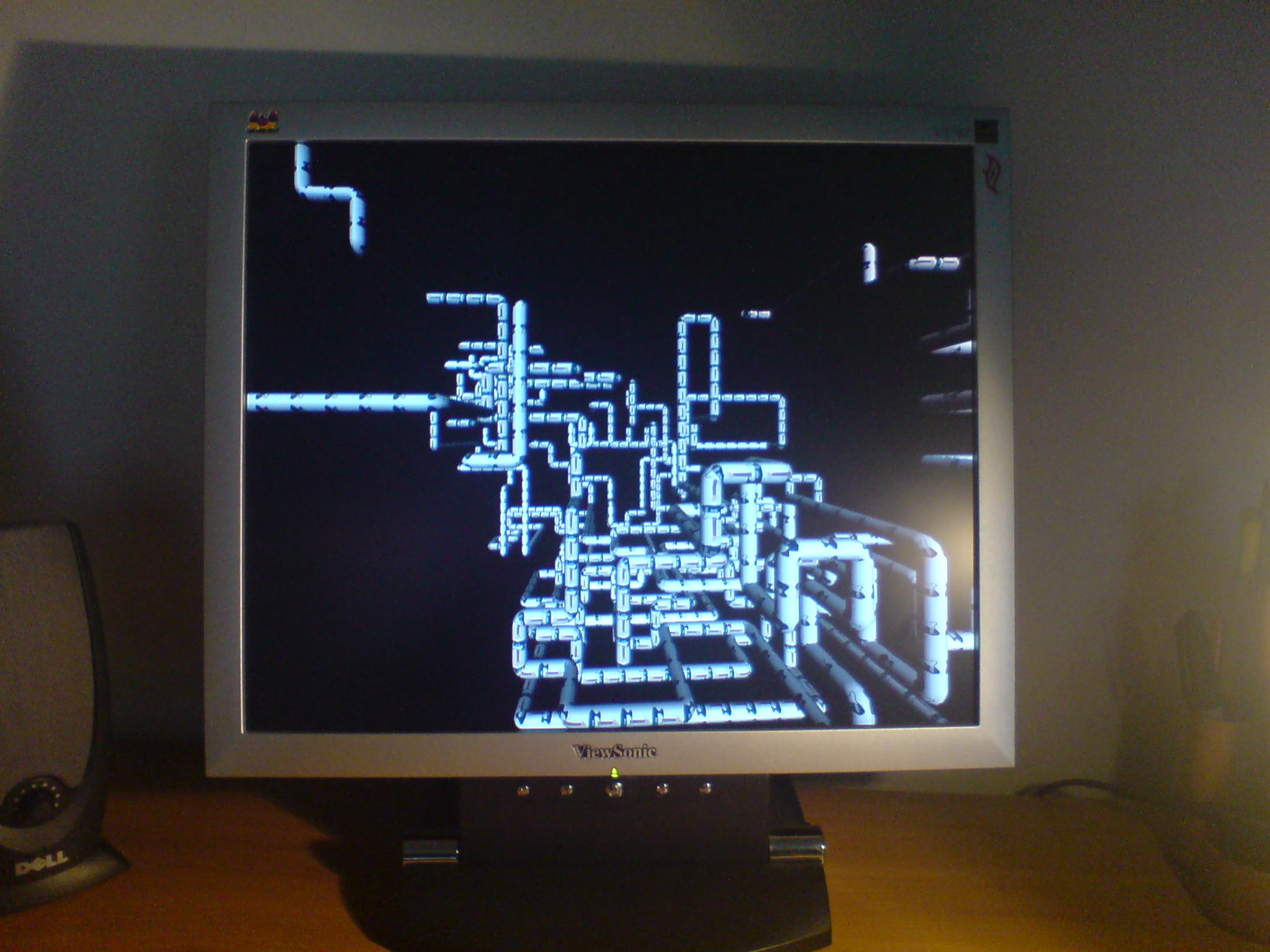
A ViewSonic 17-inch LCD monitor

In 1998, ViewSonic announced that two of its Professional Series monitors achieved TCO '99 certification. In 2000, ViewSonic partnered with AT&T Corporation to offer Internet appliances integrated with the AT&T WorldNet Service, initially targeting the corporate market. The Internet appliances ranged from standalone i-boxes, integrated LCD and CRT devices, to web phones and wireless web pads. The units were deemed capable of operating on nearly any operating system, including Windows CE, Linux, QNX and VxWorks. In 2002, ViewSonic announced a 3840x2400 WQUXGA, 22.2-inch monitor, VP2290. At the 2007 Consumer Electronics Show, ViewSonic introduced display products, namely a projector, monitors and an HDTV set, capable of being connected directly to a video iPod.

On May 31, 2011, the ViewPad 7x debuted at the Computex computer show in Taipei, Taiwan, Pocket-Lint reported, being a follow-up rather than a replacement to ViewSonic's existing ViewPad 7 tablet, which runs Android 2.2, a.k.a. Froyo. In 2017, ViewSonic rolled out its ViewBoard smart interactive whiteboards. By 2019, more than 5,500 elementary and junior high schools in the United States had installed ViewBoards, and ViewSonic ranked third in global interactive display market share (excluding China). In September 2017, ViewSonic broadened its large‑format line‑up with the 32‑inch and 43‑inch VX‑series displays (VX3211‑mh/‑2K‑mhd and VX4380‑4K) alongside the curved 32‑inch XG3202‑C gaming monitor.

In December 2018, the company introduced the XG240R, the first model under its ELITE gaming sub‑brand to feature synchronised rear‑mounted RGB lighting that integrates with third‑party peripherals. In September 2019, ViewSonic previewed the ELITE XG270QG, a 27‑inch Nano‑IPS gaming monitor offering a 165 Hz refresh rate, NVIDIA G‑Sync support and built‑in dual mouse‑bungee guides aimed at esports users. The pocket‑sized M1 Mini LED projector secured an iF Design Award in February 2020, recognised for its flip‑out stand that doubles as a lens cover and its integrated JBL speaker.

In August 2021, ViewSonic introduced two Pantone‑validated ColorPro displays—the VP2756‑2K and VP2756‑4K—with ΔE < 2 factory calibration and single‑cable USB‑C connectivity for creative professionals. The 24‑inch ID2456 touch display earned a “Best of Show” award from Tech & Learning at InfoComm 2022 for its 10‑point stylus input and USB‑C docking design. At InfoComm 2023, ViewSonic’s 105‑inch ViewBoard IFP105S interactive display and the 163‑inch LDP163‑181 direct‑view LED wall each received “Best of Show” honours from the industry publications AV Technology and Digital Signage.

In June 2024, ViewSonic unveiled a line‑up of ultra‑wide ViewBoard interactive displays, direct‑view LED panels and Microsoft Teams Rooms collaboration bundles at the InfoComm 2024 trade show in Las Vegas. On 20 August 2024, the company introduced the XG36‑series gaming monitors (XG2736‑2K and XG2536), offering refresh rates up to 240 Hz and 0.5 ms response times. At Pepcom Digital Experience on 6 January 2025, ViewSonic announced three desktop monitors for 2025 release: the wireless‑casting VG2748N, the colour‑accurate VP2788‑5K and the dual‑mode gaming XG275D‑4K. A TechRadar preview called the VP2788‑5K “the smallest 5 K monitor yet,” citing its Thunderbolt 4 connectivity and 99% DCI‑P3 gamut.

In January 2025, ViewSonic introduced the Chromebox OPS (Open Pluggable Specification) module alongside new Android Enterprise Device Licensing Agreement (EDLA)-certified ViewBoard interactive displays. Designed for the education sector, the ChromeOS-powered module allows educators to integrate Google Admin console management and Chrome Web Store applications directly into OS-free ViewBoard displays. In April 2025, the firm debuted the M1 Max portable LED projector, featuring 360‑degree sound and built‑in Google TV, with initial availability in Europe from April and Asian markets from May 2025.

In January 2026, ViewSonic expanded its direct-view LED (dvLED) portfolio with the LDE Series. The pre-configured, all-in-one displays feature a 52 mm profile that integrates power, control, and image stitching directly into the cabinet, eliminating the need for an external control box while reducing the unit's overall weight by up to 28% compared to standard models. Later in January 2026, the company debuted the ViewBoard IFP35-1 and IFP41-1 series, marking the industry's first interactive education displays powered by the Android 16 operating system. The EDLA-certified panels feature 64-point multi-touch technology, integrated ambient light and motion sensors for energy efficiency, and an updated version of the myViewBoard digital whiteboarding software.

== See also ==
- List of computer system manufacturers
