= Flag Day of the Finnish Defence Forces =

Finnish national holiday

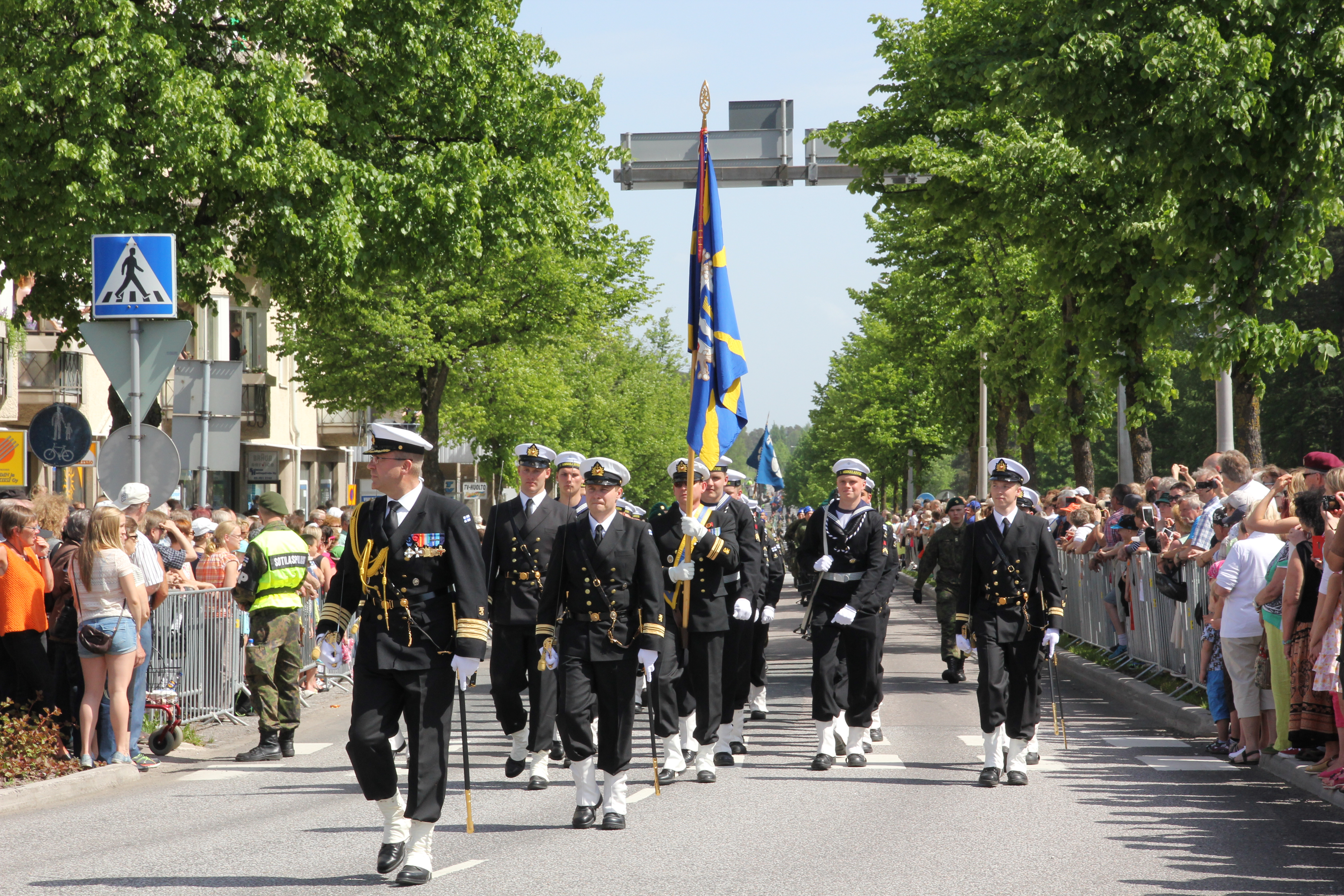
- The Nyland Brigade (Finnish: Uudenmaan prikaati) at the 2014 Festival Parade of the Finnish Defence Forces on Valtakatu street in Lappeenranta, Finland
- Official name: puolustusvoimain lippujuhlan päivä (Finnish) försvarets fanfest (Swedish)
- Observed by: Finland
- Significance: The day celebrating the Finnish Defence Forces, which is designated as the birthday of Marshal C. G. E. Mannerheim since 1942.
- Celebrations: Military parade
- Date: June 4
- Next time: 4 June 2027
- Frequency: Annual

The Flag Day of the Finnish Defence Forces (Finnish: puolustusvoimain lippujuhlan päivä; Swedish: försvarets fanfest) is celebrated annually on June 4th in Finland, also known as the birthday of Marshal C. G. E. Mannerheim (1867–1951), and is the official Finnish flag-flying day. On the flag day, medals are awarded and distinguished soldiers and reservists are promoted.

== History ==
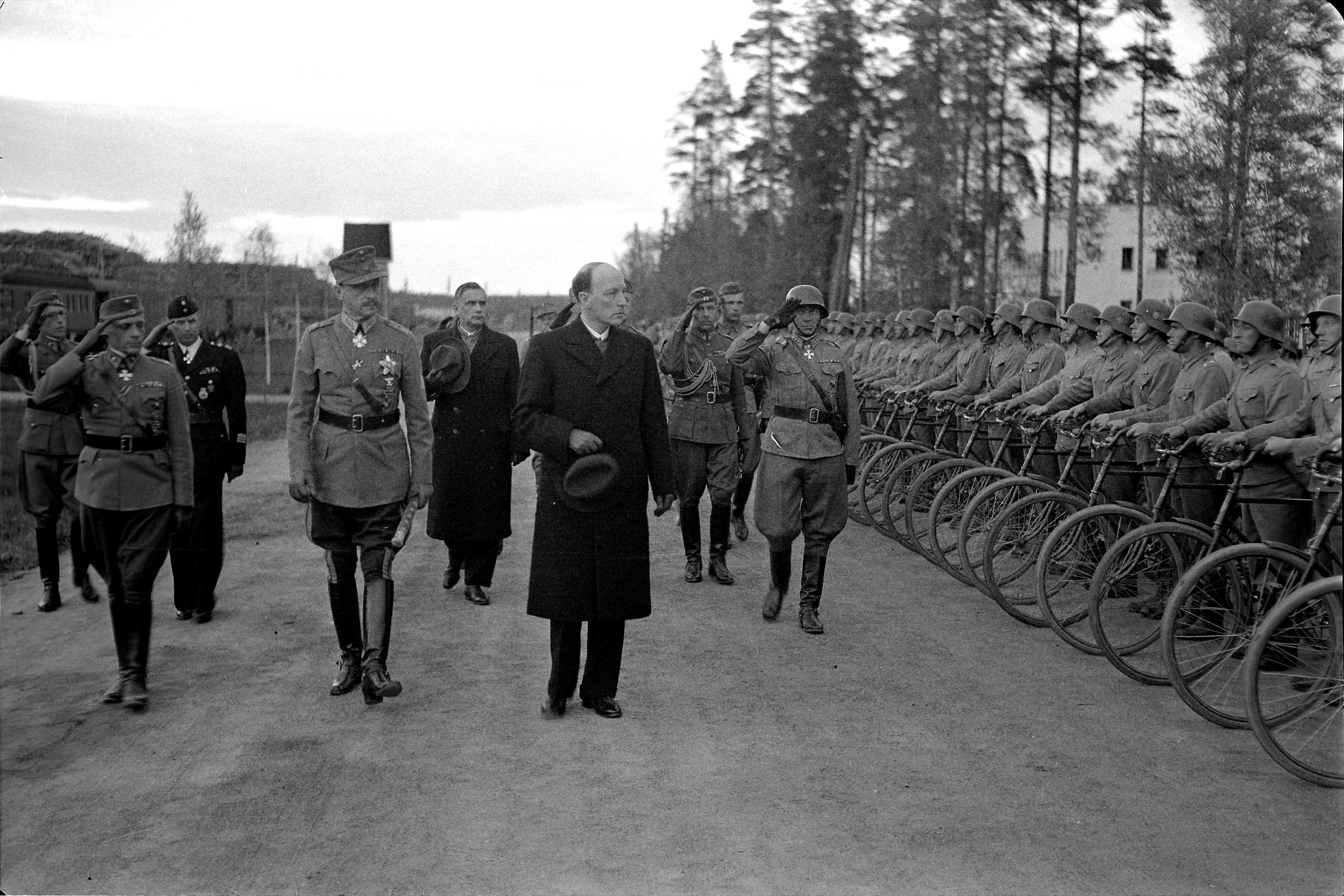
Marshal Mannerheim and President Risto Ryti inspect troops in Enso (today Svetogorsk) on the Marshal's birthday in 1944.

During 1919–1939 the Flag Day of the Military (Finnish: Sotaväen lippujuhlan päivä) was celebrated on May 16th, as the Victory Day of the Troops of the Republic of Finland, i. e. the Whites over the Reds in the Civil War in 1918. President K. J. Ståhlberg confirmed the Day of the War People's flag fest as an official holiday in 1921. At first, the flag ceremony was mainly a celebration for the bourgeoisie, but in 1927 the parade was hosted by the Social Democratic Prime Minister Väinö Tanner, who had been acting as President of the Republic during President L. K. Relander's sick leave.

In 1942, during Mannerheim's 75th birthday, the Finnish government declared that from then on June 4th would officially celebrated as the Birthday of Marshal of Finland (Finnish: Suomen marsalkan syntymäpäivä). When the 85th anniversary of Mannerheim's birth had passed and Finland was about to celebrate its 35th anniversary in 1952, the flag-flying ceremony of the Defence Forces was celebrated with a parade in Helsinki's Senate Square. Forty contingents totaling over two thousand people from the Defence Forces and the Border Guard participated in the parade. The parade was received by President J. K. Paasikivi together with Aarne Sihvo, the Chief of Defence.

== Culture ==
=== Food ===
Traditional and valuable delicacies for the holiday include, in particular, Mannerheim's favorite pikeperch delicacy called "Kyyveijn kuhho", while in the garrisons, lunch may follow the traditional camp format or be served more casually during the holiday season, such as berry or fruit kissel and soldiers' home doughnuts.

=== In popular culture ===
In Väinö Linna's 1954 war novel The Unknown Soldier and its all film adaptations from 1955 to 2017, there is a scene where Finnish soldiers celebrate Mannerheim's 75th birthday by drinking cut cognac ("leikattu konjakki") and home-brewed kilju.

== See also ==
- Armed Forces Day
- Flag flying days in Finland
- Hitler and Mannerheim recording
- 1918 White victory parade in Helsinki
- Võidupüha – an Estonian Victory Day
