= Belgrade Military Parade =

Event in Belgrade, Serbia

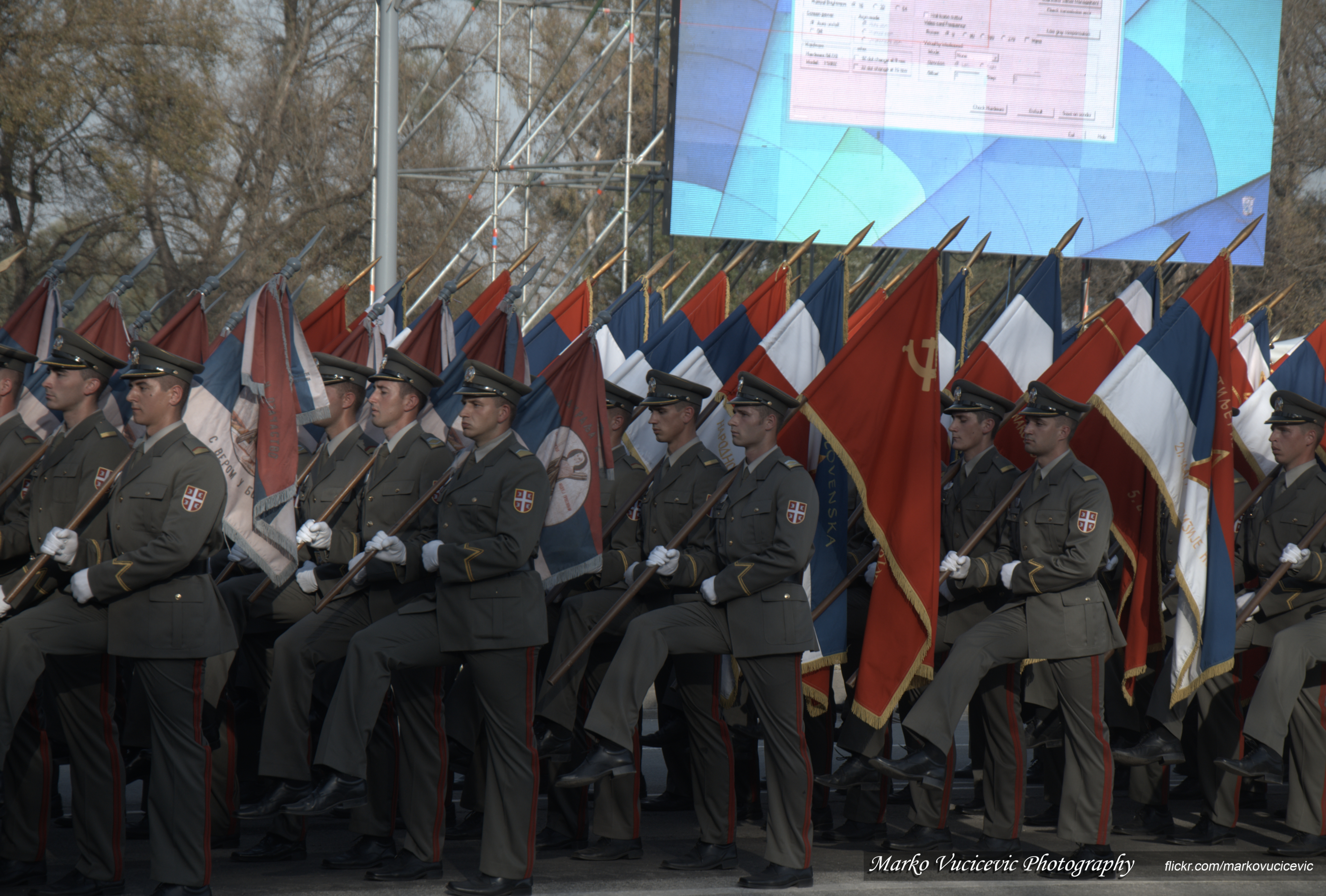
- Serbian soldiers with war flags.
- Date: 16 October 2014
- Location: Nikola Tesla Boulevard, Belgrade, Serbia
- Also known as: March of the Victor

The Belgrade Military Parade, known as Korak pobednika ("Step/March of the Victor"), was a military parade on Nikola Tesla Boulevard on 16 October 2014, during the 70th anniversary of the liberation of Belgrade. The city was liberated from the hands of the Nazis by the Yugoslav Partisans with the help of the Red Army during the Belgrade Offensive on 20 October 1944. It was the first military parade in the country for 30 years, and included 4,500 Serbian troops, as well as a minor number of Russian troops and the Russian aerobatic team, Swifts. President Tomislav Nikolić and Prime Minister Aleksandar Vučić attended the parade, with Russian President Vladimir Putin attending as the guest of honour. Participants in the parade were given awards for their participation, in December at Topčider.

== Composition of the parade ==
=== Ground Column ===
- Commander of the Parade - General Ljubiša Diković
- Members of the General Staff
- Color Guard
- Admiral of the Land Brigade
- The Training Command Module
- Aircraft Settings and Air Force and Air Defence
- Post Office Fleet
- Postal Unit of the Military Police
- Special Brigade post
- Military Academy Post-graduates
- Guard of the Serbian Armed Forces
- Representative Band of the Serbian Guards Unit

=== Mobile Column ===
- Special power set (10 Difender vehicles, 10 Puh vehicles, 10 Pincgauer motor vehicles, Vrabac unmanned vehicles)
- Brigade bindings (21 vehicles with telecommunication and IT support)
- PVO artillery-rocket units
- KUB missile system
- Setup SVLR 128mm Fire (18 SVLR Fire)
- Nora
- HMMWV motor vehicles
- police vehicles
- anti-skid artillery
- Engine unit setup
- Nora B-52s
- M-11
- MIP-11
- M-80A IFV
- M-84 tanks

=== Air Column ===
- parachute helicopter group
- MiG-29 aircraft
- MiG-21 aircraft
- Eagle Airplanes
- G-4 Group of Aircraft
- An-26 Flight Group
- Lasta aircraft
- Mi-8/17 aircraft
- Gazela aircraft
- Air Combat Aircraft"

=== Naval Column ===
- RPC-111 patrol boat
- Kozara Special-purpose boat
- RSRB-36 Special-purpose boat
- RML-341 river miners
- RML-332 river miners
- RML-336 river miners
- RML-335 river miners
- DJČ-411 assault boat
- DJČ-412 assault boat
- DJČ-413 assault boat
- RPČ-22 river patrol boats
- RPČ-213 river patrol boats
- RPČ-212 river patrol boats
- RPČ-216 river patrol boat

== Gallery ==
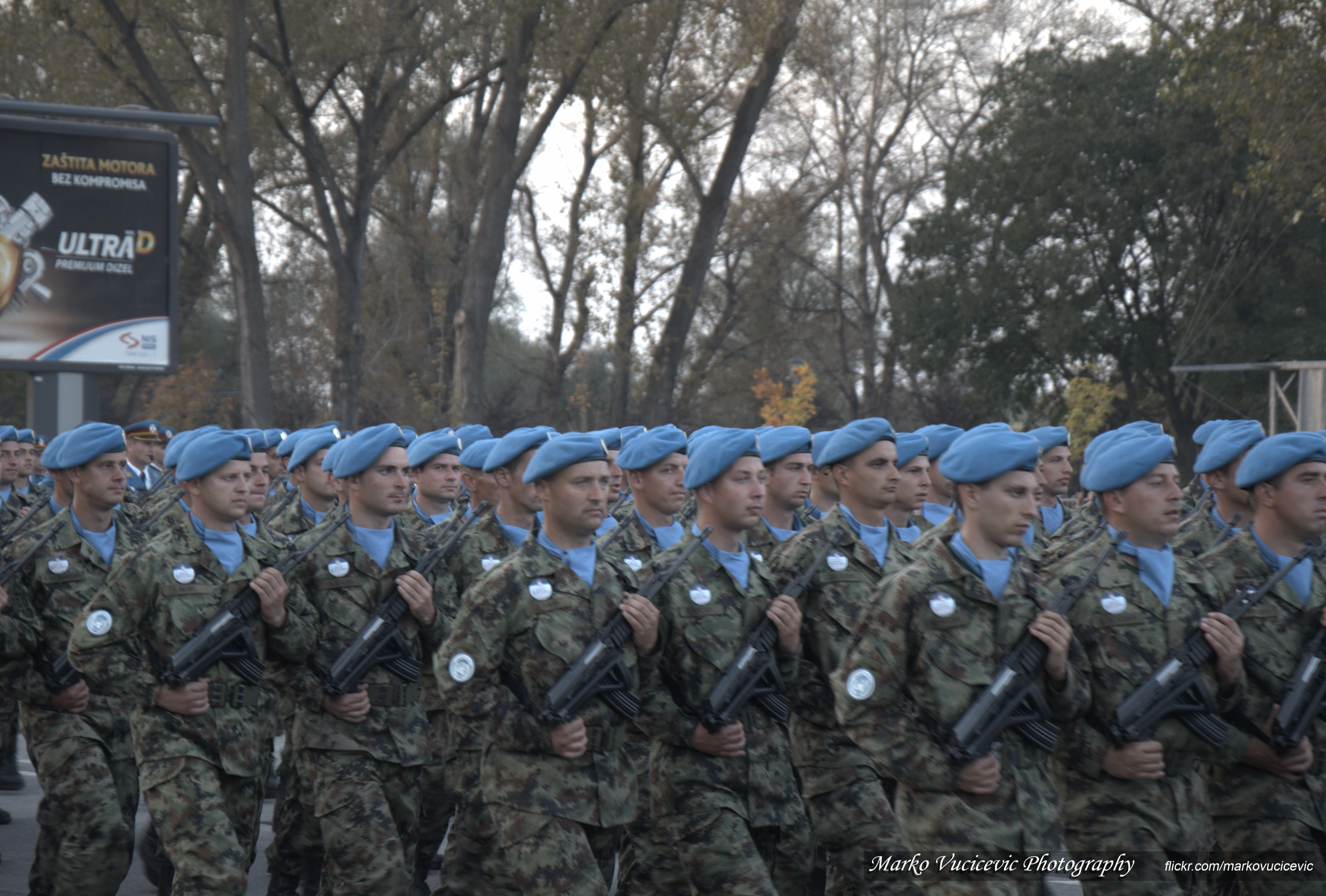
Soldiers in military uniforms.

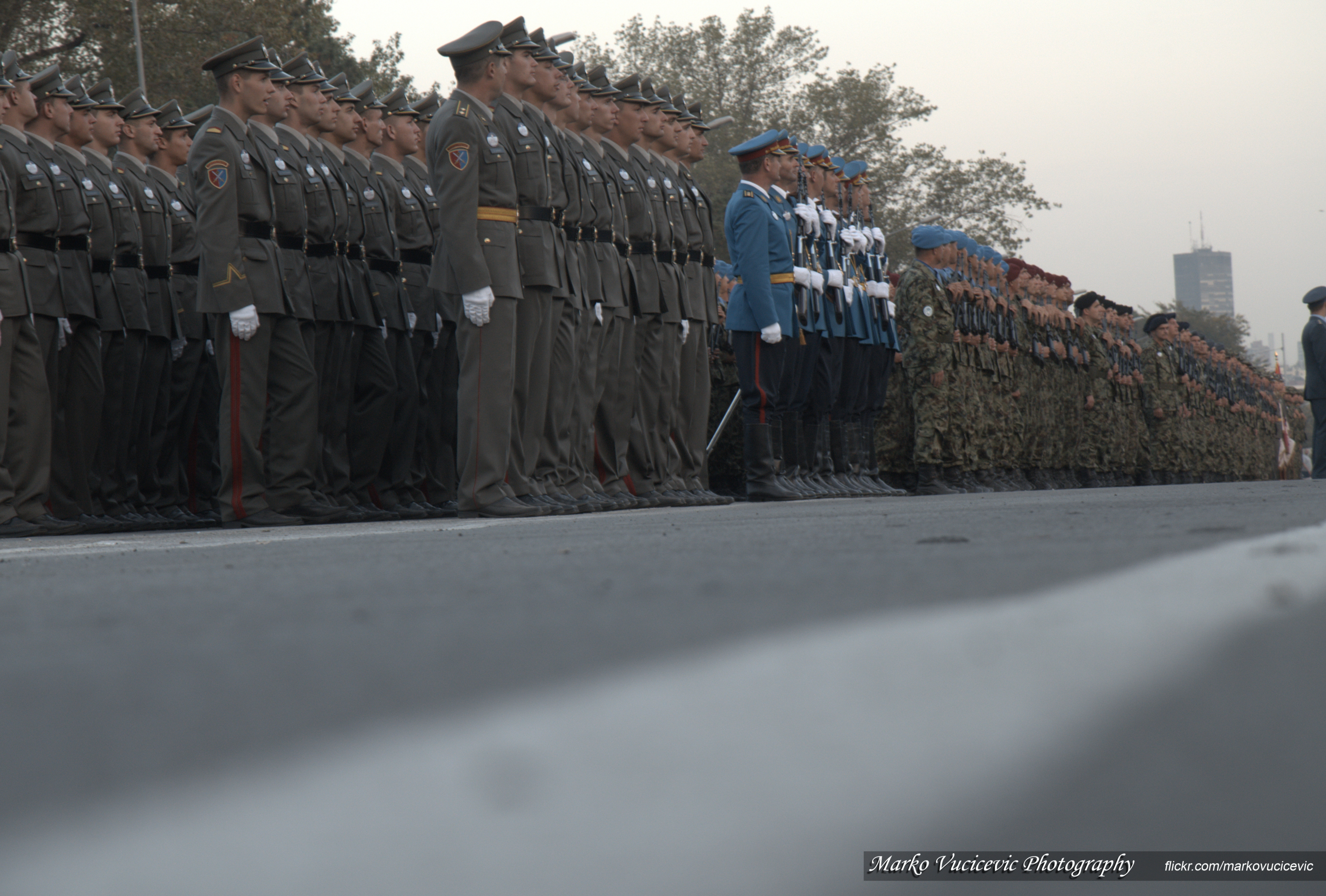
Soldiers

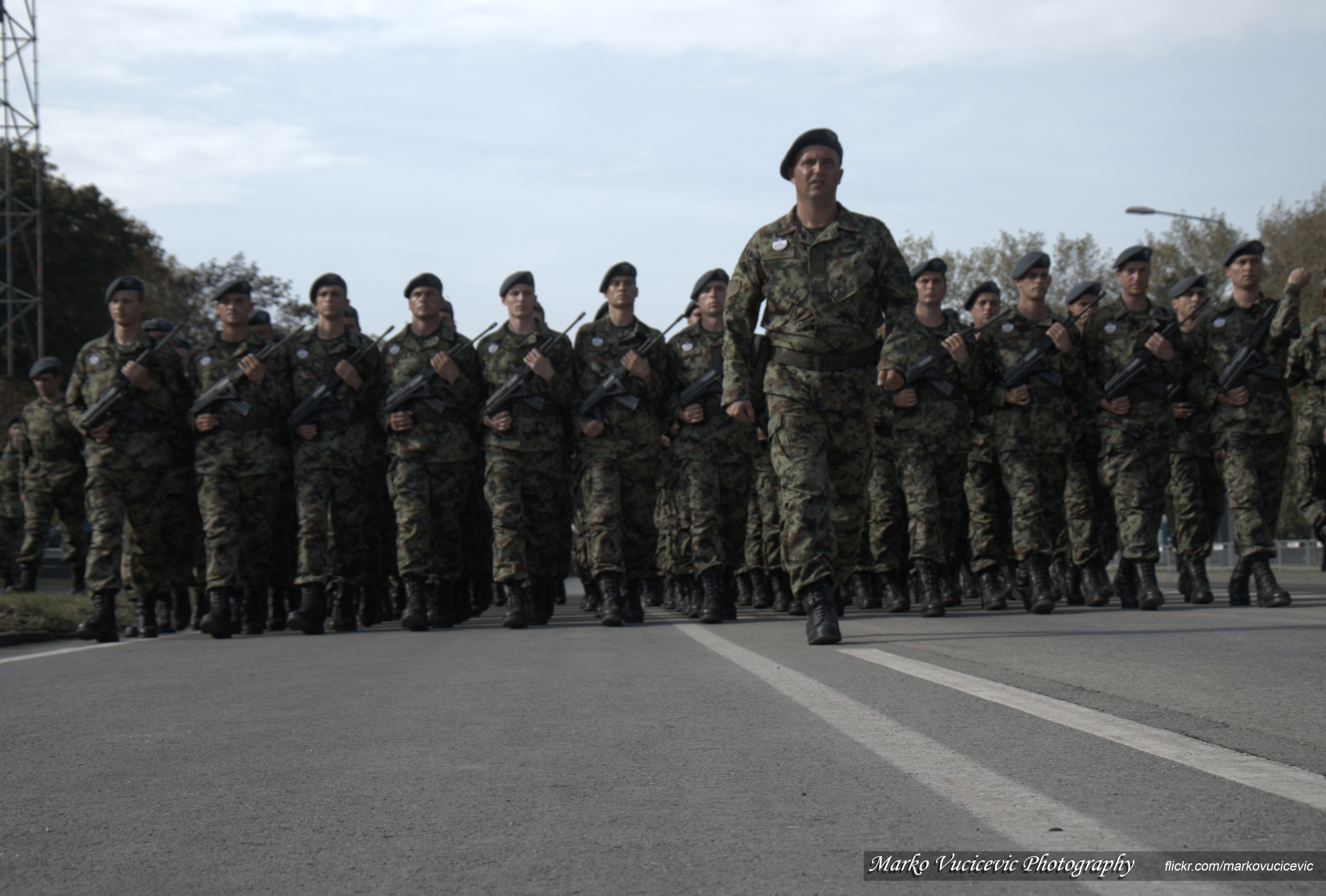
Soldiers in military uniforms.

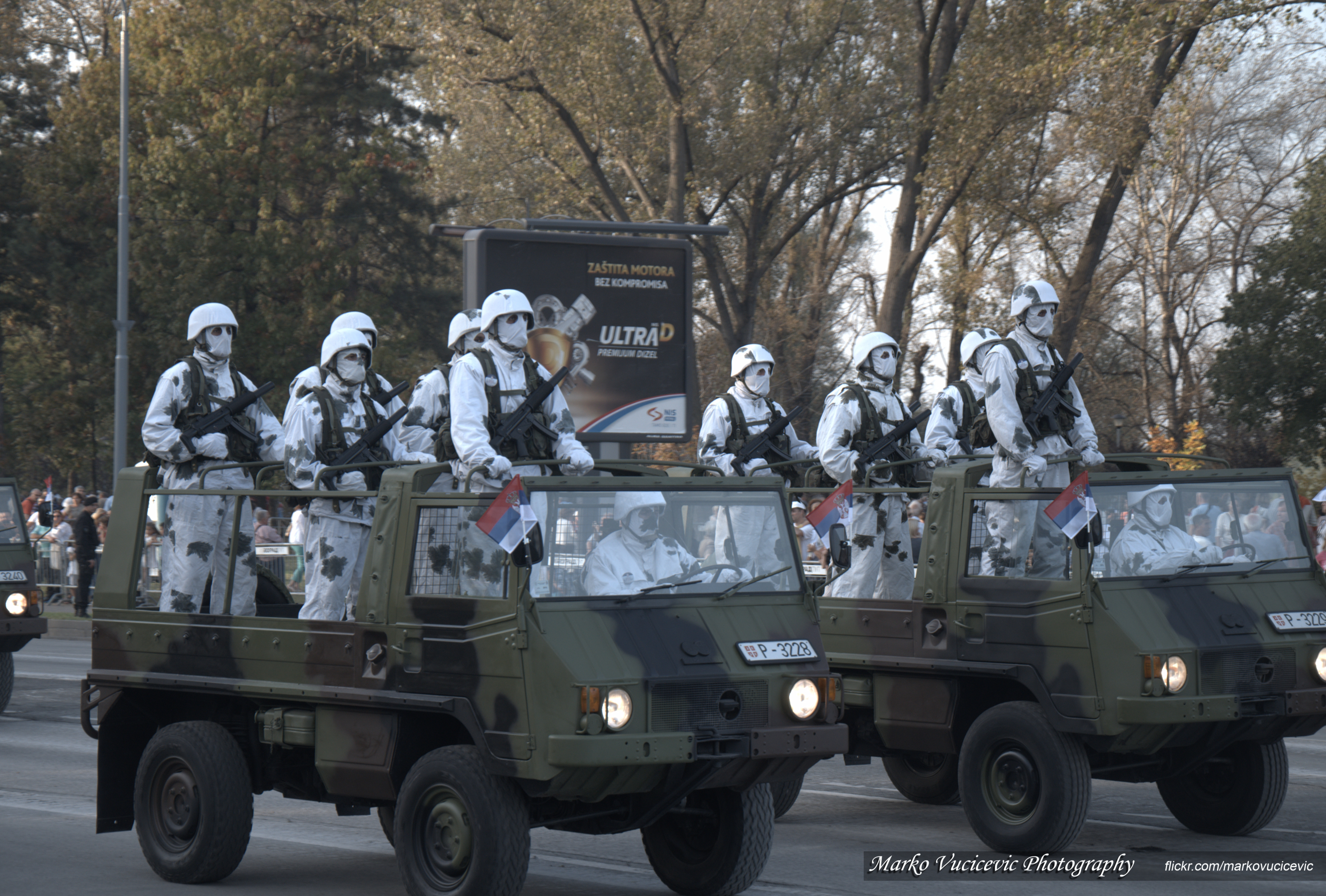
Soldiers in winter camouflage.

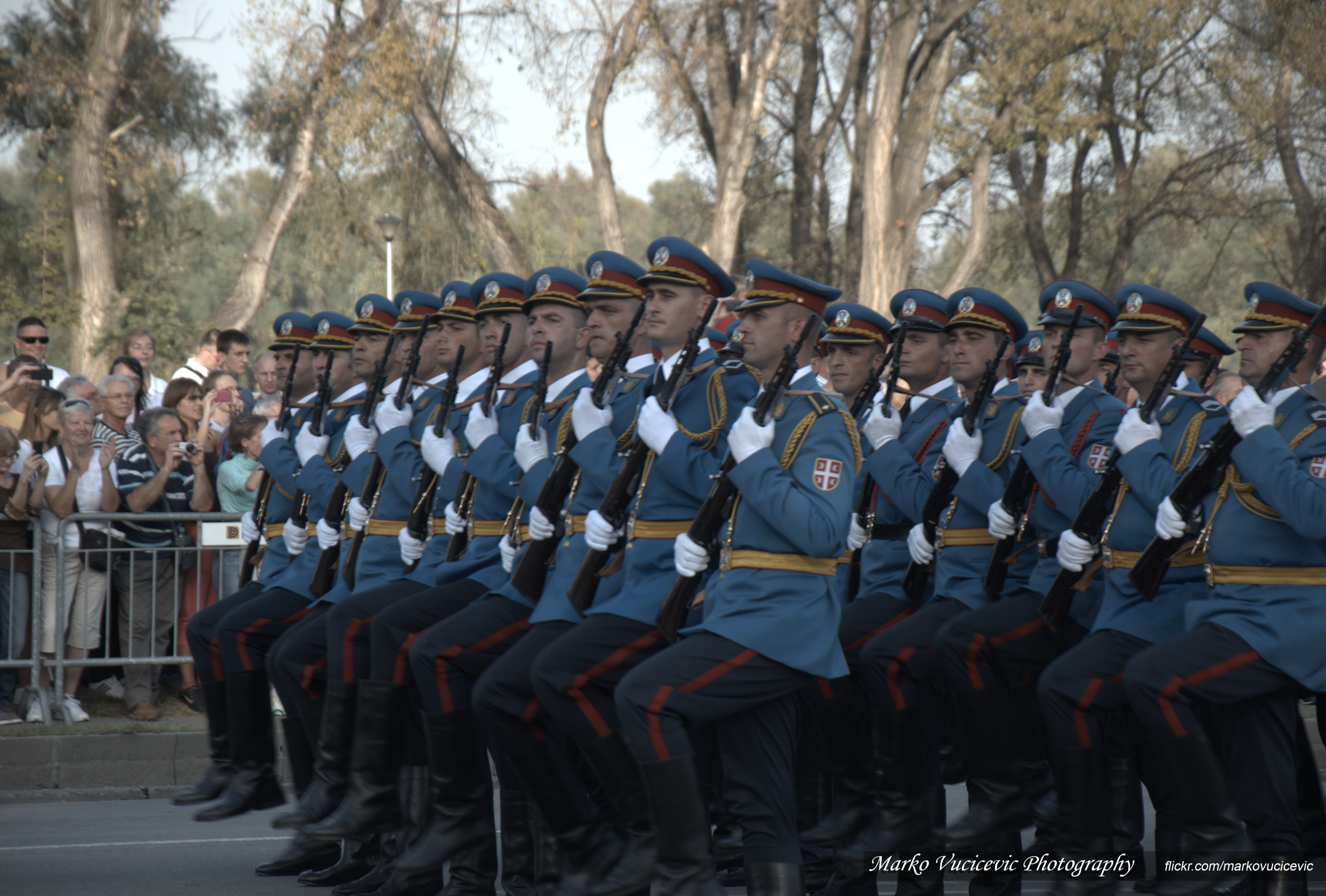
Ceremonial troops (Serbian Guards Unit)

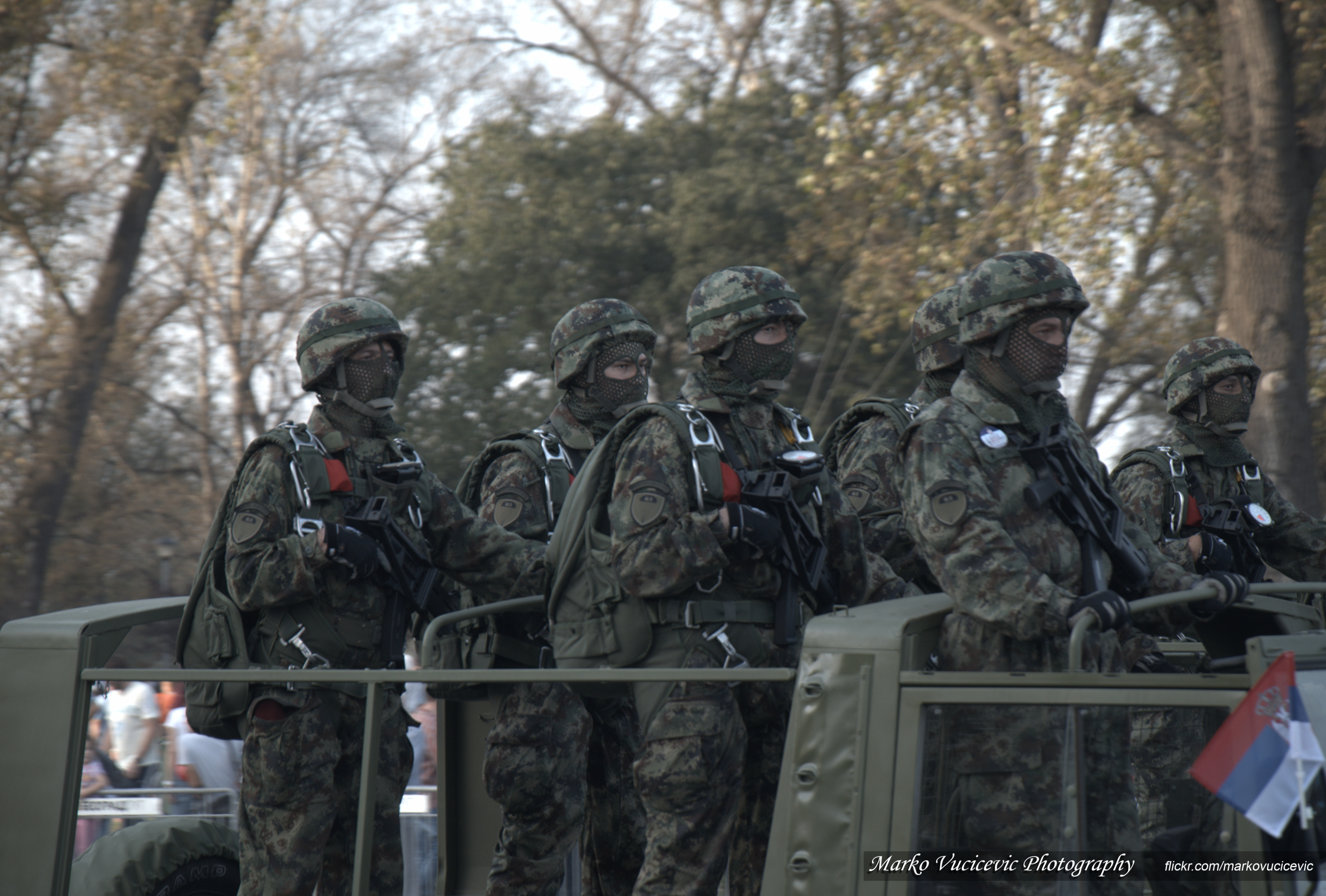
Paratroopers (63rd Parachute Battalion).

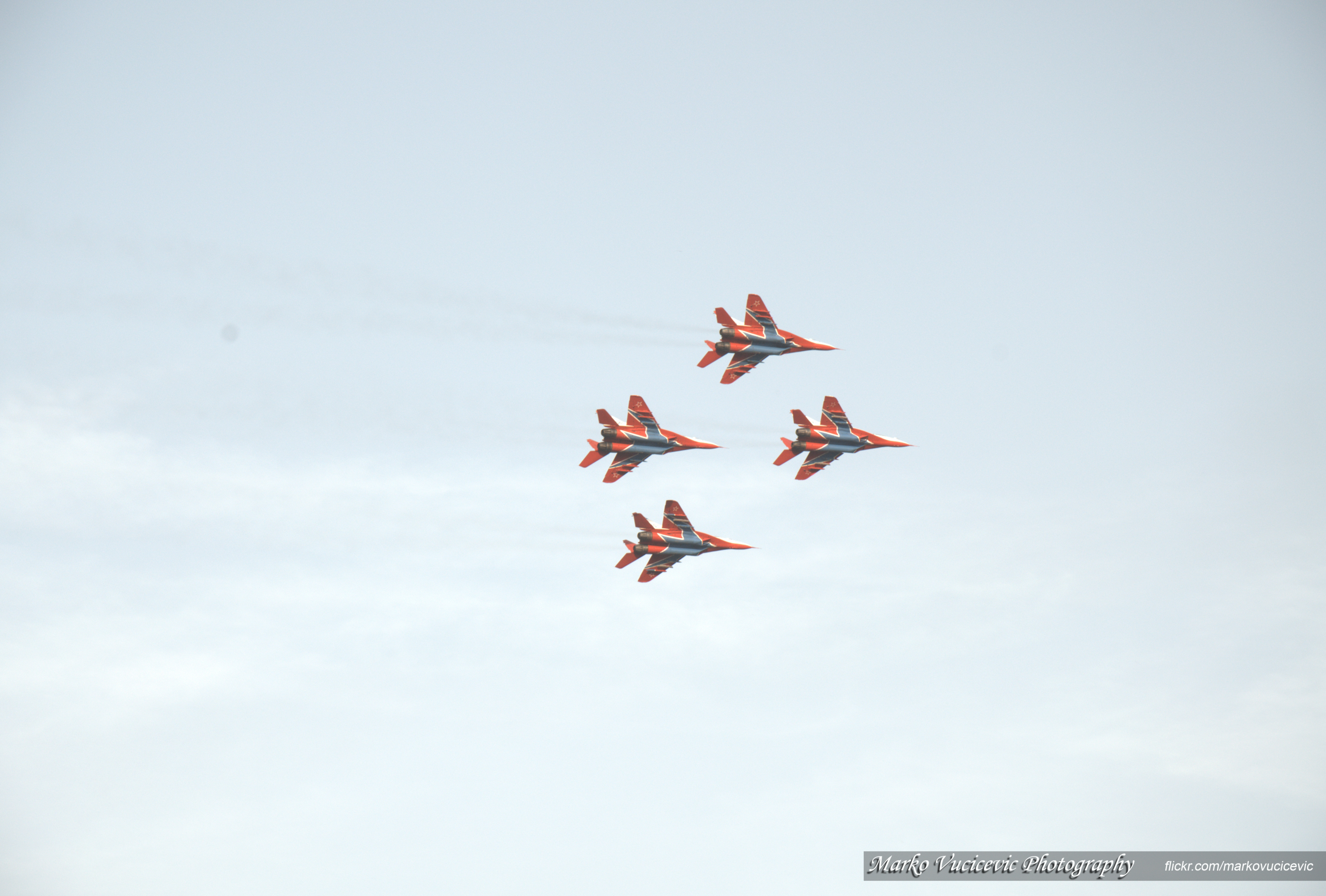
Russian Swifts (aerobatic team) in formation.

== Sources ==
- "Vojna parada – Korak pobednika". Ртс.
