= MAG InnoVision =

Taiwanese manufacturer of visual technologies

MAG InnoVision was a Taiwan-headquartered manufacturer and provider of visual technology, specifically CRT monitors, liquid crystal displays, projectors, plasma displays, and HDTV technology. The company was founded by William Wang when he was 26 years old.

In the early to mid-1990s, its products were one of the top-rated in the market for computer CRT monitors in the North American market, alongside Sony, NEC, and Panasonic. Since the late 1990s and 2000s, these companies have been displaced by ViewSonic, and more recently by Samsung and LG, as the latter were at the forefront of fledgling LCD technology.
