= Partisans Parade =

1944 Red Army parade in Minsk

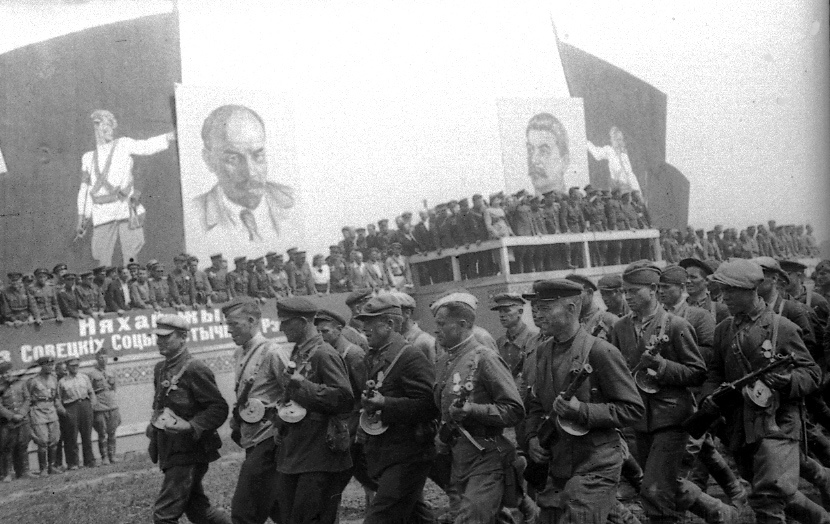
Partisans march past the reviewing stand during the parade

The Partisans Parade (Russian: партизанский парад, Belarusian: Парад партызан) was a solemn Red Army and partisan victory parade held on 16 July 1944 on the field of the former Hippodrome in Minsk on the dedicated to the liberation of Minsk from the German occupation in the 3 July Minsk Offensive. The offensive was part of the Soviet Belorussian Strategic Offensive Operation (codenamed Operation Bagration).

The parade included the participation of 30 partisan brigades totaling around 30,000 partisans in all. It was attended by many different party, government and military officials, including First Secretary of the Communist Party of Byelorussia and Chairman of the Council of Ministers Panteleimon Ponomarenko as wll as Chief of the Partisan Central Headquarters and parade commander Pyotr Kalinin. In the column, the partisans also marched a goat named "Kid", which was decorated with a ribbon with German orders. The parade was the first of its kind in the USSR and was the first victory parade in the country celebrating the country's war victories.

Today, reenactments of the parade are currently held every year on the anniversary by youth unions, university students and reenactment groups. In April 2010 a memorial stone was installed. A sculptural monument in honor of the parade was installed on Minsk's Krasnoarmeyskaya Street near the Svisloch River in 2015.

== See also ==
- 1941 October Revolution Parade
