= Gunnar Lönnqvist =

Finnish photographer and businessman (1891–1978)

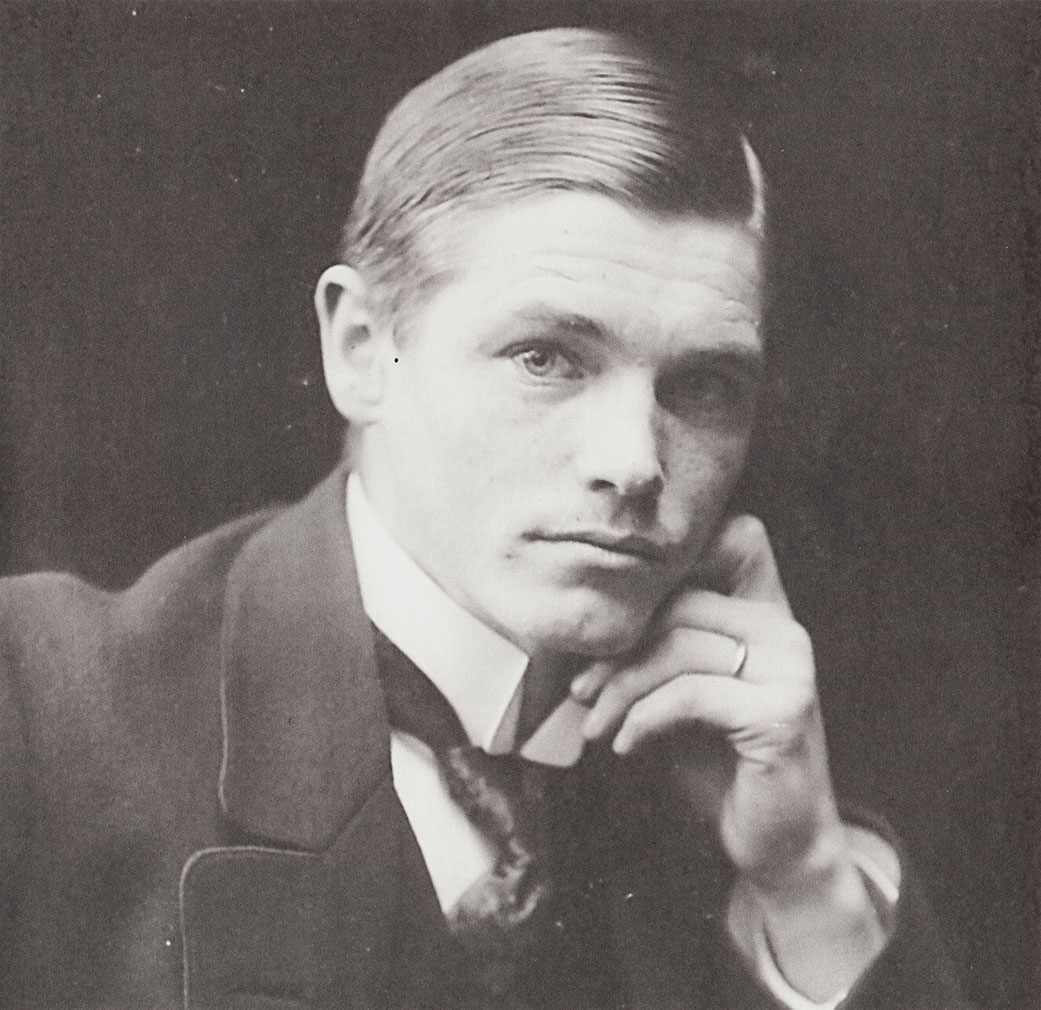
- Lönnqvist in autumn 1914.
- Born: 4 January 1891; Helsinki, Finland
- Died: 26 December 1978 (aged 87); Helsinki, Finland
- Occupations: photographer, businessman
- Spouse: Ida Järvenpää

Arthur Gunnar Lönnqvist (4 January 1891 Helsinki – 26 December 1978 Helsinki) was a Finnish photographer and businessman.

Lönnqvist started his career as an atelier photographer, but soon turned to amateur photography. He photographed his home city Helsinki and the surrounding countryside's landscapes and people. Lönnqvist also photographed in other Finnish cities and during his travels in Europe. He is known especially of photographs taken during the battle of Helsinki in the Finnish Civil War in April 1918. Lönnqvist has won several photography awards in Finland and abroad.

Lönnqvist was involved in amateur photography already as a young man. After he finished school he started working in 1904 at photographer Daniel Nyblin's camera accessories shop Suomen Valokuvaustarvikekauppa (Ab Finska Fotografiska Magasinet in Swedish). Lönnqvist began work as an office clerk, copyist, and photographic assistant, and he also served as the head of the photograph laboratory. In the year 1915, he married Ida Järvenpää (1893–1970). They had 6 children. In 1919, Lönnqvist became the procurator at Suomen Valokuvaustarvikekauppa and later, in the 1920s, he became the company's managing director. In 1933, Lönnqvist founded the company Oy Valovarjo Ab and was engaged as the managing director until the age of 75. The company became the head agency for Kodak-products in Finland.

Beginning from the year 1909, Lönnqvist was actively involved in the Amatörfotografklubben photograph club. He was awarded the club's honorary membership.

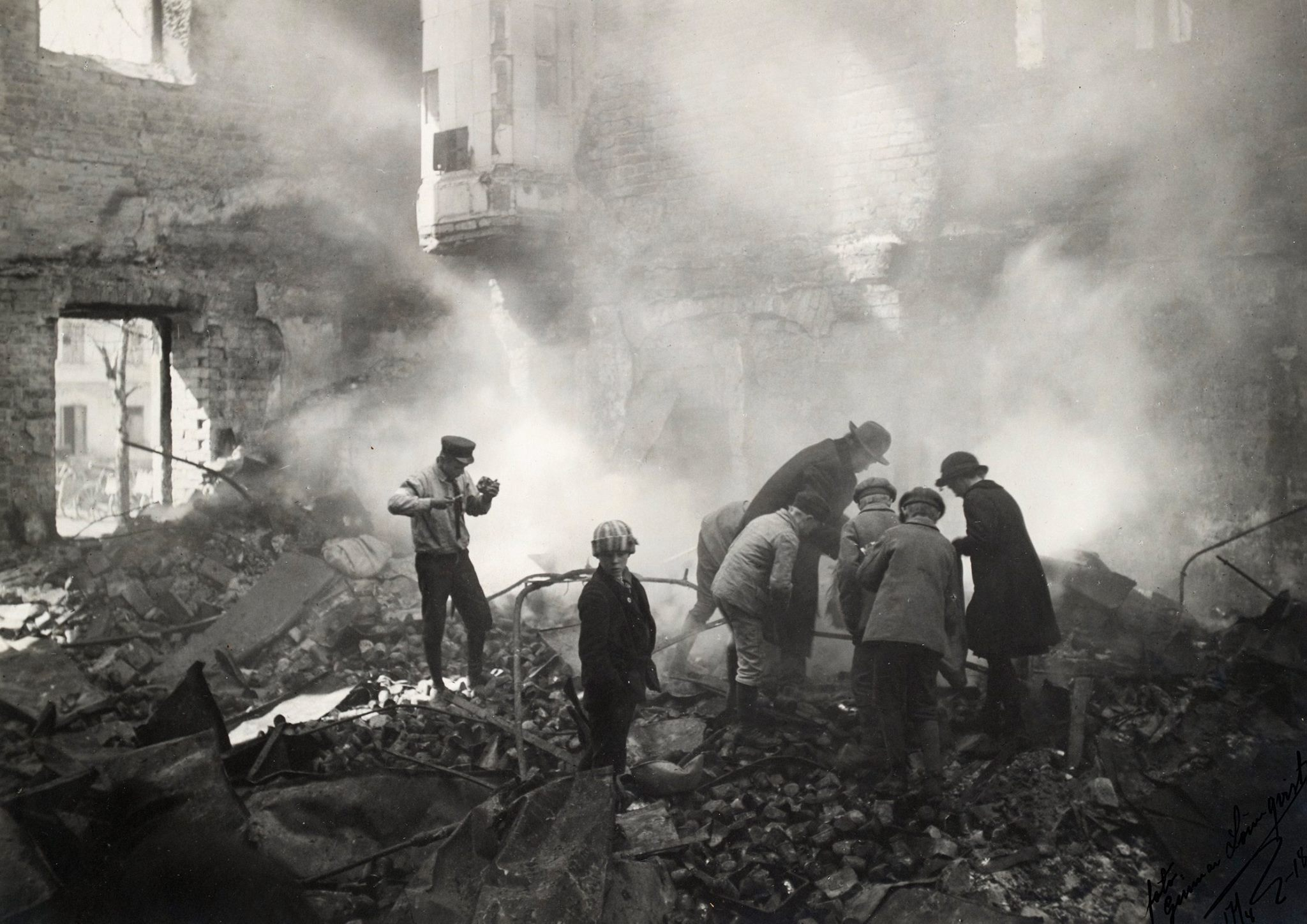
At the ruins of Turku barracks in Helsinki 17.4.1918.

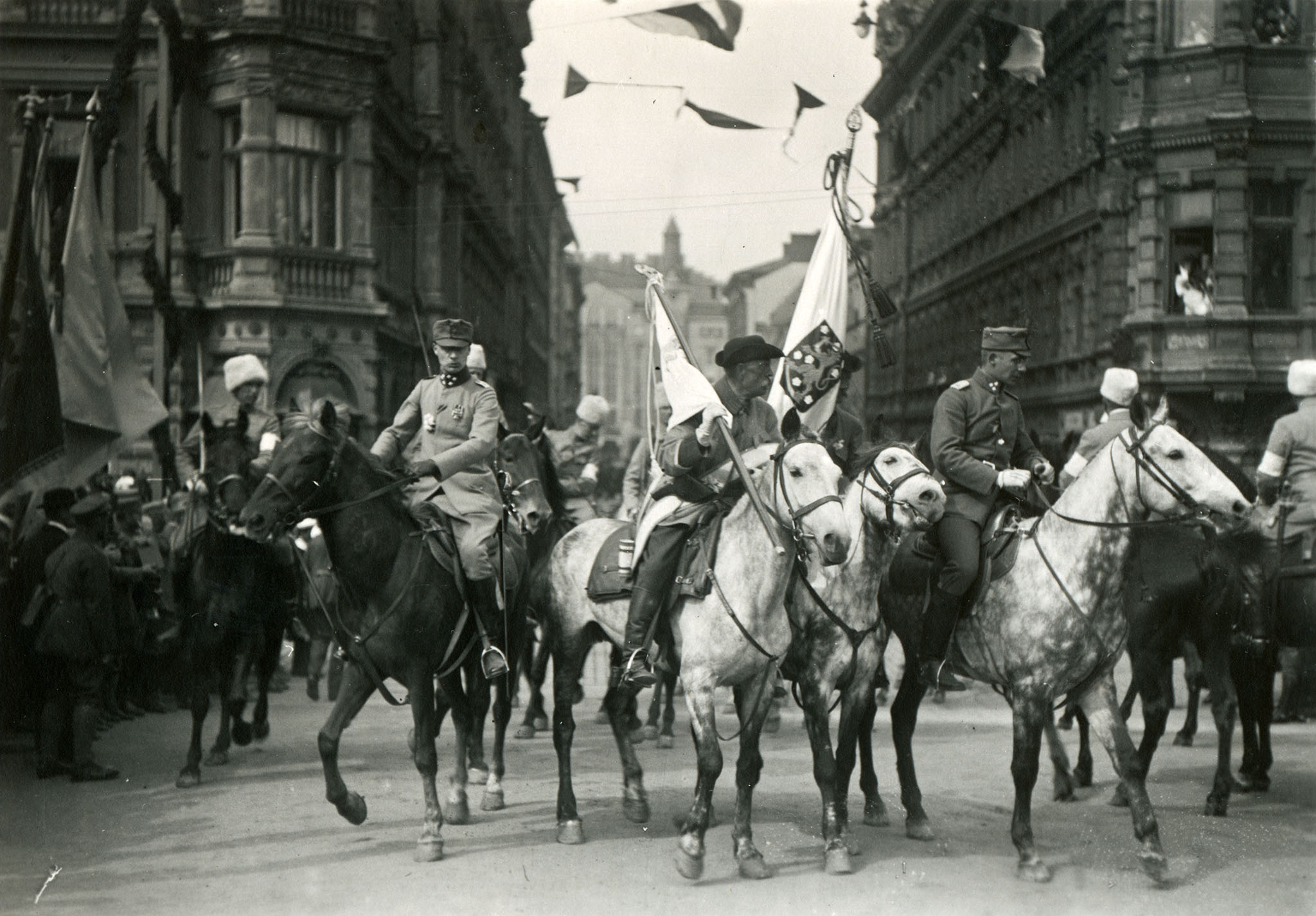
White general staff on a parade at Esplanadi in Helsinki 16.5.1918.

== Bibliography ==
- Feiring, Clas; Gustafsson, Stig (1989). AFK 1889-1989 (in English, Finnish, and Swedish). Helsinki: Amatörfotografklubben i Helsingfors 1989. pp. 10, 18, 26. ISBN 952-90078-5-X.
- Kukkonen, Jukka; Heikka, Elina (2008). Punamustavalkea 1918 kuvat [Redblackwhite 1918 photographs] (in Finnish). Helsinki: The Finnish Museum of Photography. p. 35. ISBN 978-951-9086-74-3.
- Kukkonen, Jukka; Vuorenmaa, Tuomo-Juhani; Hinkka, Jorma (1992). Valokuvan taide - suomalainen valokuva 1842-1982 [The art of photograph - Finnish photograph 1842–1982] (in Finnish). Helsinki: Suomalaisen Kirjallisuuden Seura. p. 451. ISBN 978-951-717-699-6.
- Lintonen, Kati; Rastenberger, Anna-Kaisa; Heikka, Elina (2014). Valokuvataiteen ydin - 1900-luvun suomalaiset valokuvat ja taidepuhe [The core of photographic art – 20th century Finnish photographs and art talk] (in Finnish). Helsinki: Maahenki. pp. 34–39. ISBN 978-952-301-003-1.
- Mäkelä, Asko; Sederholm, Nina (2001). The Memory of the Photograph - Cataloguing & Classification Practices in the Nordic Countries, the Baltic States and Russia. Copenhagen: Nordic Council of Ministers. p. 154. ISBN 92-893-0628-9.
- Nyblin, Ragnar (1927). A.B. Finska Fotografiska Magasinet F. D. Daniel Nyblin 18 7/7 77 – 19 7/7 27 (in Swedish). Helsinki: Osakeyhtiö Weilin & Göös Aktiebolag. pp. 19–20.
- Nyblin, Ragnar (1927). O.Y. Suomen Valokuvaustarpeiden Kauppa ent. Daniel Nyblin 18 7/7 77 – 19 7/7 27 (in Finnish). Helsinki: Osakeyhtiö Weilin & Göös Aktiebolag. pp. 19–20.
- Toimituskunta A. Uusikylä; et al. (1929). Valoa ja varjoa – suomalaisia valokuvia [Light and shadow – Finnish photographs] (in Finnish). Porvoo: Werner Söderström osakeyhtiö. p. 10.
