= Commemoration Day of Fallen Soldiers =

Commemoration in Finland for soldiers

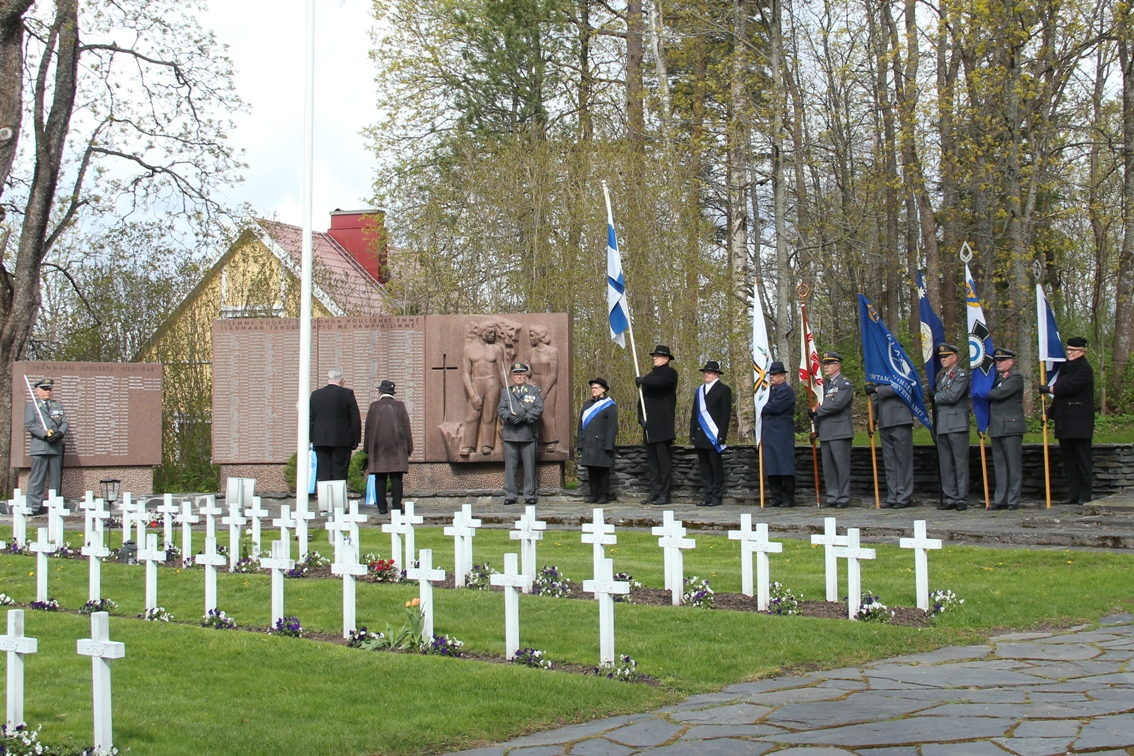
- Commemoration Day of Fallen Soldiers in Vihti in 2020.
- Observed by: Finland
- Date: Third Sunday in May
- 2024 date: May 19
- 2025 date: May 18
- 2026 date: May 17
- 2027 date: May 16
- Frequency: annual

Commemoration Day of Fallen Soldiers (Finnish: kaatuneitten muistopäivä, Swedish: de stupades dag) is the commemoration day observed in Finland on the third Sunday of May for the soldiers killed in the Winter War and Finnish Civil War 1918. After 1940 it was also the day of commemoration of the soldiers killed in the Continuation War and the Lapland War. There were also members of Lotta Svärd, who also were victims of war serving in uniforms on the front. Nowadays the day also commemorates Finnish soldiers killed in United Nations peacekeeping missions.

The idea of the day was raised in the bishops' meeting in April 1940. They made a proposal of the day on 19 May. Carl Gustaf Emil Mannerheim as the war time supreme commander, ordered on 1 May 1940, not to celebrate 16 May 1940 as the victory of the Senate of Finland in the Finnish Civil War, but to have a Commemoration Day of Fallen Soldiers for soldiers of both sides of the war and also the Winter War.

The day is a religious one, which includes remembering dead soldiers in the local grave yards after church services.

== See also ==
- Memorial Day – Federal holiday in the United States
- Remembrance Day – Day honouring military casualties of war
- Volkstrauertag – Annual day of mourning in Germany
