= Gösta Theslöf =

Finnish Army officer (1872–1939)

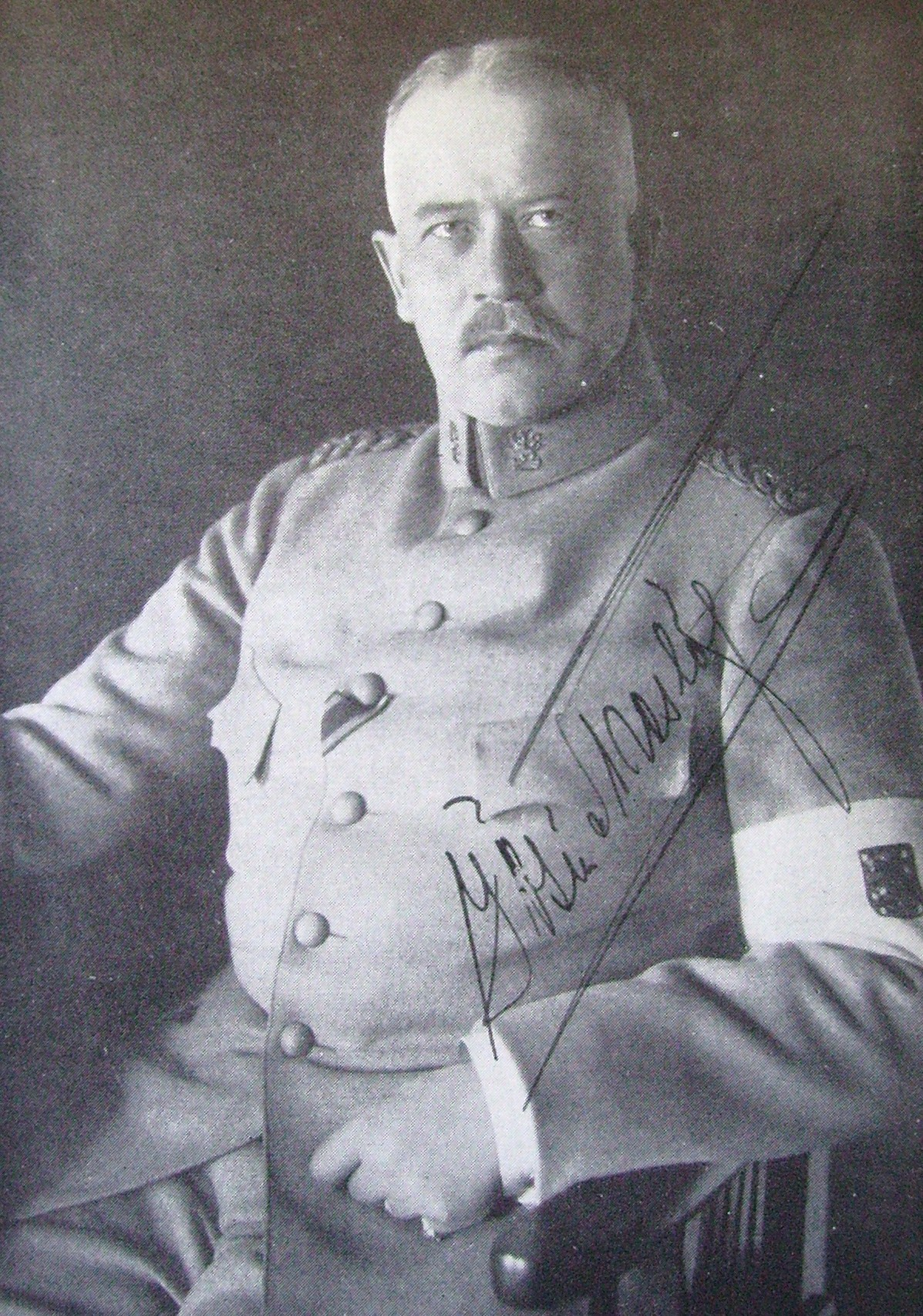

Personal details
- Born: April 26, 1872 Muhos, Grand Duchy of Finland, Russian Empire
- Died: March 28, 1939 (aged 66) Ekenäs, Finland

Military service
- Branch/service: Imperial Russian Army (1892–1902); Finnish Defence Forces (1918–1919)
- Years of service: 1885–1919

Carl Gustaf Theslöf (1872–1939), called Gösta Theslöf, was a Finnish Army officer and independence acitivist.

== Biography ==
Theslöf attended the Hamina Cadet School from 1885 to 1892 before being commissioned as an officer of the Imperial Russian Army. He was stationed in Moscow from 1893 to 1896.

In 1900, Theslöf began training as a physical education teacher at the University of Helsinki In 1901, he graduated with a degree in Russian literature and was hired as a Russian language teacher at the Hamina Cadet School. Later that year, the semi-independent military of the Grand Duchy of Finland was disbanded as part of the policy of Russification. As a move intended to undermine Finnish sovereignty, this turned Theslöf's attitude toward Russia fully hostile. When the Hamina Cadet School was shut down in 1902, Theslöf resigned from the Army.

In the following years, Theslöf established contacts with activists who were planning an armed revolt against Russian rule of Finland. In 1904, during the Russo-Japanese War, he and Jonas Castrén offered the support of the Finnish independence movement to Col. Akashi Motojirō, spymaster for the Daihon'ei in Europe.

Theslöf advocated for Finland’s active participation in the Russian Civil War. When anti-communist C. G. Mannerheim lost the 1919 Finnish presidential election, Theslöf realized that a Finnish invasion of Russia would not take place, and in disappointment he resigned from the Army once again. He retired to his house in Ekenäs, devoting himself to gardening until his death in 1939.
