= Planned 2018 Washington Veterans Day Parade =

Canceled military parade

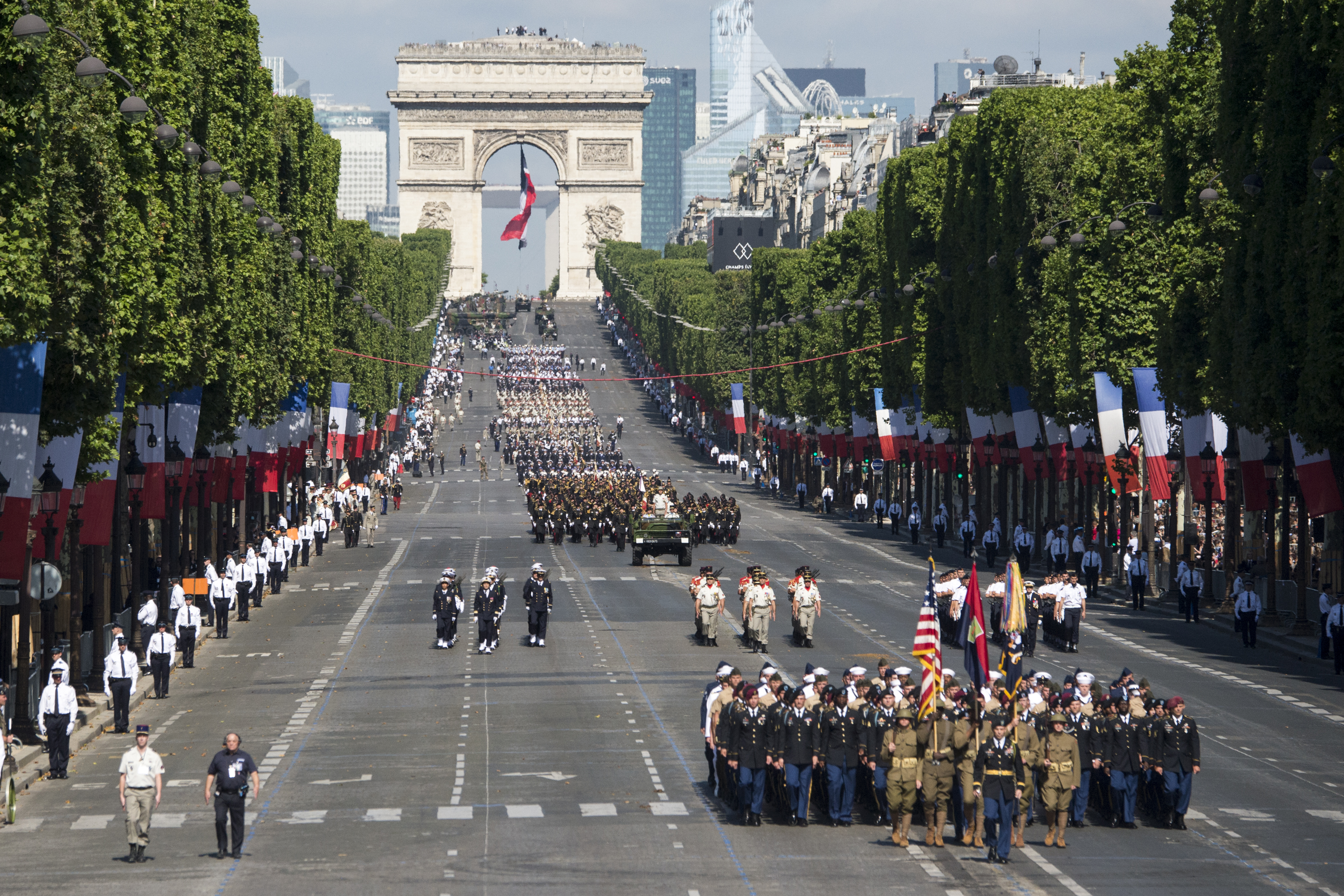
The inspiration for a military parade in the United States was based in part to Trump's attendance at the 2017 Bastille Day military parade (seen here).

The 2018 Washington Veterans Day Parade (colloquially called "Trump's military parade") was a planned military parade that would have taken place in Washington, D.C., on November 10, 2018, in honor of the Veterans Day holiday (which took place on 11 November). On August 16, 2018, it was announced that the military parade would be postponed until 2019. In canceling the parade for 2018, President Donald Trump cited the projected high costs for the parade, which he blamed on D.C. city officials.

== Background ==
The parade was expected to include members of all five armed services; the Army, Navy, Air Force, Marine Corps and the Coast Guard, with other units that were to be dressed in period uniforms representing earlier times in the United States military history. A memo from General Joseph Dunford reported that the parade was to have focused on historic battles and conflicts such as the Revolutionary War and the War of 1812. Between 5,000 and 7,000 service members were to have taken part in the parade, which was to begin at the U.S. Capitol and end at the White House. The evolution of women in the service was also to be highlighted in the parade, along with an emphasis on the price of freedom. The parade would have included 100 wheeled vehicles instead of tanks, as well as a heavy air component featuring 50 aircraft at the end of the parade. U.S. President Donald Trump would have been situated in a reviewing area and surrounded by military heroes. Medal of Honor recipients would have been included in reviewing the parade with the President and would have marched in the parade.

The parade would also have coincided with the 100th anniversary of the end of World War I. It was to have been the first full scale parade in the nation's capital since 1991 involving the men and women of the active and reserve components of the United States Armed Forces and veterans' organizations and the first national Veterans' Day parade in years. U.S. President Donald Trump requested the military parade following his admiration of the Bastille Day military parade at the Champs-Élysées in Paris which he attended in 2017.

=== Cancellation of 2018 parade ===
On August 17, 2018, U.S. President Donald Trump stated that he canceled the parade due to the "ridiculous" $92 million price tag. Through Twitter he blamed local politicians for the price and suggested hosting another parade in 2019, and ended his tweets with; "Maybe we will do something next year in D.C. when the cost comes WAY DOWN. Now we can buy some more jet fighters!"

In spite of Trump's statements, Budget Director Mick Mulvaney claimed that the cancellation was not just for reasons of cost.

After the parade was canceled, Trump confirmed that he would instead "go to the Paris parade" on November 11, referring to the commemorations there marking the anniversary of the end of World War I.

== Cost ==
A Pentagon official estimated the cost of the parade between $3 million and $50 million, earlier in 2018. Another suggestion of the cost was closer to $92 million, with at least $50 million being used to cover Pentagon costs for aircraft, equipment, personnel, and other support. This number was refuted by Defense Secretary Jim Mattis who stated; "I'm not dignifying that number ($92 million) with a reply." The $92 million estimate was to be divided between the Defense Department and the Department of Homeland Security, which would have contributed $50 million and $42 million respectively.

Separately DC City officials estimated expenses related to the parade would have been $21.6 million with an expectation for reimbursement from the Federal government, with the Mayor of Washington, D.C., Muriel Bowser reporting that $13 million would have been used alone to cover police costs.

== Opinion of parade ==
=== Support ===
In February 2017, very few lawmakers backed the idea of a military parade. Senator David Perdue, a Republican of Georgia, told reporters "He's the President of the United States. Personally, I would prefer not to do it. But he's the president." Senator Lindsey Graham, a Republican of South Carolina, supported the parade if it honored the military itself, and not the "...Soviet-style hardware display."

AMVETS, a group that advocates for military veterans, felt that potentially the parade would inspire more Americans to join the armed forces.

=== Against ===
Other politicians spoke out against the parade. Representative Adam Smith, a Democrat of Washington and members of the House Armed Services Committee released a statement that highlighted "A military parade like this - one that is unduly focused on a single person - is what authoritarian regimes do, not democracies." Senator John Kennedy, a Republican of Louisiana, told reporters "We're not North Korea, we're not Russia, and we're not China and I don't want to be", while speaking out against the proposed parade.

== See also ==
- Grand Review of the Armies
- National Victory Celebration
- New York at War
- New York City Victory Parade of 1946
- Salute to America
- US Army 250th Anniversary Parade
- Veterans Day Parade (New York City)
