= 1945 British victory parade in Berlin =

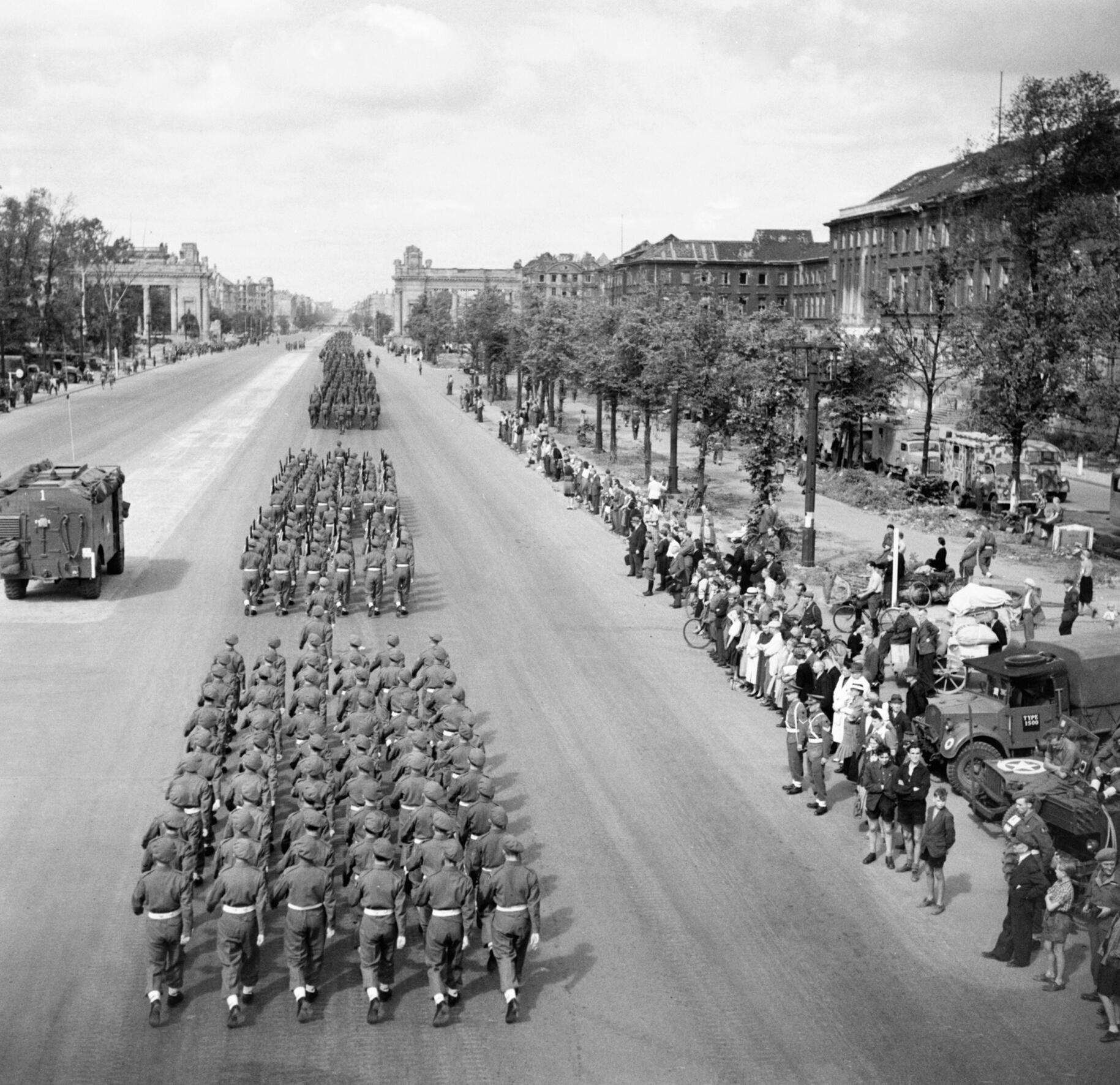
British troops march down the Charlottenburger Chaussee in Berlin.

The 1945 British victory parade in Berlin was a military parade held by the British Army on 21 July 1945 in Berlin, the capital of the then-defeated Germany. It took place on Charlottenburger Chaussee, which is west of Brandenburg Gate. The parade took place a month after the Moscow Victory Parade of 1945 and over six weeks before the Berlin Victory Parade. It was attended by Winston Churchill in his position as Prime Minister of the United Kingdom and Field Marshal Bernard Montgomery, Commander-in-Chief of the 21st Army Group. Clement Attlee, who was Leader of the Labour Party at the time and succeeded Churchill 5 days later, also attended. The parade occurred during the Potsdam Conference which had begun 4 days earlier with the participation of Churchill, Soviet General Secretary Joseph Stalin and President Harry S. Truman.

10,000 troops of the British Army took part in the event. Attendees also included Henry H. Arnold and George Marshall, both five-star Generals.

== See also ==
- Moscow Victory Parade of 1945
- London Victory Celebrations of 1946
- New York City Victory Parade of 1946
