= National Victory Celebration =

Public event celebrating the end of the Gulf War

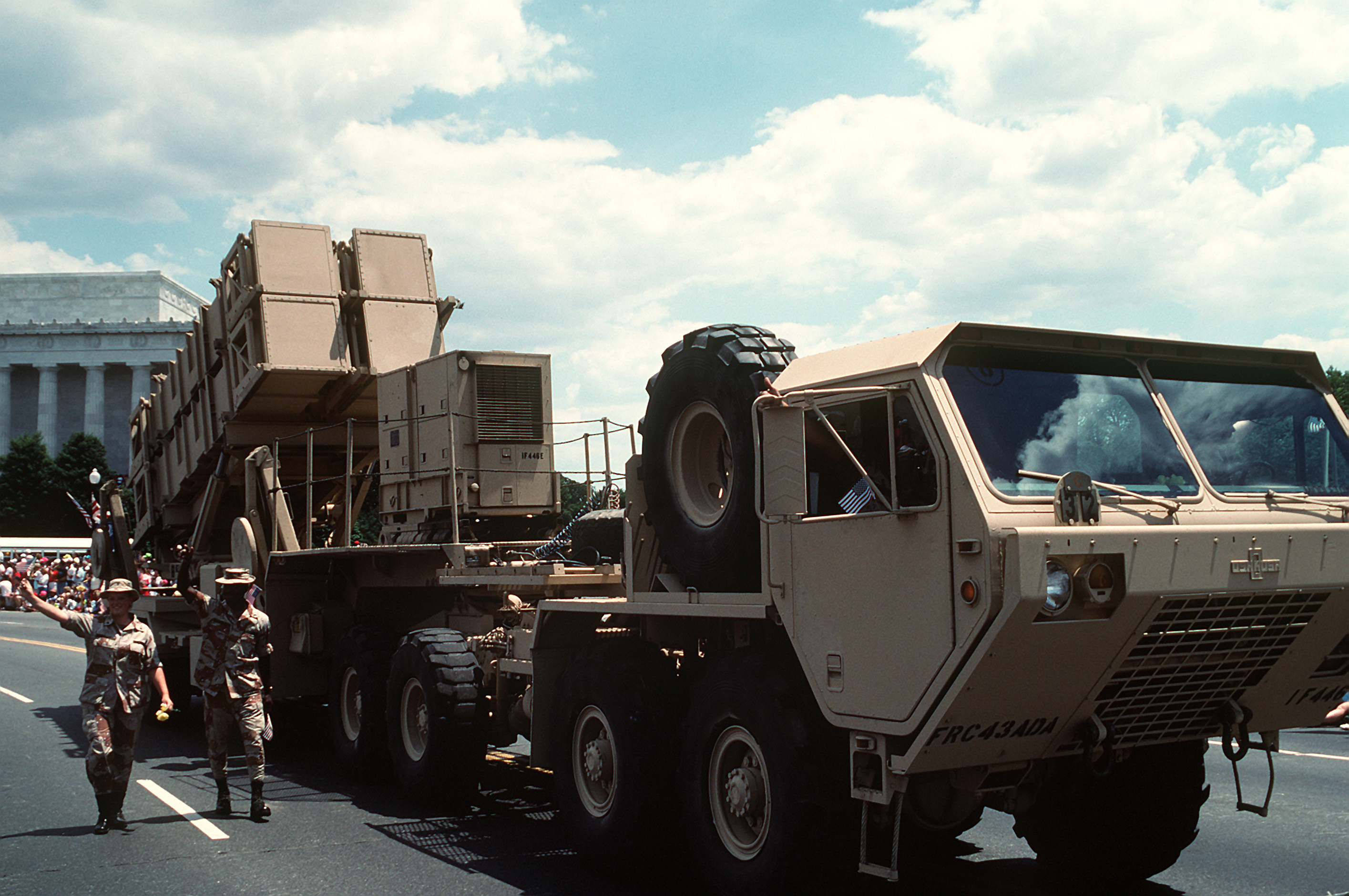
A MIM-104 Patriot tactical air defense missile system is towed by a heavy expanded mobility tactical truck in the National Victory Celebration.

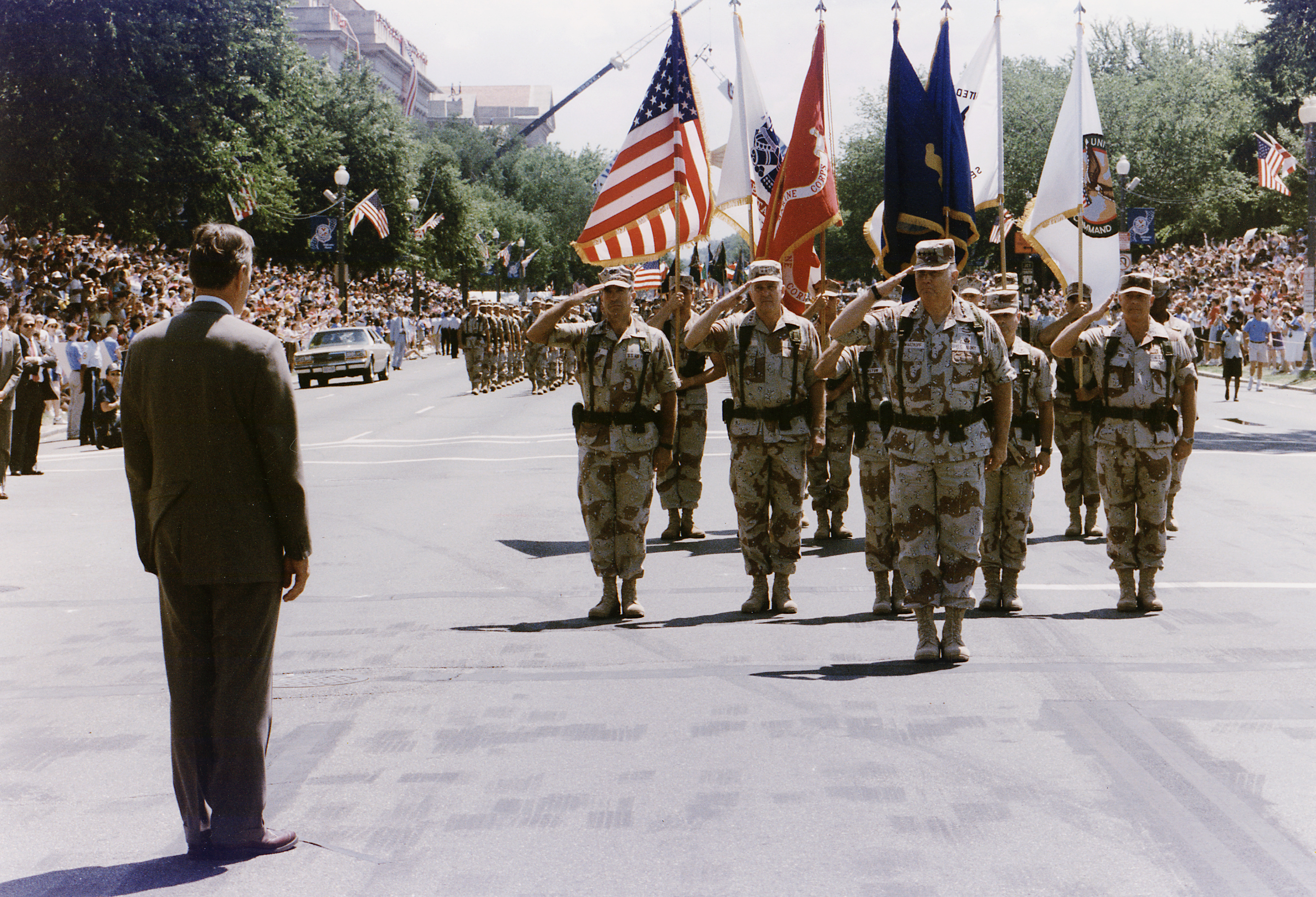
President George H. W. Bush greeting General Norman Schwarzkopf Jr. on the parade route.

The National Victory Celebration was held in Washington, D.C., United States, on June 8, 1991, to celebrate the conclusion of the Gulf War. It was the largest American military parade since World War II. Eight thousand Desert Storm troops marched in the national parade. A small group of Vietnam veterans also took part in the parade. General Norman Schwarzkopf Jr., the commander of the Desert Storm forces, led the parade. The parade took place on Constitution Avenue, Pennsylvania Avenue, and across the Memorial Bridge. The elaborate parade, which cost $12 million and was partly financed by Saudi Arabia and Kuwait, was criticized by opponents of its militarism.

The itinerary included a wreath laying by President George H.W. Bush at the Tomb of the Unknown Soldier in Arlington National Cemetery and a memorial service commemorating approximately 400 war dead. The parade route was 2.5 miles (4.0 km) long, crossing the Potomac River. A United Service Organization event and fireworks display followed. A ticker-tape parade was subsequently held in New York City on June 10.

The celebration on June 8 helped to set a single day Metrorail record of 786,358 trips, breaking the record of approximately 604,000 trips set during the inauguration of George H. W. Bush in 1989. June 7 also set a weekday ridership record of 577,800 trips. The June 8 single-day record would last until the first inauguration of Bill Clinton in 1993. June 8 also set a Saturday ridership record which would last 17 years until it was broken in 2010 by the Rally to Restore Sanity and/or Fear.

== See also ==
- New York at War, 1942 mobilization parade
- New York City Victory Parade of 1946
- Grand Review of the Armies
- US Army 250th Anniversary Parade
