= Veterans Day Parade (New York City) =

Annual parade

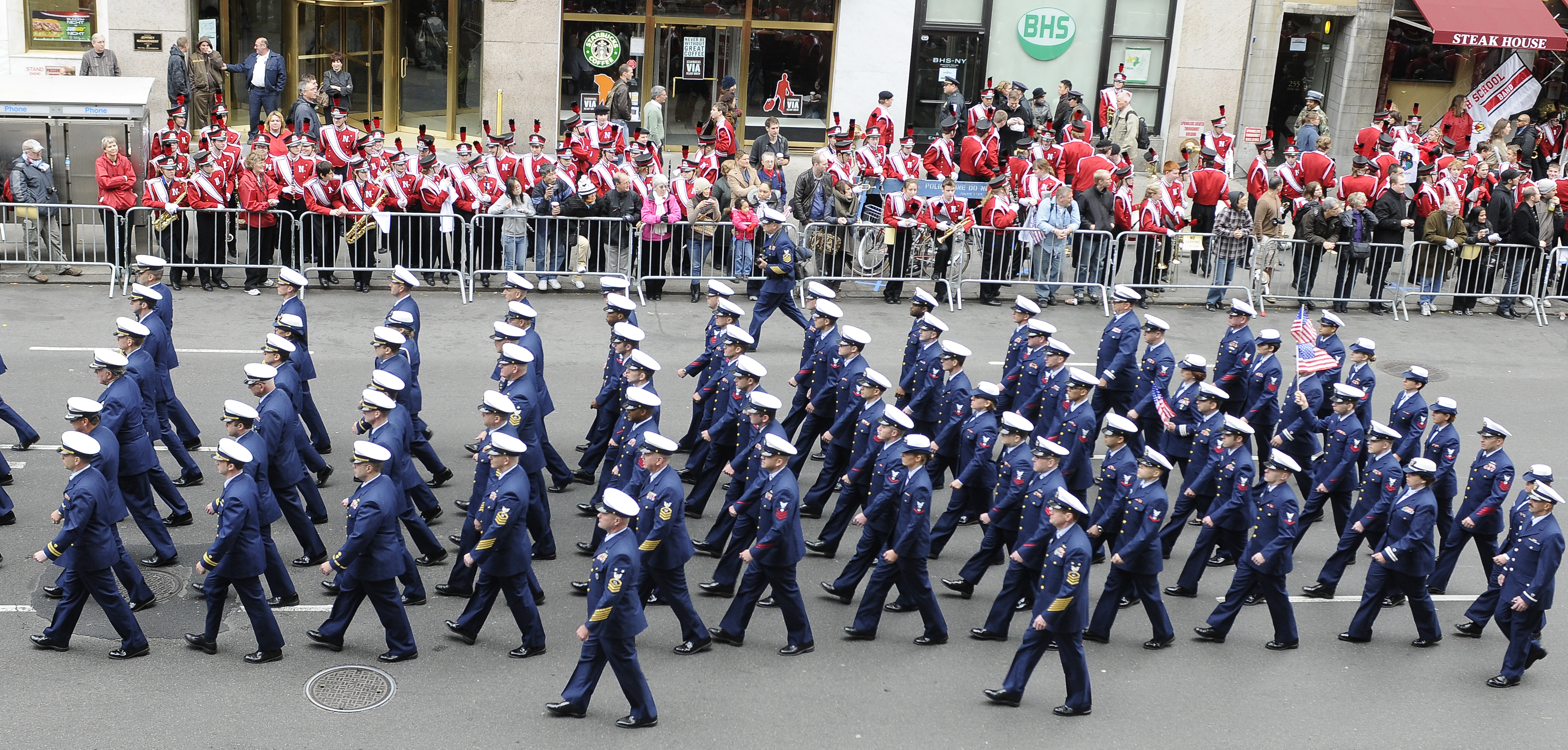
- The parade in 2009
- Status: Active
- Genre: Parade
- Begins: 11:15 a.m.
- Ends: 3:30 p.m.
- Frequency: Yearly on Veterans Day
- Venue: Fifth Avenue
- Locations: Manhattan, New York City, New York
- Country: United States
- Participants: Approximately 20,000
- Leader: United War Veterans Council (UWVC)
- Sponsor: Various entities
- Website: parade.uwvc.org

The Veterans Day Parade is an annual parade produced by the United War Veterans Council (UWVC) in New York City. It is the largest Veterans Day event in the United States of America.

The event, which is held in the New York City borough of Manhattan honoring living U.S. servicemen and women, begins just after 11 a.m. EST on Veterans Day. The Veterans Day Parade begins on Fifth Avenue at 23rd Street, and continues north along Fifth Avenue to 52nd Street.

== Overview ==
The Veterans Day Parade in New York has been in existence since 1919. The parade draws over 20,000 participants and 400,000 spectators each year, making it the largest Veterans Day event in the nation.

The Veterans Day commemoration begins with a wreath-laying ceremony one hour prior to the start of the parade at the Eternal Light Flagstaff in Madison Square Park.

The celebrations are aired live on ABC's flagship NYC station, WABC-TV, and is streamed live on its official Facebook fanpage.

== History ==
=== 2011 parade ===
The parade took place on November 11, 2011, commemorating the 10th anniversary of the attacks of September 11, 2001. The 2011 parade included 27 active military units from all branches, six Medal of Honor recipients, veterans groups and high school bands from around the nation.

=== 2012 parade ===
Late New York City Mayor Ed Koch served as grand marshal of the 2012 parade. Also, there was a train crash that resulted in 4 fatalities and injured 16 people.

=== 2013 parade ===
Retired General Officer Ann Dunwoody, the first-ever female Four Star general in the U.S. Army, served as grand marshal, in honor of Dunwoody's near-four decades worth of dedicated military service.

=== 2014 parade ===
Former New York City police commissioner Ray Kelly was the grand marshal for the 95th edition of the parade. Kelly was bestowed the honor in recognition of his time in the Marines, as well as Kelly's 13 years as police commissioner in two separate appointments (1992–1994 and 2002–2013), under mayors David Dinkins and Michael Bloomberg, respectively.

=== 2015 parade ===
Robert M. Morgenthau, the former Manhattan district attorney; United States attorney for the Southern District of New York, as well as Navy veteran, served as the parade's grand marshal.

=== 2019 parade ===
President Donald Trump took part in the parade, being the first President of the United States to attend the parade, which commemorated in 100th anniversary since its inception.

=== 2020 parade ===
In combatting the COVID-19 pandemic, there was an early-morning procession of 100 vehicles, with strict measures such as social distancing & wearing masks by veterans. No crowds were present. Organizers presented a live broadcast on WABC, as well as a virtual parade on social media, a motorcycle ride on Fifth Avenue, and a socially distanced ruck march around the monuments of Lower Manhattan.

== Participants ==
There are a variety of marchers, floats and marching bands in the Veterans Day Parade. Participants include active officers, various veterans groups, junior ROTC members, and the families of veterans.

== See also ==
- 2018 Washington Veterans Day Parade
- Armed Forces Day Parade (Bremerton)
