= United States Army 250th Anniversary Parade =

Military parade in Washington, D.C.

- Part of United States Semiquincentennial celebrations
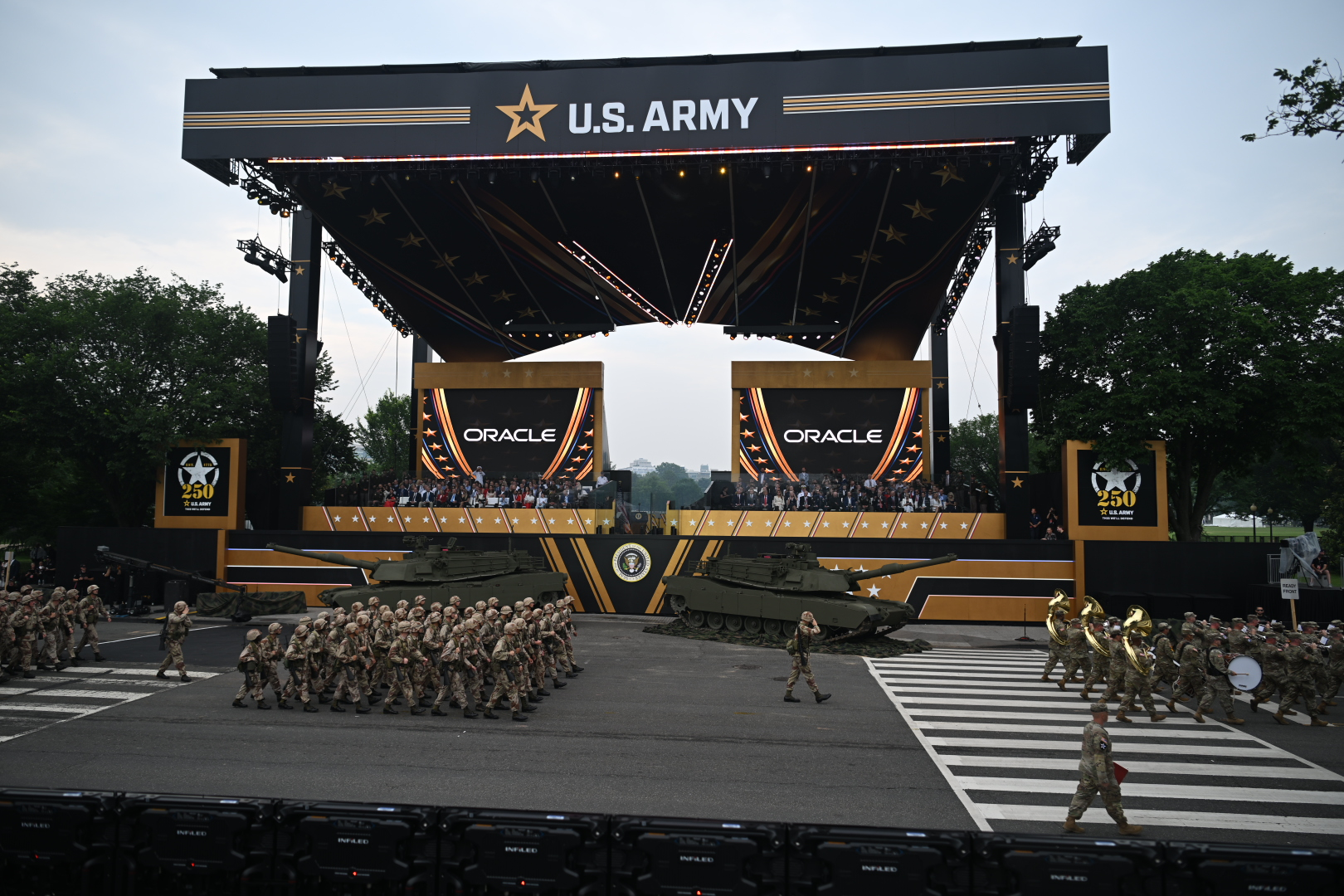
- U.S. Army Soldiers participate in the Army's 250th Birthday Parade in Washington, D.C., June 14, 2025; M1 Abrams battle tanks and Oracle sponsoring in the background
- Date: June 14, 2025; 17 months ago
- Time: 6:30 p.m. planned, actual 6:00 p.m. to avoid rain (EDT)
- Duration: 90 minutes
- Location: from The Pentagon, Virginia, to the National Mall, Washington, D.C.
- Budget: $25–$45 million
- Participants: Donald Trump, President of the United States; Melania Trump, First Lady of the United States; Pete Hegseth, United States Secretary of Defense; Marco Rubio, United States Secretary of State; General Randy George, Chief of Staff of the United States Army

The 250th Birthday of the U.S. Army Grand Military Parade and Celebration took place on June 14, 2025, in Arlington, Virginia, and Washington, D.C., to officially commemorate the 250th anniversary of the United States Army on June 14, 1775, the oldest of the six branches of the United States Armed Forces. It is part of the celebrations marking the United States Semiquincentennial, the 250th anniversary of the nation's founding and described as a "soft launch" of official celebrations.

The parade coincided with both the 79th birthday of Donald Trump, the 45th and 47th president of the United States, and Flag Day. It was the first military parade in Washington D.C. since the 1991 National Victory Celebration held by President George H.W. Bush, which commemorated U.S. soldiers in the involvement and conclusion of the Gulf War.

The parade involved around 6,600 soldiers from at least 11 corps and divisions nationwide, with at least 150 vehicles, 50 helicopters, warplanes, horses, mules, parachutists, celebrities, seven bands' musical performances, and several thousand civilian attendees.

The parade faced bipartisan criticism due to its high projected cost, estimated at between $25 and $45 million, especially as it coincided with broader government cost-cutting measures. Additional controversy arose from its timing on Trump's birthday, which critics argued politicized the military and drew comparisons to displays typically seen in authoritarian regimes. The idea for the parade originated during Trump's first term, when a similar proposal was rejected by the Pentagon over concerns that it would appear overly political. Millions of demonstrators attended nationwide protests against the parade and Trump's policies on the same day in the largest coordinated protests since the start of the second Trump administration.

== Background ==
=== First-term parade plans ===
During his first presidential term, Donald Trump had advocated for a military parade on Veterans Day in 2018. Trump espoused this desire after watching France's Bastille Day celebrations in 2017.

The idea was opposed by Pentagon officials who said they wanted to keep the military out of politics. Defense secretary Jim Mattis reportedly told Trump he would "rather swallow acid" than have the parade, while Gen. Paul J. Selva remarked that military parades were "what dictators do". Trump canceled the 2018 parade, citing projected costs, but directed the 2019 Salute to America Independence Day event at the National Mall. Trump again brought up the idea for a parade in 2020 with Mattis's successor, Mark T. Esper, who suggested an "air parade" to coincide with July 4. The Trump administration ultimately organized the 2020 Mount Rushmore Fireworks Celebration and 2020 Salute to America as part of Independence Day celebrations.

=== Planning and preparations ===
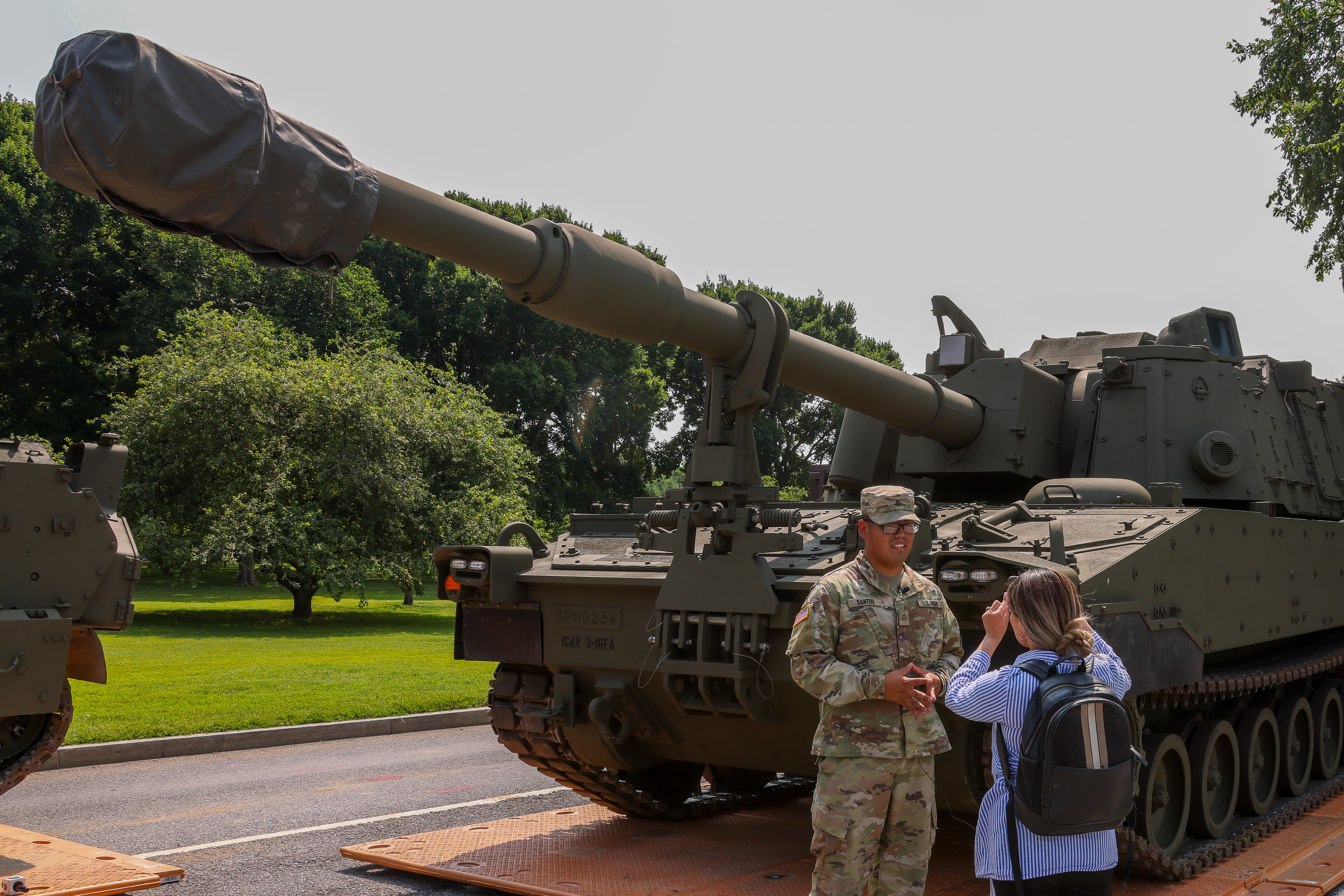
An Army soldier speaking during a media opportunity, with an M109A7 Paladin prepared in DC before the parade

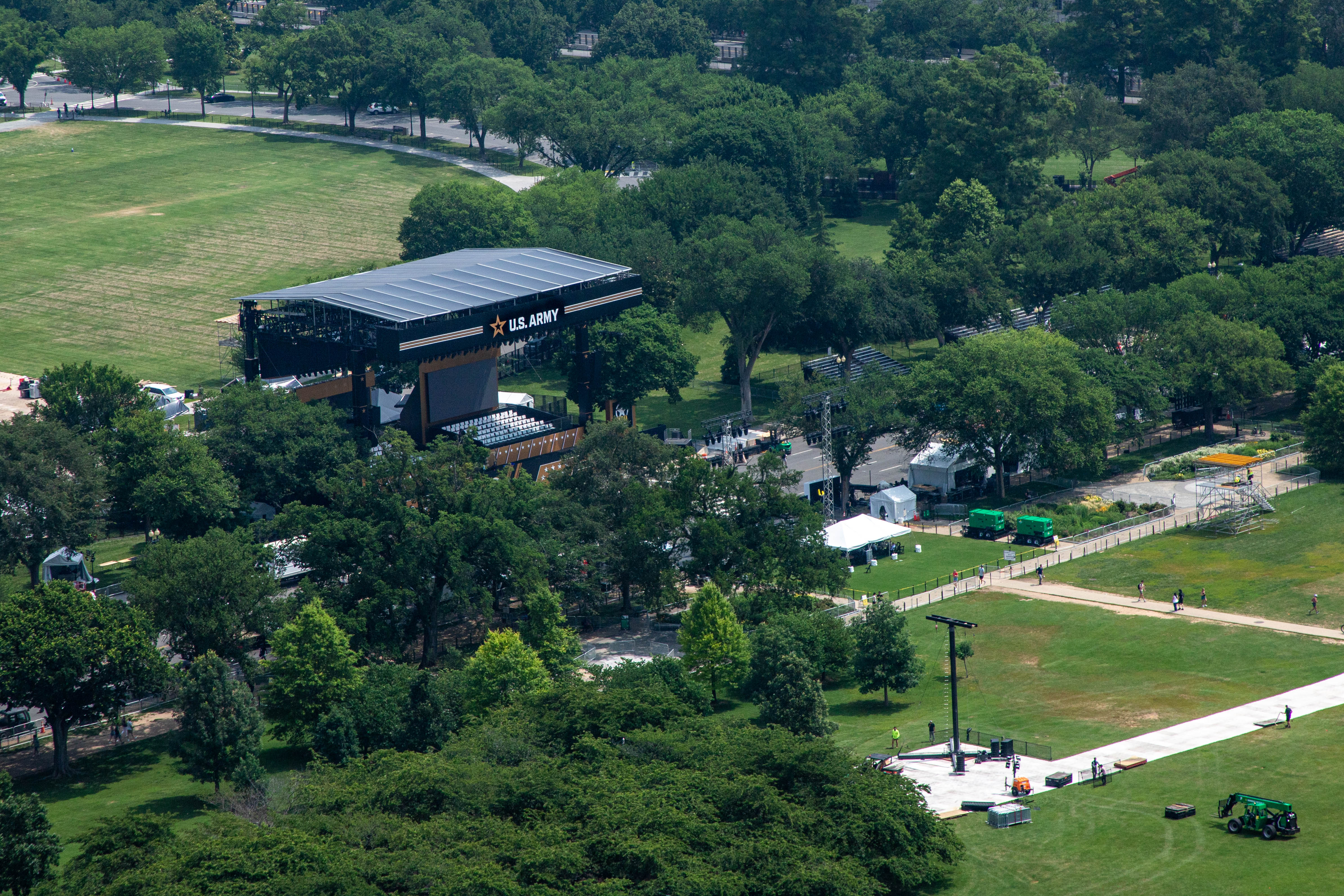
U.S. Army undergoing final preparations for the Army's 250th Birthday parade

The Army began planning a 250th-birthday celebration in 2023, and making plans for an event in Washington, D.C., in 2024. In 2025, during his second term, Trump again ordered a military parade from the Pentagon. The New York Times described the Pentagon's quick acceptance as the result of a more acquiescent Pentagon without the guardrails present in his first term. The Army stated the parade was Trump's idea and planning for it only began a few months beforehand, with Axios describing it as a "soft launch" of official celebrations for the United States Semiquincentennial.

In April 2025, the Army approached D.C. officials about making the 250th birthday celebration bigger by adding demonstrations and vehicle displays on the National Mall in a multi-day event that could also include a military parade.

The original plan called for a parade route that stretched almost four miles (6.4 km) from the Pentagon in Arlington to the White House. Ultimately, a shorter route was chosen.

By May of 2025, the Army was expecting to spend between $25 million and $45 million on the parade, including an estimated $16 million worth of damage to Washington's streets. By comparison, the estimated cost of Trump's planned 2018 military parade, featuring all service branches, was $100 million, the specific focus on the Army was expected to reduce cost. By June, the Army was reporting the parade would cost $40 million. While the parade is unique to the celebration of the Army, no official parades are planned for the Navy or Marines which also celebrate their 250th anniversary in 2025.

Most of the tanks, vehicles and equipment for the parade were shipped from Fort Hood, Texas, to Jessup, Maryland, by train, and were then transported on flatbed trucks to D.C. Soldiers for the parade slept in cots in government buildings, including the Department of Agriculture headquarters, a government warehouse owned by the General Service Administration on Seventh Street, and at Joint Base Andrews. The Army had difficulty finding uniforms for the War of 1812 and the Spanish-American War and eventually eliminated them from the program, due to "running into trouble with the costuming process". Many of the costumes were sourced from Hollywood prop houses.

The parade began 30 minutes early, at 6 p.m. EDT, due to weather conditions. Events related to the 250th Anniversary started earlier in the day at the National Mall, including the "Army's 250th Birthday Festival" which ran from 11 a.m. to 6 p.m. The parade itself followed a route down Constitution Avenue 23rd Street, NW to 15th Street NW, past the White House. Heavy, tracked vehicles were stationed near the Lincoln Memorial. A concert was held at 7:30 p.m. at the Ellipse. The evening ended with a fireworks display.

== Participants, equipment, performers and sponsors ==
Planned route of soldiers (red) and heavy vehicles (blue)

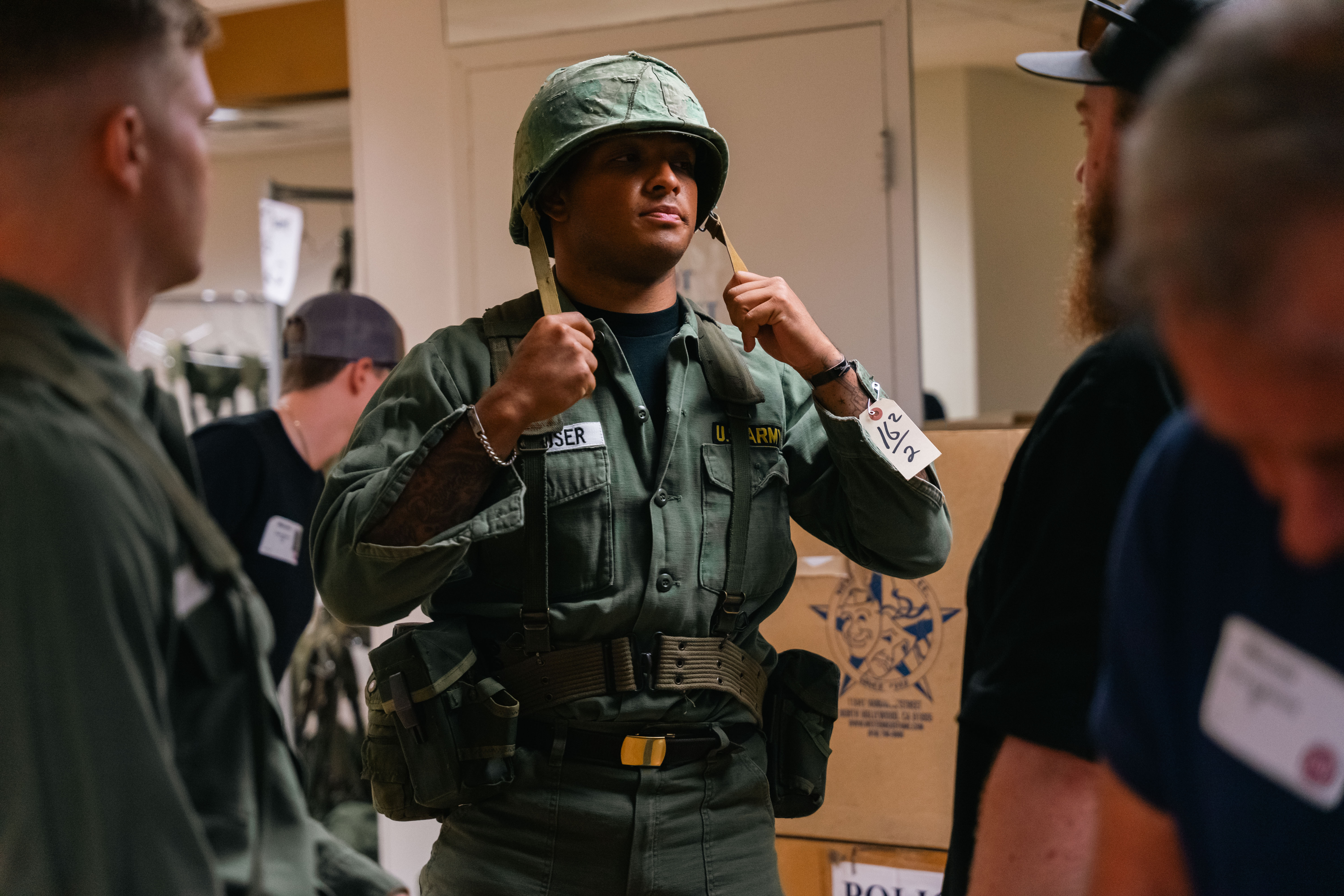
Soldiers in a Vietnam War-era uniform undergoing uniform fitting in preparation of the parade

=== Participants ===
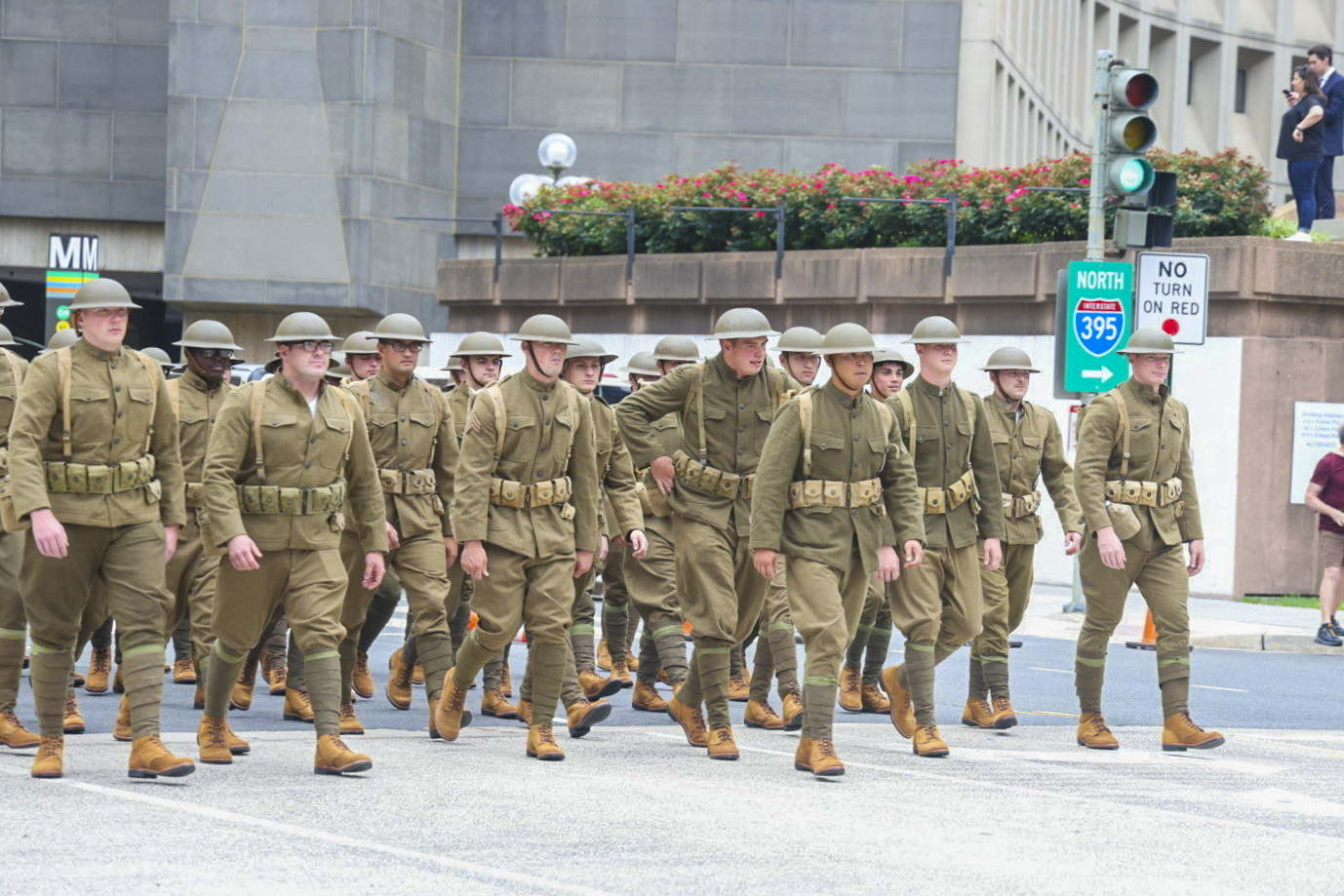
82nd Airborne Division Paratroopers wearing historical WWI-era uniforms prepare to march in Washington, D.C., June 14, 2025

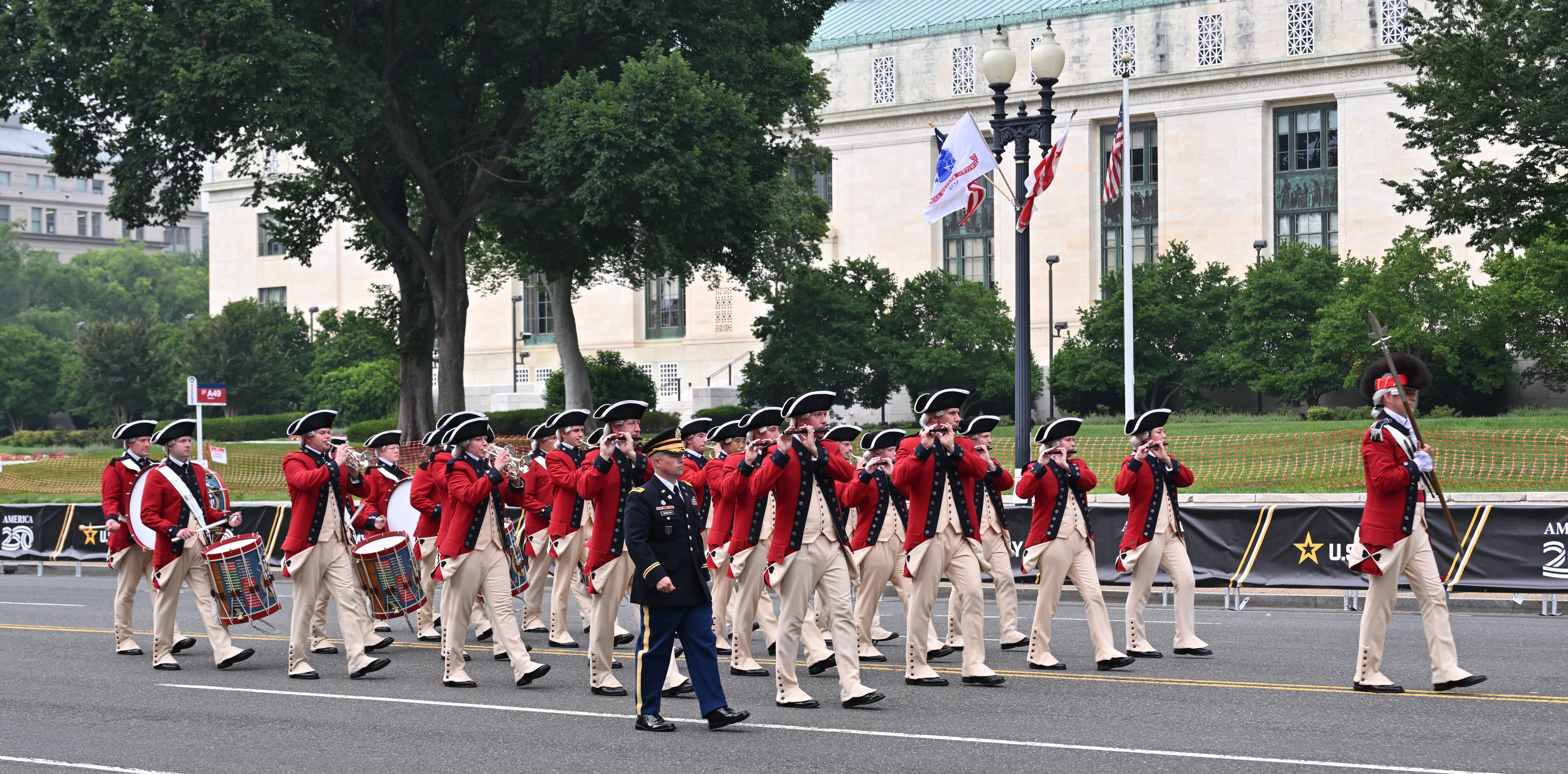
Soldiers in revolutionary war era uniforms marching in the United States Army 250th anniversary parade in Washington, D.C.

The parade included the following participants:

- United States Army Parachute Team ("Golden Knights")
- American Revolutionary War
  - United States Army Band
  - 3rd Infantry Regiment
  - Old Guard Fife and Drum Corps
  - Commander-in-Chief's Guard
- American Civil War
  - 4th Infantry Division
- World War I
  - 42nd Infantry Division
- World War II
  - 82nd Airborne Division
  - 101st Airborne Division
- Korean War
  - 2nd Infantry Division
  - 3rd Infantry Division
- Vietnam War
  - 1st Cavalry Division
  - 25th Infantry Division
- Gulf War
  - 1st Infantry Division
  - 1st Armored Division
- Global War on Terrorism
  - Special Operations Command/Army Rangers
  - 10th Mountain Division
  - 160th Aviation Regiment
- Modern era
  - 7th Infantry Division
  - 11th Airborne Division
  - United States Army Reserve
  - 82nd Combat Aviation Brigade
- Army Future
  - United States Military Academy
  - Initial Entry Training
  - Virginia Military Institute
  - South Carolina Corps of Cadets
  - Texas A&M University Corps of Cadets
  - Re-enlistment/Enlistees

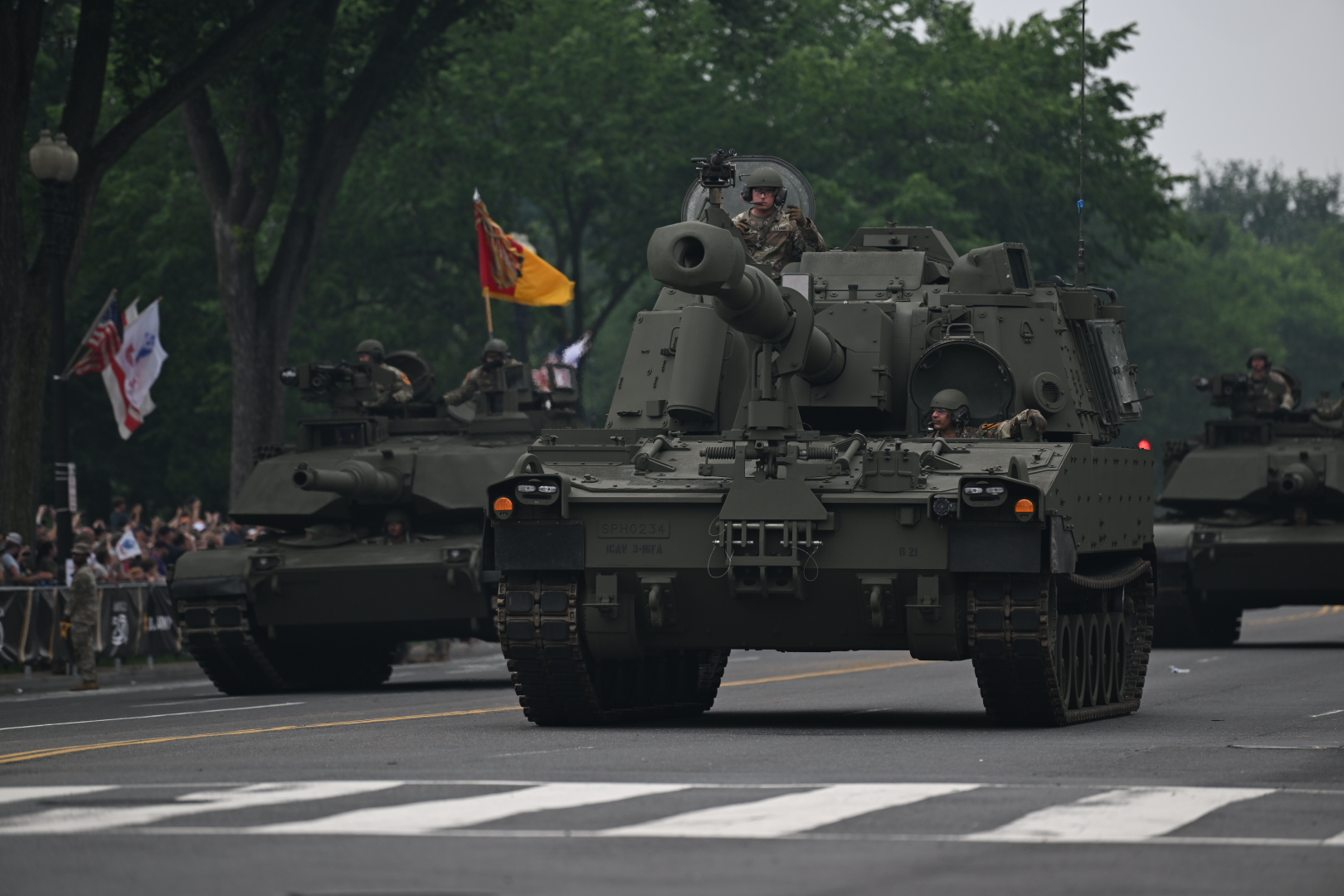
A M109A7 Paladin Self-propelled howitzer and two M1 Abrams tanks during the parade in Washington, D.C.

=== Equipment ===
The parade included the following equipment:

- Bell AH-1 Cobra Helicopters
- Bell UH-1 Iroquois helicopters
- Boeing AH-6
- Boeing AH-64 Apache helicopters
- Boeing CH-47 Chinook helicopters
- Hughes OH-6 Cayuse
- MD Helicopters MH-6 Little Bird
- Sikorsky UH-60 Black Hawk helicopters
- North American B-25 Mitchell
- Douglas C-47 Skytrain
- North American P-51 Mustang
- GMC CCKW 2½-ton 6×6 truck
- M1A2 SEPv3 Abrams main battle tank
- M3 half-track
- M4 Sherman medium tank
- M35 series 2½-ton 6×6 cargo truck
- M109A7 Paladin self-propelled howitzer
- M119 howitzer
- M274 ½-ton 4×4 utility platform truck
- M777 howitzer
- Bradley Fighting Vehicles
- Stryker Armored Fighting Vehicles
- Infantry Squad Vehicles
- Willys Jeep
- Anduril Industries Ghost X
- PDW C100 small unmanned aerial system
- Skydio X10D autonomous drone
- Ghost Robotics V60 Quadruped Uncrewed Ground Vehicle

=== Performers ===
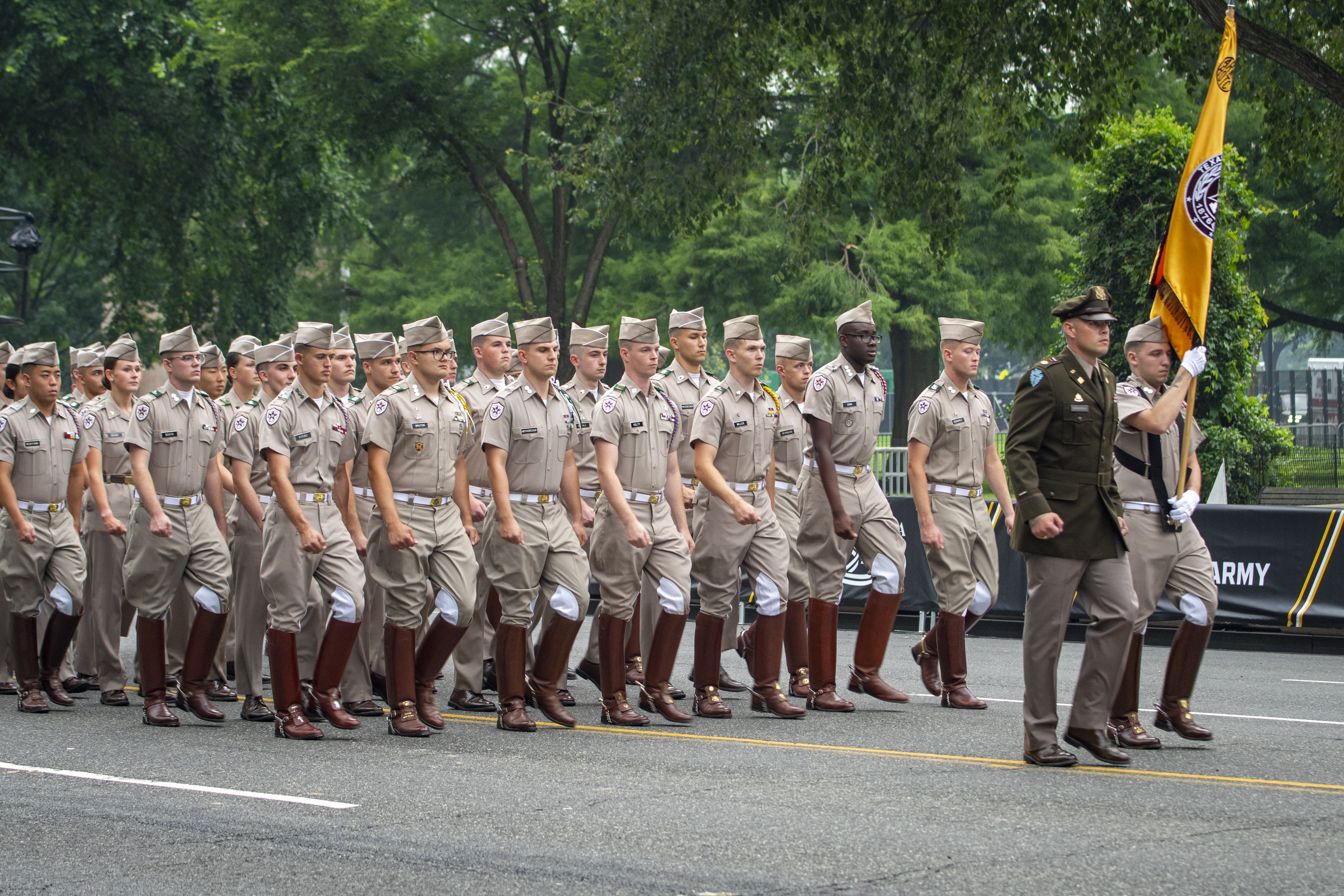
A contingent from the Texas A&M University Corps of Cadets at the U.S. Army 250th Anniversary Parade, June 16, 2025

The concert after the parade included the following performers:

- Warren Zeiders
- Lee Greenwood

=== Sponsors ===
A number of corporations, including Oracle, Amazon, Exiger, BNY, Goldman Sachs, Coinbase, Lockheed Martin, Palantir Technologies, Stellantis (and their Chrysler, Jeep, Dodge and Ram brands), Coca-Cola, Walmart, Ultimate Fighting Championship, Phorm Energy, Nextdoor, FedEx, and Scotts Miracle-Gro, were sponsors of the event.

== Reaction ==
=== Cost concerns ===
The parade drew concern over its high cost, with the Army estimating $25 million to $45 million for the parade, along with an estimated $16 million to damages of the roads. The Army Corps of Engineers stated its worst-case scenario had the cost of damage at $16 million, but that it expected to be reduced to $3.5 million after plans were made to put down steel plates and reinforce them with railroad ties to protect the road. The Army further stated it was placing new track pads on tanks to create further separation between the metal track and the ground. Trump stated that the cost was "peanuts compared to the value of doing it." Criticism was particularly raised over the cost due to the Trump administration's cost-cutting efforts elsewhere in the government for education, health, and public assistance.

The Intercept reported that the $45 million cost was likely an underestimate due to unaccounted for expenses, and that members of Congress were "already expressing outrage at what they see as a gross misuse of funds." Democratic Senator Richard Blumenthal criticized the parade, stating that "Trump squandering $45 million in taxpayer dollars on a military parade for his birthday is the epitome of government waste", calling it "exorbitant" and criticizing it while large budget cuts for "training programs, freezes on hiring, shrinking staff levels, deferring maintenance, jeopardizing equipment maintenance fees" were ongoing. Democratic Representative Steve Cohen stated that "this administration does not have a credible history of telling the truth about anything" and that "when they estimate $45 million, you know that's a low-ball figure". Democratic Senator Tammy Duckworth stated she would rather the Army spend the money on childcare and tuition reimbursement for military families.

Politico reported that GOP senators had questioned the cost of the parade, with Republican Senate Armed Services Committee Chair Roger Wicker saying that "I would have recommended against the parade", but that "the secretary feels that it will be a once-in-a-lifetime opportunity for thousands of young Americans to see what a great opportunity it is to participate in a great military force, that it will be a recruiting tool. So, we'll see." Republican Senate Appropriations Chair Susan Collins stated that she supported celebrating the army, but that "the cost does seem a bit steep". Republican Sen. Ron Johnson stated that "If it costs money, I won't go".

=== Politicization and Trump's birthday ===
The parade was criticized over apparent politicization and its occurrence on Trump's birthday, which was also both the 250th anniversary of the US Army and Flag Day. USA Today reported there was significant debate whether the parade is "a celebration of the Army's storied heritage, or an homage to Trump and the political movement he leads? Or both?" The stated purpose of the parade shifted over time, with the Army first stating that it would not happen on Trump's birthday and later that it would only celebrate the Army's semiquincentennial. Trump defended himself against claims the parade was celebrating his birthday, stating that it was a celebration of Flag Day, the military at large, and vehicles and weapons, saying "I view it for Flag Day, not necessarily my birthday. Somebody put it together. But no, I think we're going to do something on June 14, maybe, or somewhere around there. But I think June 14. It's a very important day." Republican Senator Jim Justice stated that he thought "It's great celebrating President Trump's birthday, and I think it's great celebrating the military".

Democratic lawmakers argued the parade was being used for Trump's own political purposes. Democratic Senator Jack Reed stated that the event was "all about his ego and making everything about him." Democratic Senator Tammy Duckworth criticized Army Secretary Daniel P. Driscoll about the parade, stating "Let's be clear: You're not doing it to celebrate the Army's birthday, you're doing it to stroke Donald Trump's ego". Democratic Senate Armed Services Committee member Richard Blumenthal criticized the parade as celebrating both the Army and Trump's ego, stating that "It is Donald Trump who is the focus of his own attention, and the Army birthday just happened to be a convenient excuse", and questioned why he did not simply celebrate all military services birthdays rather than the only one that fell on his birthday.

On June 10, Politico reported that of 50 federal Republican lawmakers it contacted, only seven planned to attend, with the chairs of the House and Senate Armed Services committees skipping the parade.

Concern was raised over the optics of the parade, with NBC News describing Pentagon worries for the initial 2018 parade that it "could be seen as akin to the kind commonly seen in Moscow, Beijing or Pyongyang, North Korea". The Intercept described the 2025 parade as "a martial spectacle reminiscent of the Soviet Union or North Korea in the heart of America's capital". Associate professor Risa Brooks of Marquette University questioned whether the military was celebrating Trump, stating that "tanks rolling down streets of the capital doesn't look like something consistent with the tradition of a professional, highly capable military" but "looks instead like a military that is politicized and turning inwardly, focusing on domestic oriented adversaries instead of external ones". Republican Senator Rand Paul criticized the parade, stating that he was worried about the image it could send and that he was not a fan of "goose-stepping soldiers and big tanks and missiles rolling down the street" and that "we were always different than, you know, the images you saw in the Soviet Union and North Korea. We were proud not to be that". Both Axios and The New Yorker described the parade as capping off "Trump's Strongman Week" following his military deployment of federal troops during the Los Angeles protests and a partisan speech in front of soldiers at Fort Bragg. Duke University political science professor Peter Feaver stated that on the parade, "the military won't die on this hill even if they do not like it", and that "Trump's 2.0 team is better at giving the president what he wants whether or not it is best in the long run".

Several veterans groups refused to participate in the parade. The Vietnam Veterans of America chapter in Northern Virginia refused to provide 25 veterans seating in the official reviewing stand, with chapter president Jay Kalner stating that "If it were just a matter of celebrating the Army's 250th birthday, there'd be no question" but that "we felt it was being conflated with Trump's birthday, and we didn't want to be a prop for that". PBS News reported that veterans were divided over the parade, with some liking the parade's celebration of the military and service members while others criticized perceived politicization, "chest-pounding", and it distracting from planned budget cuts to the Department of Veterans Affairs.

=== Protests ===
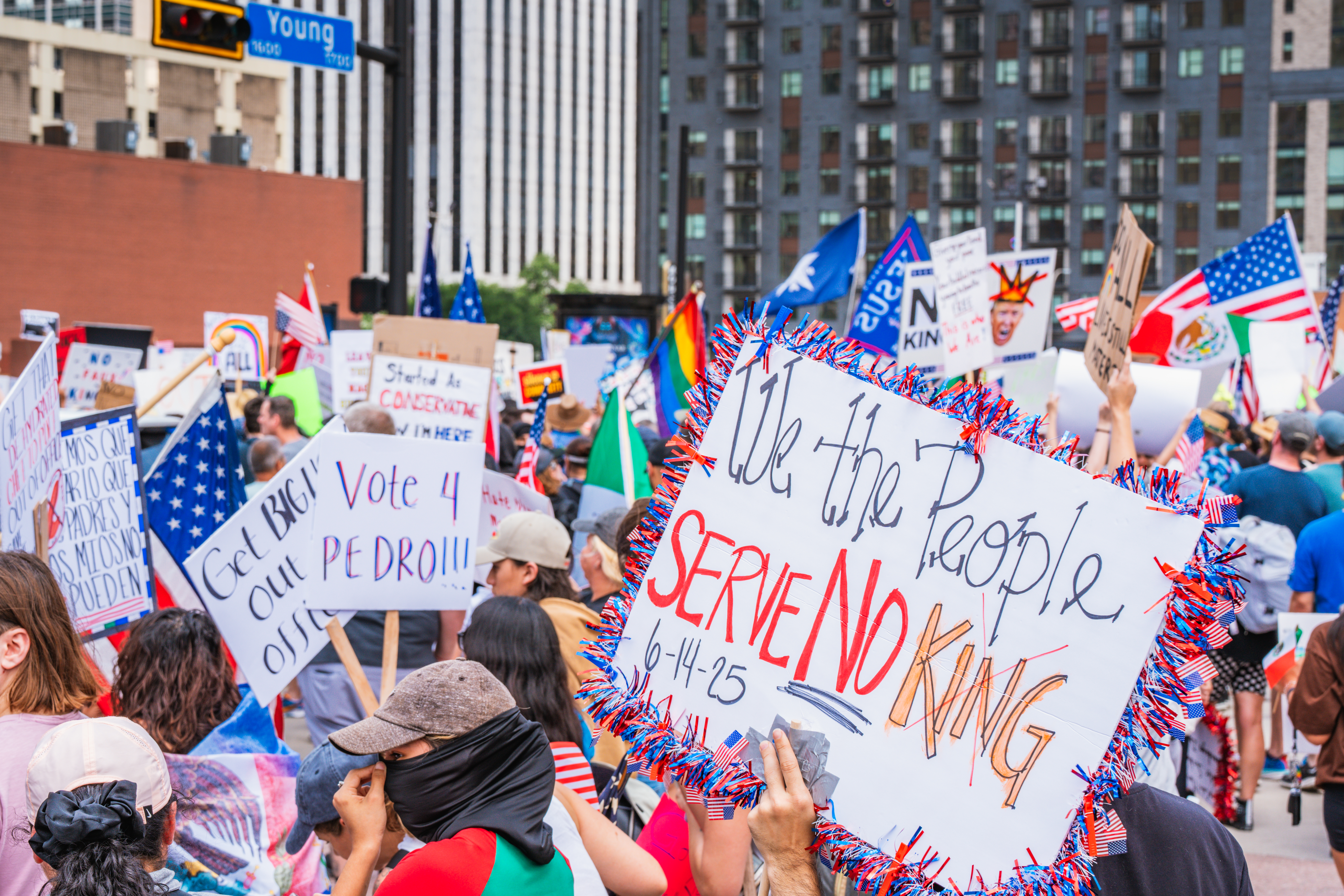
No Kings protestors in Dallas, Texas

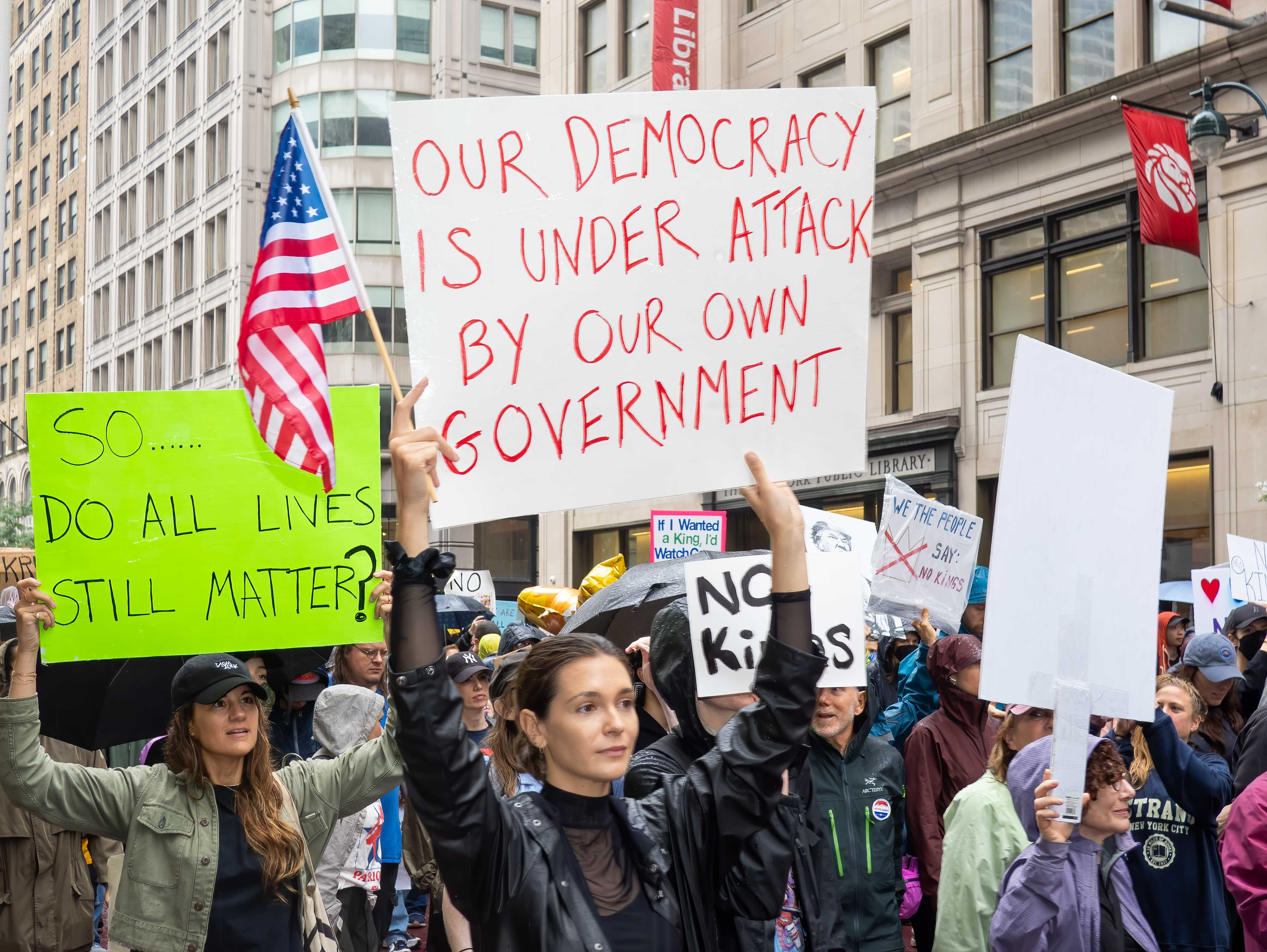
No Kings protestors in New York City

The day before the parade, two groups of veterans and military family members, About Face: Veterans Against the War and Veterans for Peace, led a protest against the parade at the US Capitol. Sixty of the protesters were arrested by Capitol Police. Refuse Fascism held a protest outside the White House prior to the parade.

Coinciding with the parade, millions of demonstrators showed up for the No Kings protests in over 2,000 events across the United States in the largest coordinated protests since the start of the second Trump administration. The protests, organized by the 50501 movement, opposed the parade as well as the policies and actions of Trump in general. The protests followed several days of other protests in response to Immigrations and Custom Enforcement (ICE) raids across the United States, including in California, where Trump deployed both the California National Guard and the United States Marine Corps in response to rioting during the June protests in Los Angeles.

Trump stated that anyone who protested his parade in Washington would be met by "very big force", stating that "this is people that hate our country, but they will be met with very heavy force". The New York Times reported that several current and former Army officials and defense experts were uncomfortable with the optics of the parade following Trump's decision to federalize the California National Guard in Los Angeles and deploy active duty Marines, stating the simultaneous images were a juxtaposition that "could make it appear as if the military is celebrating a crackdown on Americans" and was "not the image Army officials had wanted". The Washington Post described the dueling images as fueling partisan conflict "as some Americans cheer Trump's strong hand in quashing purported chaos and others decry what they see as his growing embrace of authoritarian tactics" and noted the Los Angeles protests were becoming "increasingly conflated" with Trump's parade.

=== Reception ===
The New York Times reported that the parade was overshadowed by the shootings of Minnesota state legislators, Israeli strikes on Iran, and competing narratives on television and social media that criticized the event for using the military to promote Trump and suppress dissent during recent protests. It also described the event as suffering from numerous logistical obstacles and muted enthusiasm from spectators, with its reporters describing "an at-times underwhelming performance and crowds dispersing early amid a light drizzle". The No Kings protests also drew significant television coverage from the event. Organizers for the parade expected "hundreds of thousands" of spectators, although many seats remained empty amid sparse crowds which The Times attributed to the poor weather and nationwide protests. The Wall Street Journal described the crowds as "sparse" and "celebratory but subdued". BBC News described the simultaneous protests and parade as a "split screen" and "a day of two distinct public displays". The Guardian described the parade as "neither the totalitarian North Korean spectacle that critics had grimly predicted, nor the triumph of MAGA nationalism that Trump's most diehard fans craved", but was simply a parade that was "a little underwhelming". It described the public event as poorly planned, with too few and overflowing garbage cans, not enough exits, only a handful of food trucks, and a lack of signs and directions making it difficult to find one's way in or out. It quoted a Secret Service officer who stated "Nobody knows what's going on." The event's corporate sponsorships with four companies with close connections to President Trump drew ethics concerns over possible violations of federal regulations.

Many social media users mocked the parade due to poor marching and a lack of sync and discipline among parading personnel. One user commented that the lack of enthusiasm made it look like "prisoners of war are marching".

According to journalist Michael Wolff, Trump "kind of reamed out" Defense Secretary Pete Hegseth about the parade, because he thought its tone was wrong, with Wolff describing Trump as wanting a "menacing" parade and was unhappy about soldiers "having a good time, that they were waving, that they were enjoying themselves and showing a convivial face rather than a military face". White House communications director Steven Cheung responded to the allegations by calling Wolff "a lying sack of shit".

Trump said that the parade was a "tremendous success", that "it didn't rain at all" despite forecasts and was "beautiful".

=== Polling ===
An AP-NORC at the University of Chicago poll released on June 12 found that 60% of all US adults thought the parade was not a good use of government money compared to 38% who thought it was. It also found 40% approved of the parade compared to 29% who disapproved and 31% who did not choose either option. An NBC poll conducted from May 30-June 10 and released on the day of the parade found that 64% of respondents opposed the use of government funds for the event.

== Security measures ==
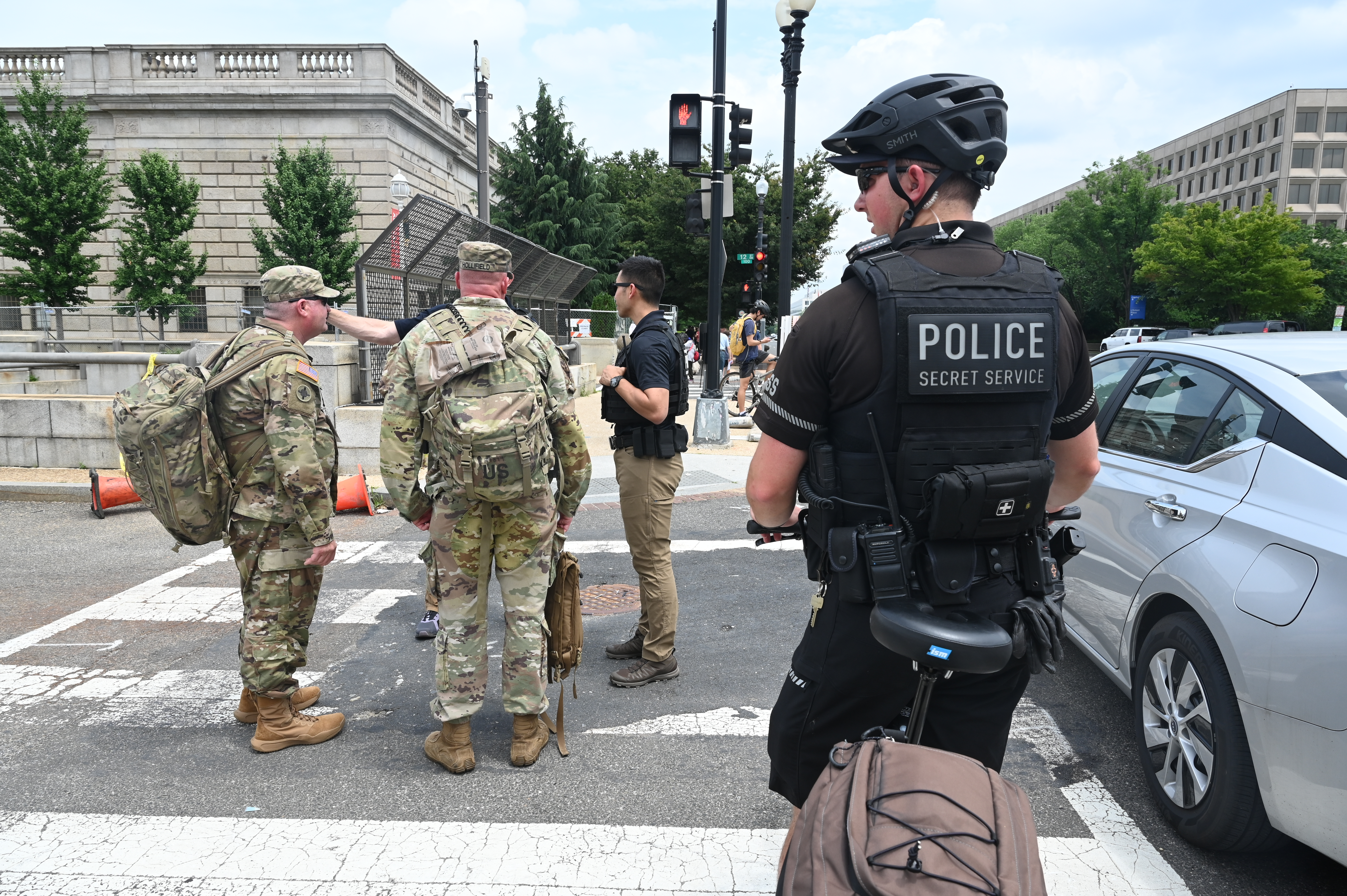
National Guard and Secret Service providing security during the parade

The parade was classified as a national special security event, and had various impacts on travel in metropolitan Washington. Roads around the parade were closed for multiple days and many Metrobus lines had detours.

The FAA set temporary flight restrictions within the special flight rules area around Reagan National Airport to suspend flights for the parade from 6 p.m to 9:30 p.m, which is unusually disruptive. Some airlines cancelled flights to prepare for the event and suggested that customers use other nearby airports instead.

Two days after the parade, a woman was killed when she was struck by a truck carrying a tank away from the parade area.

== Media coverage ==
C-SPAN televised the entire parade, as well as the cable news channels CNN, Fox News, MSNBC, NewsNation, Newsmax, Real America's Voice, and One America News Network, and the streaming television news channels ABC News Live, CBS News 24/7, and NBC News Now.
