= Armed Forces Day Parade (Bremerton) =

Longest-running Armed Forces Day parade in the US

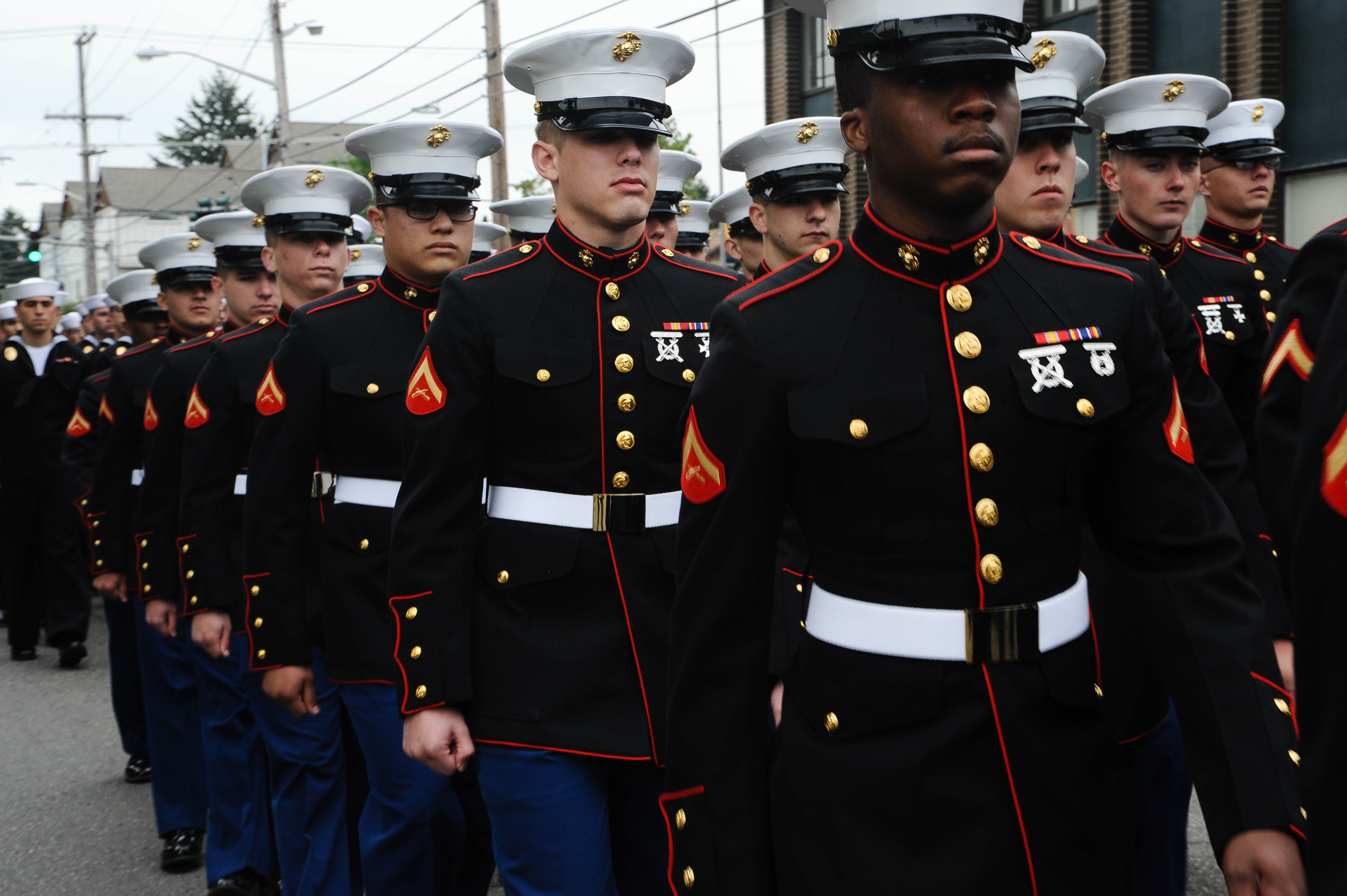
- Marines of the Marine Corps Security Force Regiment pictured during the 2015 Armed Forces Day Parade
- Status: Active
- Frequency: Annually
- Locations: Bremerton, Washington, United States
- Inaugurated: May 15, 1948
- Attendance: 25,000 to 40,000
- Website: greaterkitsapchamber.com/armed-forces-day-festival/

The Armed Forces Day Parade in Bremerton, Washington is the longest-running Armed Forces Day parade in the United States. (Note: Torrance, California claims the longest-running Armed Forces Day parade in the United States sponsored by a municipality; Bremerton's is organized by the local chamber of commerce.)

Established in 1948 to honor John D. Hawk, the Armed Forces Day Parade is part of the Bremerton Armed Forces Day Festival and is held on the third Saturday in May. As of 2018, it had an average annual attendance of between 25,000 and 40,000 spectators and participants. Notable former grand marshals of the parade include Nora W. Tyson.

The 2020 parade was postponed from its traditional date due to the COVID-19 pandemic.

== See also ==
- Naval Base Kitsap
- Veterans Day Parade (New York City)
