= Berlin Victory Parade of 1945 =

Celebration of the Allies' WWII victory

Berlin Victory Parade
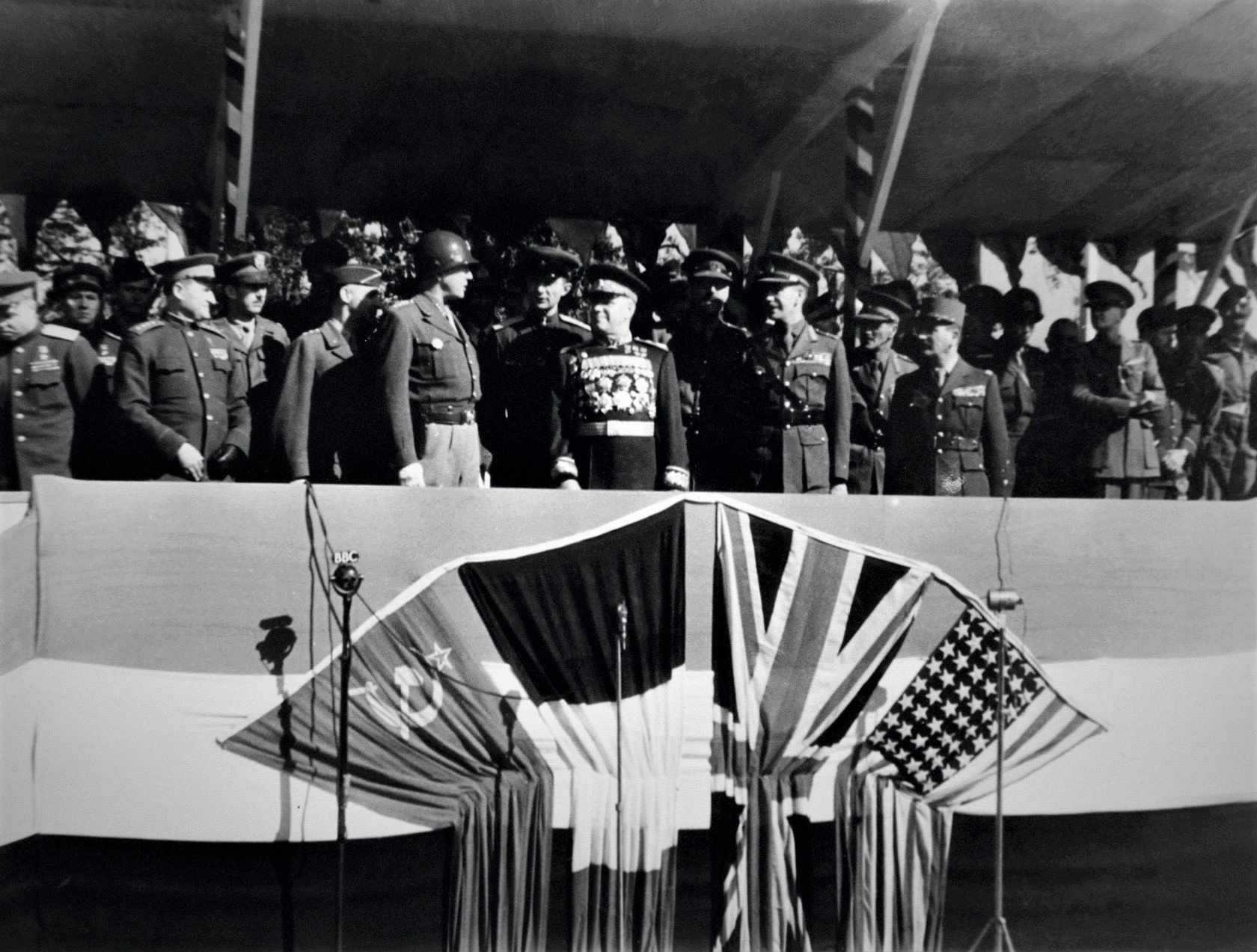
- On the central tribune (left to right): U.S. General George S. Patton, Soviet Marshal Georgy Zhukov, British Major General Brian H. Robertson, and French General Marie-Pierre Kœnig.
- Date: 7 September 1945
- Location: Berlin, Germany
- Also known as: The "Forgotten Parade"

The Berlin Victory Parade of 1945 was held by the Allies of World War II on 7 September 1945 in Berlin, the capital of the defeated Germany, shortly after the end of World War II. The four participating countries were the Soviet Union, the United States, the United Kingdom, and France.

The parade was proposed by the Soviet Union, following the June Moscow Victory Parade of 1945. July in Berlin also saw a British parade (the 1945 British Berlin Victory Parade).

Senior officers present at the parade were Marshal of the Soviet Union Georgy Zhukov from the USSR, General George S. Patton from the United States, General Brian Robertson, from the United Kingdom, and General Marie-Pierre Kœnig from France. General Dwight D. Eisenhower and Field Marshal Bernard Montgomery declined the invitations shortly before the parade, and sent Patton and Robertson as their representatives. Units present included the Soviet 248th Rifle Division, the French 2nd Infantry Division, the British 131st Infantry Brigade, and the U.S. 82nd Airborne Division; the forces present came primarily from the local garrisons. The armoured contingent came from the British 7th Armoured Division, French 1st Armored Division, and U.S. 16th Mechanized Cavalry Group. The Red Army used this occasion for the first public display of the IS-3 heavy tank, with 52 tanks from the 2nd Guards Tank Army participating.

Russian sources refer to this parade as a "forgotten parade", as it was mentioned in only a few Western sources. The forces of four Allies also participated in another Berlin parade several months later, on the Charlottenburger Chaussee, in front of the Brandenburg Gate, on the first anniversary of the German surrender on 8 May 1946, in the Berlin Victory Parade of 1946. This parade was connected to the inauguration of the Soviet War Memorial at Tiergarten. Soviet troops were not present at the much more widely known in the West London Victory Celebrations of 1946.

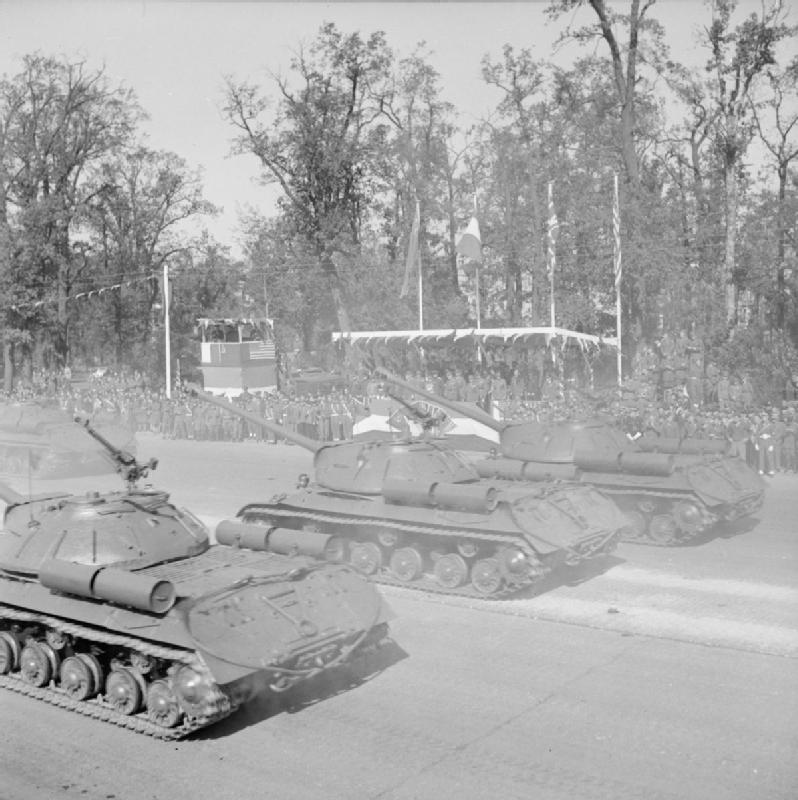
Soviet IS-3 heavy tanks driving down the Charlottenburger Chaussee in Berlin during the parade

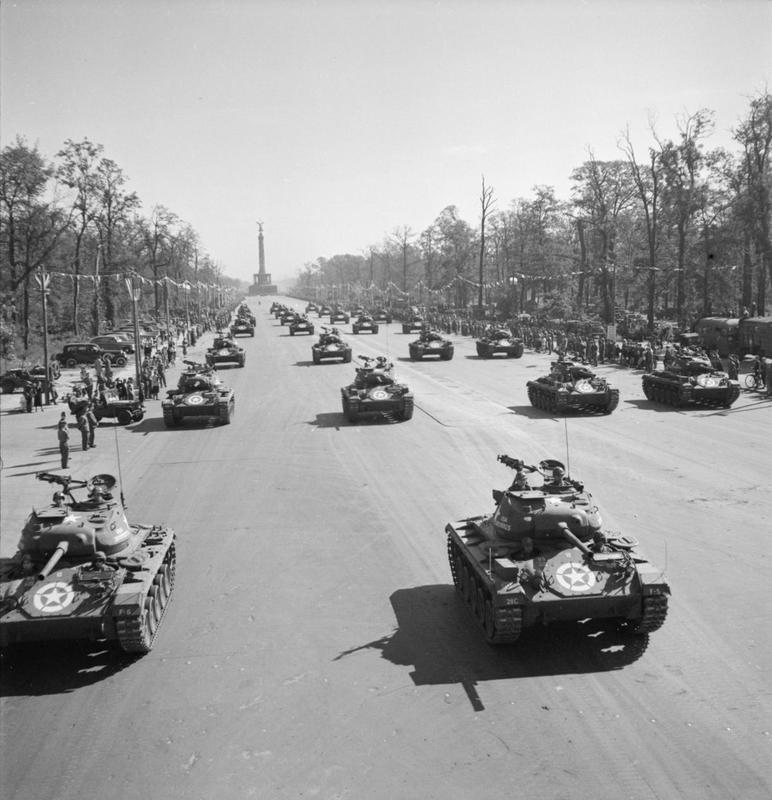
American M24 'Chaffee' Light Tanks during the parade.

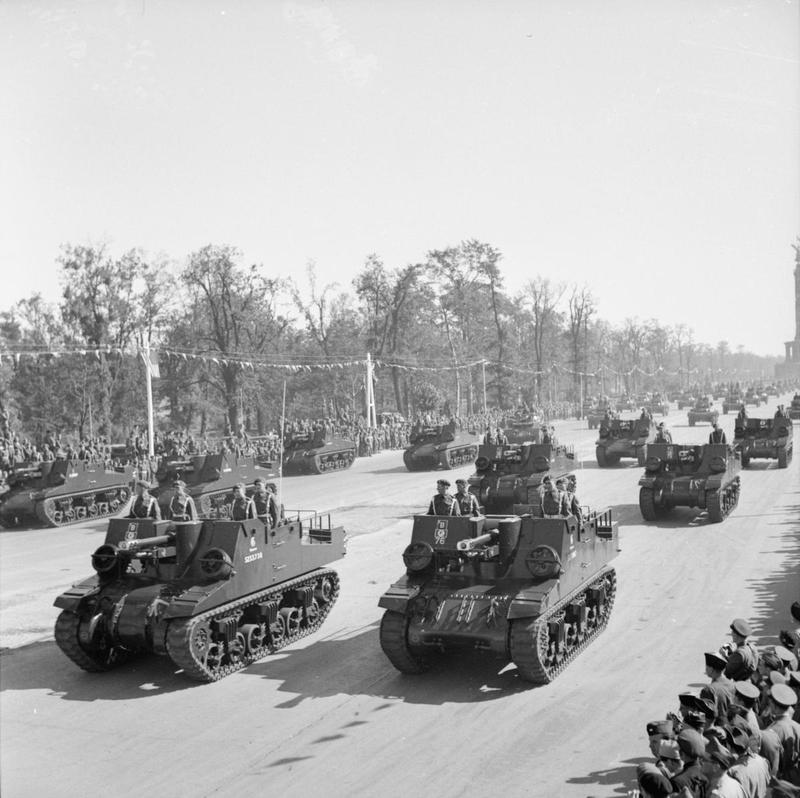
British Sexton self-propelled guns.

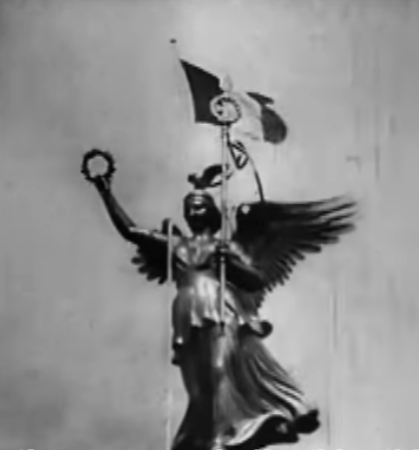
French tricolor on the Victory Column statue during the parade

== See also ==
- Moscow Victory Parade of 1945
- London Victory Celebrations of 1946
- New York City Victory Parade of 1946
