= London Victory Celebrations of 1946 =

British World War II victory celebrations

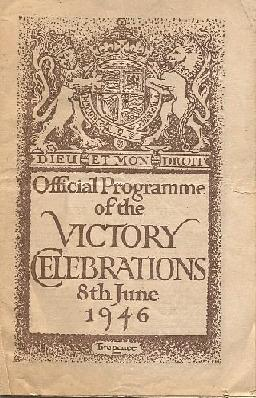
The Official Programme of the Victory Celebrations.

The London Victory Celebrations of 1946 were British Commonwealth, Empire and Allied victory celebrations held on 8 June 1946 after the defeat of Nazi Germany and Japan in the Second World War. On 1 November 1945 the Prime Minister, Clement Attlee, appointed a committee under the chairmanship of the Home Secretary, James Chuter Ede to formulate plans for official victory celebrations. The celebrations took place in London on 8 June 1946, and consisted mainly of a military parade through the city and a night time fireworks display. Most British allies took part in the parade, including Belgium, Brazil, Canada, China, Czechoslovakia, France, Greece, Luxembourg, the Netherlands, South Africa and the United States.

== Victory parade ==
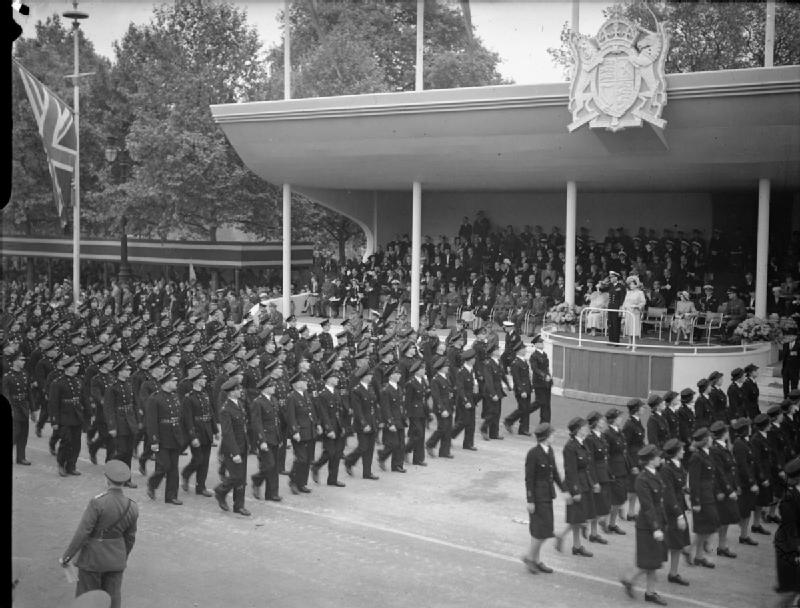
The King and Queen take the salute of WRNS and National Fire Service marchers.

Representatives of the Greek armed forces, including two Evzones in their traditional fustanella.

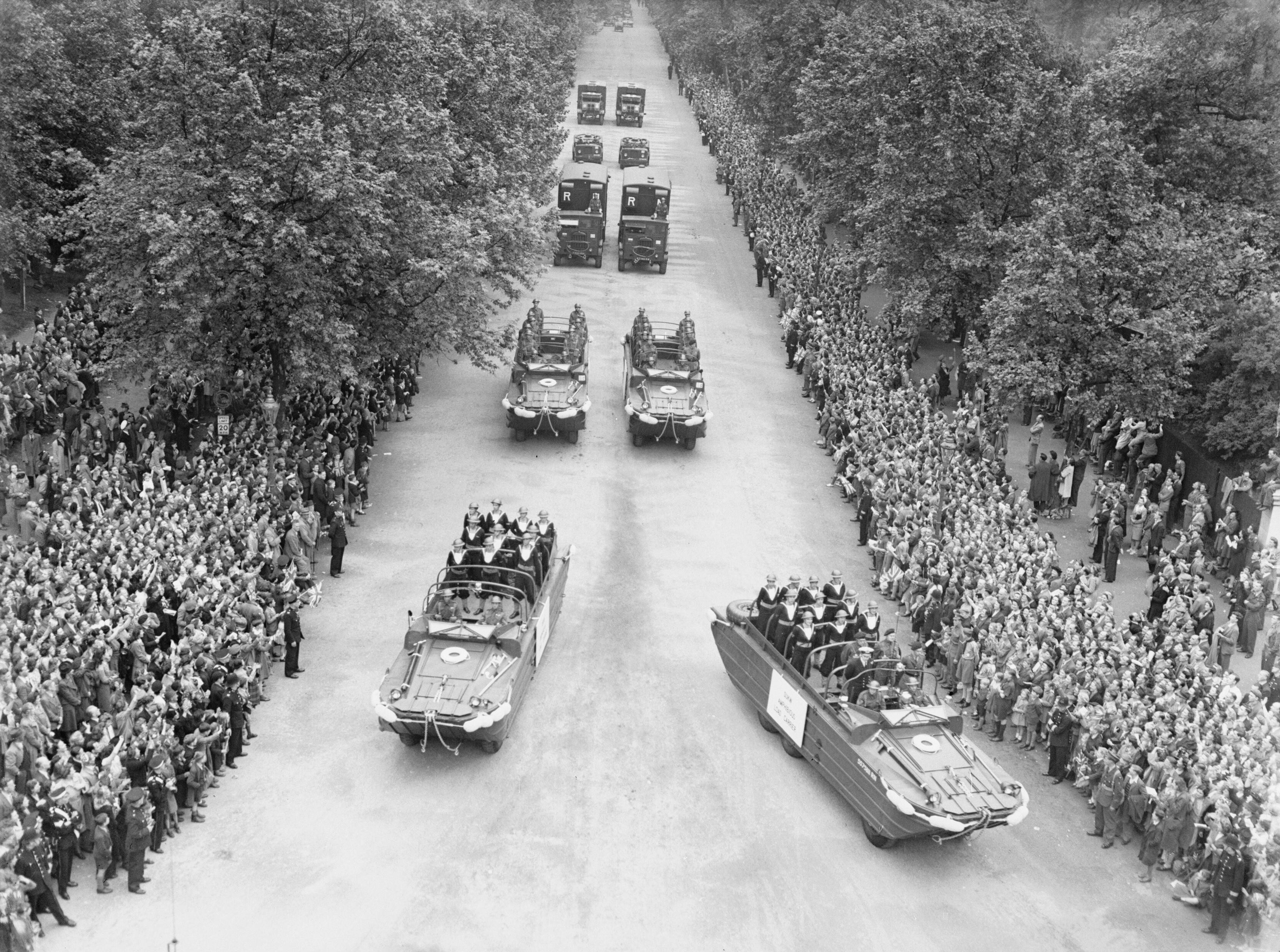
Four DUKW amphibious vehicles taking part in the Victory Parade in London on 8 June 1946.

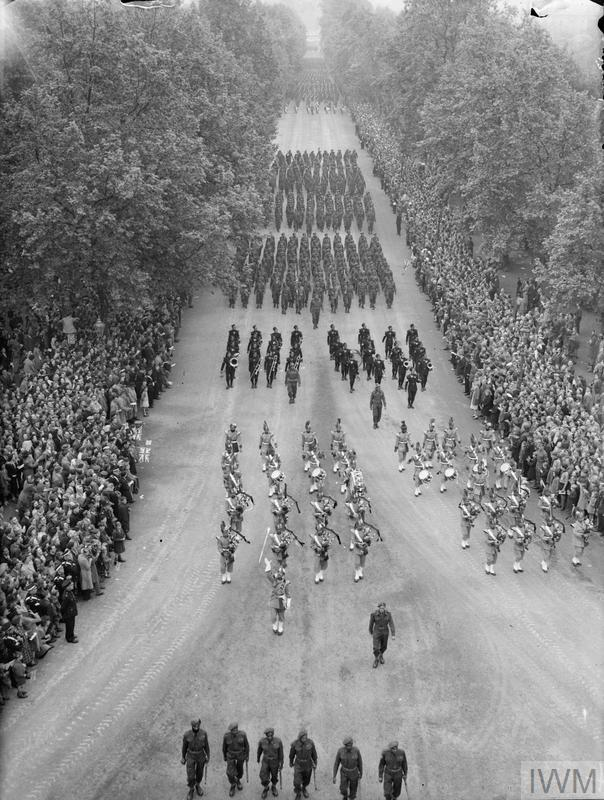
Regiments of the Indian Army march in the Victory Parade.

The event started at 10:10 am, when King George VI, Queen Elizabeth, Princess Elizabeth and Princess Margaret left Buckingham Palace in a state landau; escorted by the Household Cavalry, they took a circuitous route to the saluting dias in The Mall, via Marble Arch, Oxford Street and Charing Cross Road. The royal party was joined in The Mall by Queen Mary, Clement Attlee, Sir Winston Churchill and the prime ministers of the Dominions.

The first part of the parade was the Chiefs of Staff's procession, featuring the British Chiefs of Staff together with the Supreme Allied Commanders. This was followed by a mechanised column which went from Regent's Park to Tower Hill to The Mall, and then back to Regent's Park. It was more than four miles long and contained more than 500 vehicles from the Royal Navy, the Royal Air Force, British civilian services and the British Army (in that order). The column had earlier made a 17-mile (27-kilometre) tour of east and south London.

Next came a marching column, which went from Marble Arch to The Mall to Hyde Park Corner. This was headed by the flags of the Allied nations which took part in the parade, each with an honour guard. Next came units of the navies, air forces, civilian services and units of the British Empire, and the armed forces of the Dominions. They were followed by units from the Royal Navy, followed by British civilian services, the British Army, representatives of certain Allied air forces and the Royal Air Force. This was followed by a fly-past of 300 aircraft, led by Douglas Bader. In the aftermath, 4,127 persons needed medical attention and 65 were taken to hospital.

Most of the allies were represented at the parade, including representatives from the US, France, Belgium, Brazil, Czechoslovakia, Denmark, Egypt, Ethiopia, Greece, Iran, Iraq, Luxembourg, Mexico, Nepal, Netherlands, Norway and Transjordan. The only allied countries not represented at the parade were the USSR, Yugoslavia, and Poland.

The total number of service personnel and civilians in the parade was twenty-two thousand. The population of London was reported to have swelled from seven to twelve million for the event.

=== Commonwealth contingents ===
==== Australia ====
The Australian contingent was headed by Major-General Kenneth Eather, an officer with a distinguished record in the war. The contingent consisted of 225 men and 19 women, drawn from the three services: 160 from Army, 59 from the Royal Australian Air Force, and 25 from the Royal Australian Navy. The contingent included Private Richard Kelliher, Private Frank Partridge, and Sergeant Reginald Rattey, who had won the Victoria Cross in the Battle of Lae in 1943. The Victory March Contingent sailed for the United Kingdom on HMAS Shropshire on 18 April 1946 and reached Portsmouth on 30 May.

==== Canada ====
The Canadian contingent was led by Major-General Christopher Vokes, together with Captain Adrian Hope of the Royal Canadian Navy and Air Commodore Harold Godwin of the Royal Canadian Air Force. The total size of the contingent was 29 officers and 267 other ranks.

==== New Zealand ====
New Zealand was represented on the victory march by a contingent of 300 former and serving members of the armed forces. The contingent consisted of 150 representatives of the army, 100 of the Royal New Zealand Air Force, and 50 of the Royal New Zealand Navy. Women were also included in all three sections, and there was representation of the Māori Battalion. The contingent was commanded by Lieutenant-General Sir Edward Puttick, the General Officer Commanding of the New Zealand Forces during the war. The Contingent included the Victoria Cross holders, Colonel Leslie Andrew, Sergeant Alfred Clive Hulme and Charles Upham. The contingent sailed from New Zealand on 20 April on the New Zealand hospital ship Maunganui.

==== South Africa ====
Led by Major-General William Henry Evered Poole, the contigent consisted of 233 men and 17 women. They were flown to London in stages over six days by Douglas Dakota aircraft.

==== India ====
Led by Brigadier Jayanto Nath Chaudhuri, the Royal Indian Navy, Indian Army (including Gurkhas, the Indian States Forces and the Burma Army) and the Royal Indian Air Force were represented by 79 officers and 532 other ranks.

=== Controversy about Poland ===
The British government initially invited the government in Poland to send a flag party to represent Poland among the allied forces in the parade, but did not specifically invite representatives of the Polish forces in exile that had fought under British High Command. Britons including Winston Churchill, figures in the RAF and a number of MPs protested against the decision, which was described as an affront to the Polish war effort as well as an immoral concession to communist power. After these complaints, 25 pilots of the Polish fighter squadrons in the Royal Air Force, who had taken part in the Battle of Britain, were invited to march together with other foreign detachments as part of the parade of the Royal Air Force. Last-minute invitations were sent by Foreign Secretary Ernest Bevin directly to the Chief of Staff of the Polish Army, General Stanisław Kopański, who was still in post in London, and to the chiefs of the Polish Air Force and the Polish Navy and to individual generals. These invitations were declined, and the airmen refused to participate in protest against the omission of the other branches of the Western backed Polish forces in exile.

The Polish government, in turn, chose not to send a delegation, and later cited the invitation to the exiled pilots as its reason to stay away. In the end, the parade took place without any Polish forces. The Soviet Union and Yugoslavia also stayed away.

== Nighttime festivities ==
After sunset, the principal buildings of London were lit by floodlights, and crowds thronged the banks of the River Thames and Westminster Bridge to watch King George VI and his family proceed down the river in the royal barge. The planned festivities ended with a fireworks display over Central London. However, crowds continued to gather in London and surrounded Buckingham Palace even after the royal family had retired from the festivities. Many festival goers could not return home that night and spent the rest of the night in public parks and other public areas around London.

== Events for children ==
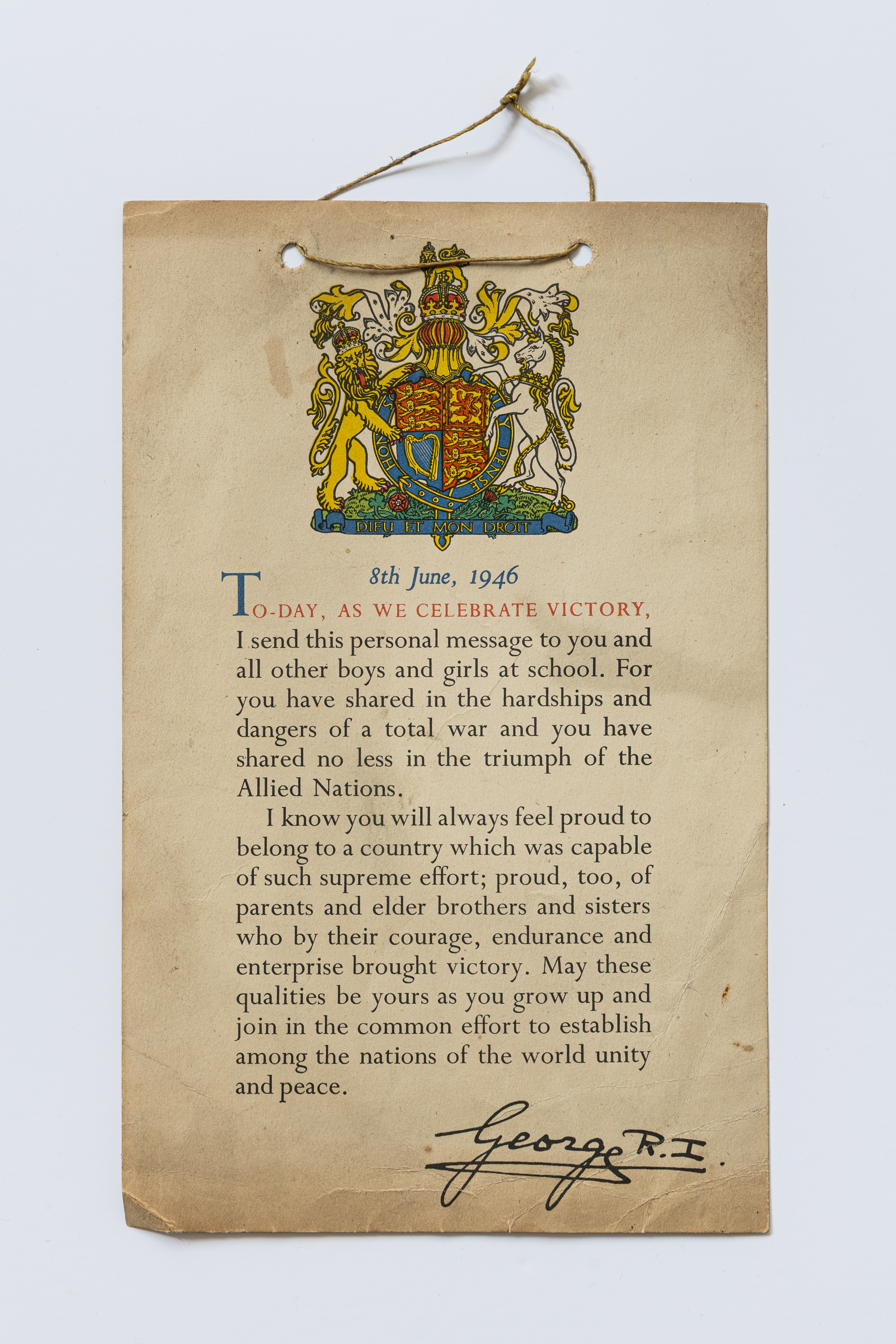
A letter from King George VI sent to British schoolchildren to mark the London Victory Celebrations at the end of World War II, on 8 June 1946

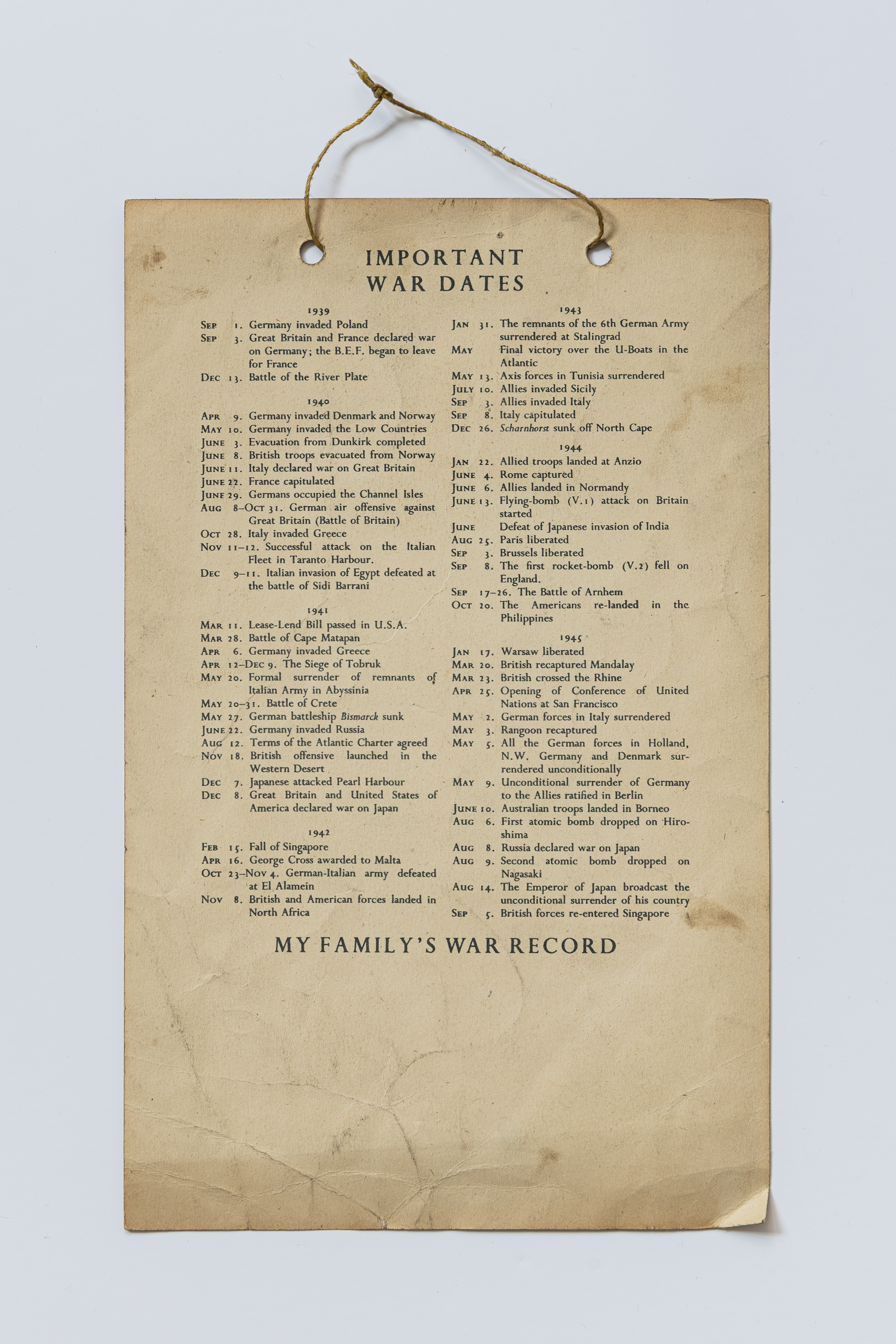
The reverse of a letter from King George VI sent to British schoolchildren on 8 June 1946, listing notable dates of World War II

Entertainments were arranged for children in London's parks and a personal message from King George was printed on card and distributed to school children across the United Kingdom. The text on the front of the card read:

8th June, 1946

TO-DAY AS WE CELEBRATE VICTORY, I send this personal message to you and all other boys and girls at school. For you have shared in the hardships and dangers of a total war and you have shared no less in the triumph of the Allied Nations.

I know you will always feel proud to belong to a country which was capable of such supreme effort; proud, too, of parents and elder brothers and sisters who by their courage, endurance and enterprise brought victory. May these qualities be yours as you grow up and join in the common effort to establish among the nations of the world unity and peace.

George R.I.

The reverse of the card listed notable events from the war by date.

== Media ==
The event was covered by BBC Radio with a commentary by Peter Scott. An outside broadcast of the parade was shown on BBC Television, which had only reopened after the war on the previous day. It was claimed that it was watched by "a few thousand" viewers in the London area. Much more widely seen were the newsreels made by the five leading British news film companies, which were claimed to be "the biggest ever cinema attractions" and resulted in long queues outside cinemas.

== See also ==
- Peace Day 1919
- Berlin Victory Parade of 1945
