= WRNS (disambiguation) =

WRNS most commonly refers to the Women's Royal Naval Service, the former women's branch of the British Royal Navy.

WRNS may also refer to:

- WRNS (AM), a radio station (960 AM) licensed to serve Kinston, North Carolina, United States
- WRNS-FM, a radio station (95.1 FM) licensed to serve Kinston, North Carolina
