= New York at War =

World War II parade

External videos
- American on the March! (Paramount News), a video of the parade from Getty Images

Still from a video of the parade shows "Hitler the Axis War Monster"

"New York at War" was a military parade and civilian home front procession held supporting the World War II mobilization effort on June 13, 1942. It was considered at the time the largest parade ever held in New York City, with up to 500,000 marching up Fifth Avenue (from Washington Square Park to 79th Street) and 2,500,000 spectators in attendance.

The parade coincided with a global "United Nations Day" launched by President Franklin Roosevelt tied to US Flag Day on June 14, six months after the Declaration by United Nations.

Hugo Gellert led a committee of artists that designed the approximately 300 floats in the parade.

The march was organized by Mayor Fiorello H. La Guardia as honorary chairman, his deputy Grover Whalen as chairman, and General Hugh Aloysius Drum as grand marshal. Other dignitaries on the reviewing stand included Governor Herbert H. Lehman, Vice President Henry A. Wallace, the exiled King George II of Greece and Prime Minister Emmanouil Tsouderos, President of the Philippines Manuel L. Quezon, Duchess of Windsor Wallis Simpson, and Princess Märtha of Sweden.

Despite a celebration of groups including German Americans and Italian Americans, Japanese Americans were excluded from the march, leading to objections from the American Civil Liberties Union.

== See also ==
- Operation Pastorius, German saboteurs in Manhattan at time of parade
- New York City Victory Parade of 1946
