= New York City Victory Parade of 1946 =

Post WWII victory Parade in New York City

The New York City Victory Parade of 1946 was held in New York City, United States, on January 12, 1946, to celebrate the victorious conclusion of World War II.

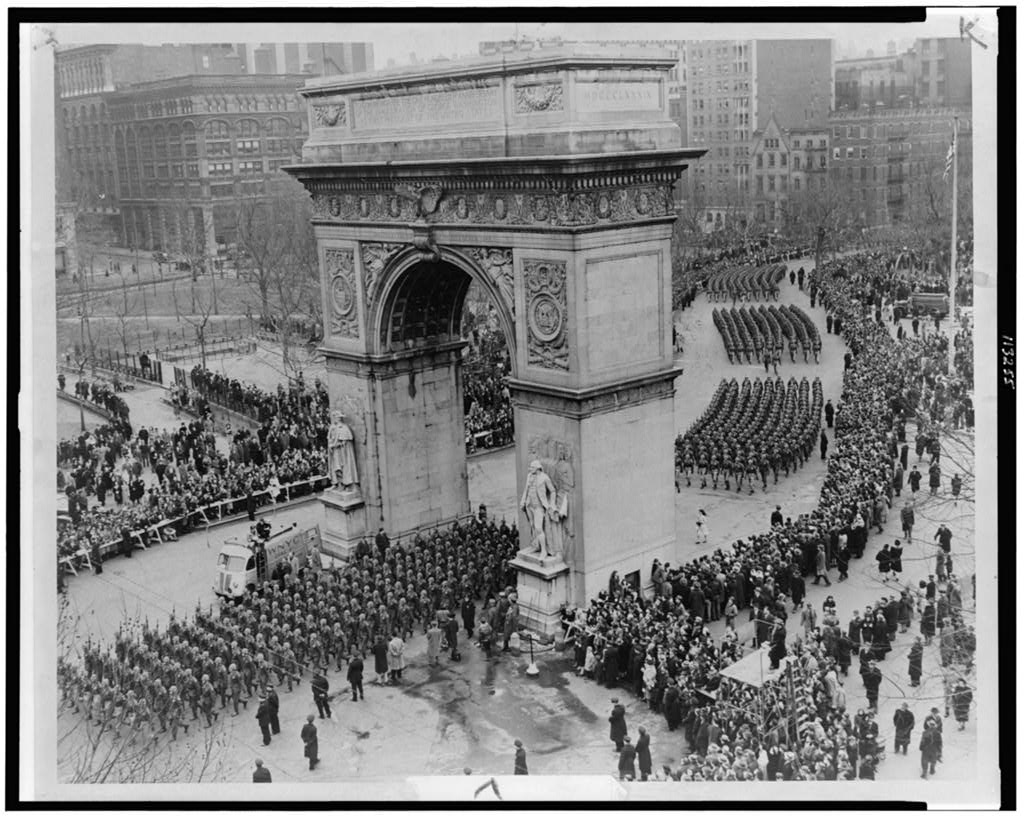
U.S. Army's 82nd Airborne Division parade in New York City

== History ==
The parade was led by 13,000 men of the 82nd Airborne Division (including the African-American 555th Parachute Infantry Battalion) under General James M. Gavin. The 82nd was chosen as the All-American Division to represent the U.S. Army and the end of World War II. The parade also included Sherman tanks and other armored vehicles, such as self-propelled howitzers, and a fly-by of a formation of glider-towing C-47s. The 82nd also participated in the September Berlin Victory Parade of 1945.

In preparation for the New York parade, the division mustered and trained three times a day since late 1945, after having finished their garrison duty in Berlin. The division arrived in United States on January 3 aboard the RMS Queen Mary, and continued training for the parade at Camp Shanks.

The parade, beginning at Washington Square, marching up Fifth Avenue, was reported to be four miles long. It was a ticker tape parade, and was covered by newsreels of the time. However, Life magazine reported that it was "oddly subdued", and blamed it on the elimination of many military bands by the demilitarization. Government officials witnessing the parade included the New York Governor, Thomas E. Dewey the New York City Mayor, William O'Dwyer, and the former New York City Mayor, Fiorello LaGuardia.

New York was the site of the largest American Victory in Europe Day celebrations. Two months earlier, on 27 October 1945, it also witnessed a naval victory parade.

== See also ==
- New York at War, 1942 mobilization parade
- Berlin Victory Parade of 1945
- Moscow Victory Parade of 1945
- London Victory Celebrations of 1946
