= April 1918 =

Month in 1918

<<	April 1918					>>
Su	Mo	Tu	We	Th	Fr	Sa
	1	2	3	4	5	6
7	8	9	10	11	12	13
14	15	16	17	18	19	20
21	22	23	24	25	26	27
28	29	30

The Royal Air Force is established.

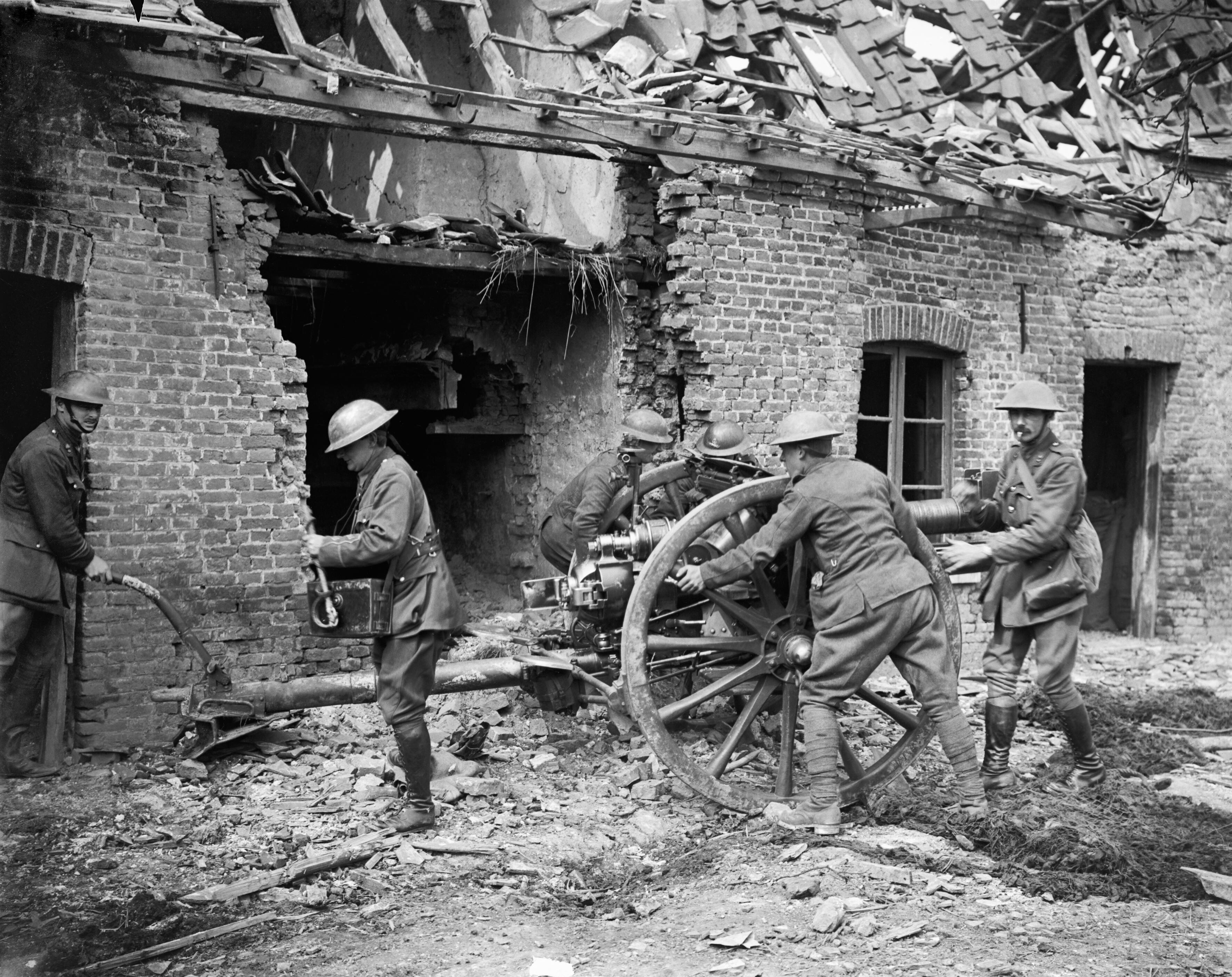
British gunners defending against the German offensive during the Battle of the Lys.

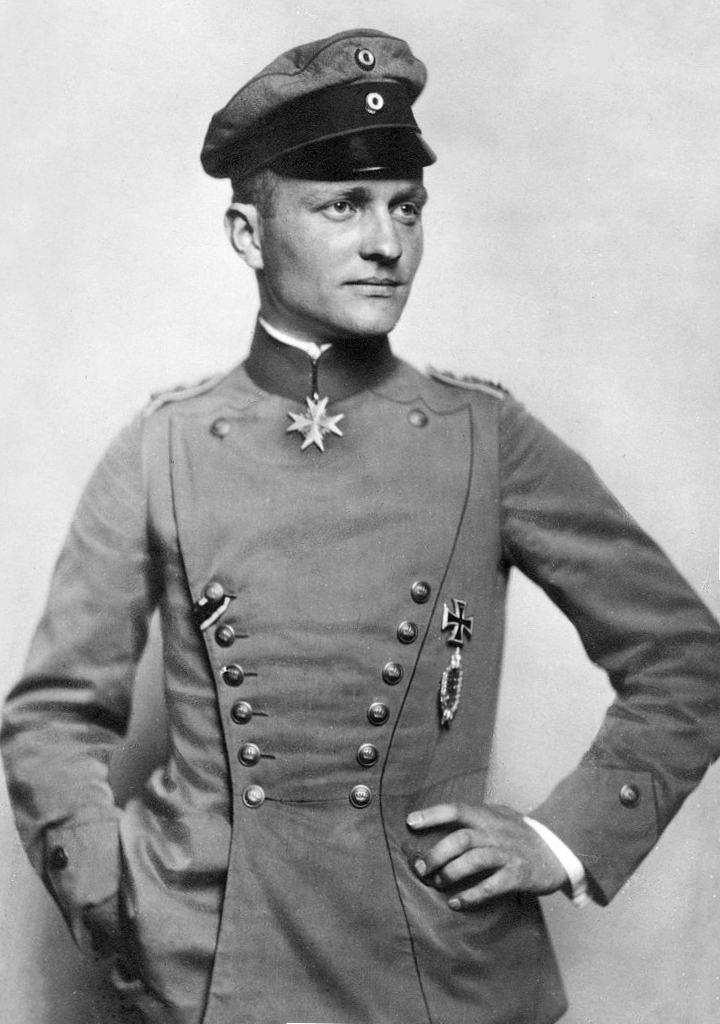
German war ace Manfred von Richthofen, the "Red Baron", is killed in action.

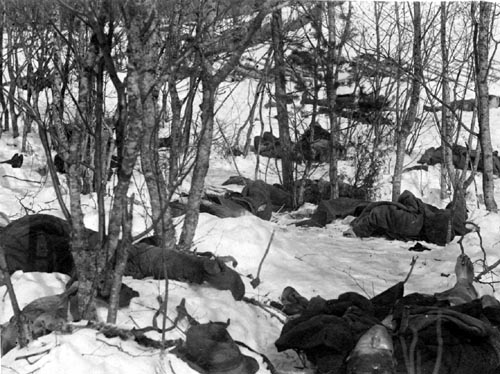
Bodies of Finnish Red Guards killed in the "Valley of Death" near Kuolemanlaakso, Finland following the Battle of Rautu.

The following events occurred in April 1918:

== April 1, 1918 (Monday) ==
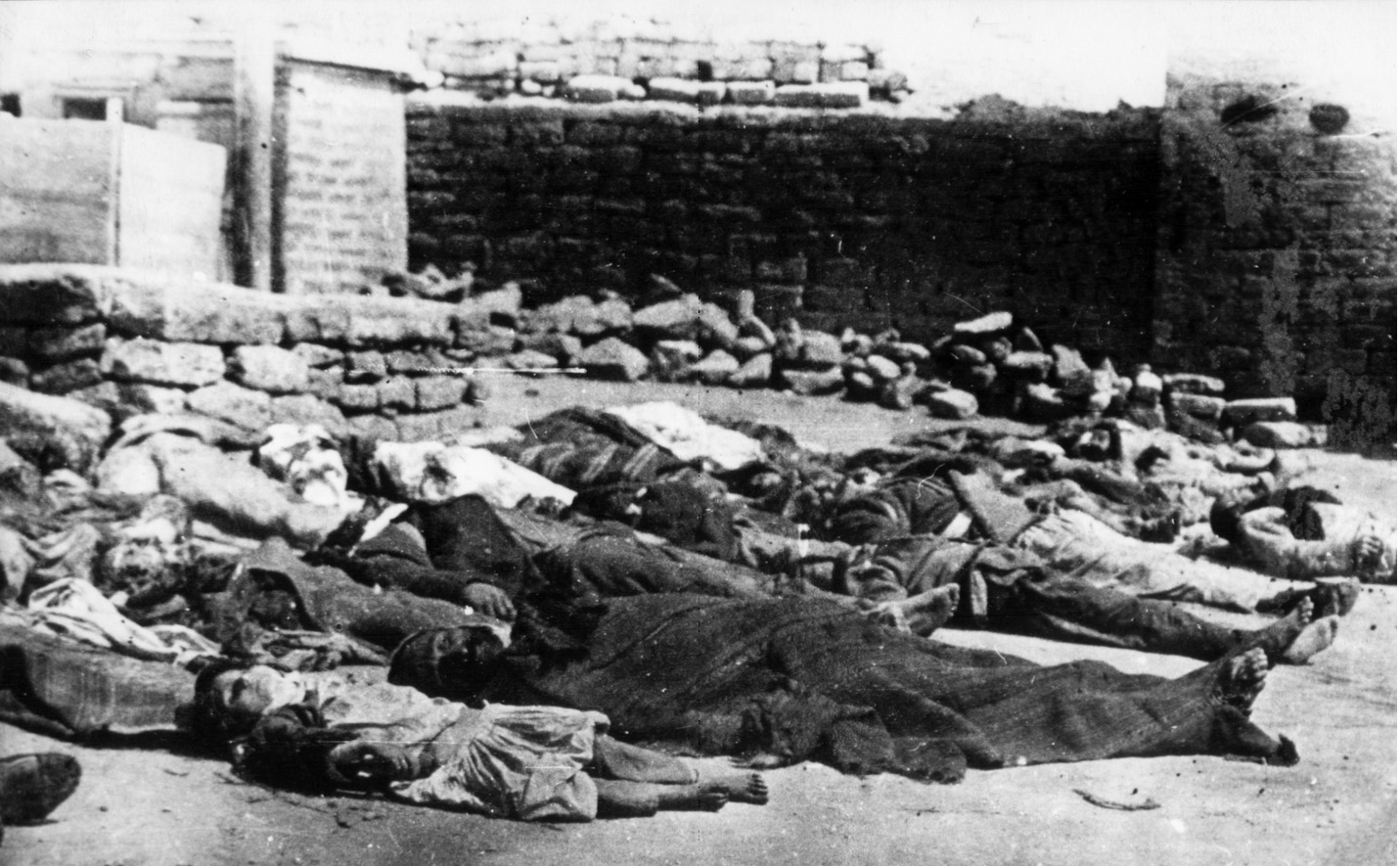
Bodies of Azerbaijanis killed in Baku during March Days.

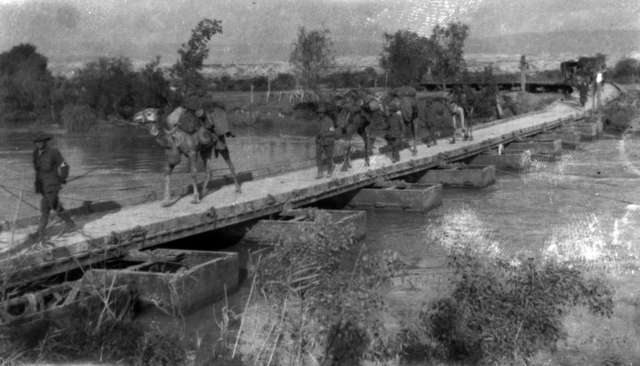
British medical troops crossing the Jordan River during the retreat following the first attack on Ottoman-held Jordan.

- The Royal Flying Corps and the Royal Naval Air Service merged to form the Royal Air Force, the first autonomous air force in the world.
  - The first Royal Air Force groups were established including No. 1, No. 2, No. 3, No. 7, No. 8, No. 9, No. 10, No. 11, No. 12, No. 13, No. 14, No. 15, No. 16, No. 19, and No. 22.
  - The Royal Air Force established air squadrons No. 150, No. 187, No. 205, No. 221, No. 222, and No. 227.
  - The Royal Air Force Police was established, with 500 officers and 20,000 non-commissioned officers in the force by the end of World War I.
- March Days – Soviet-Armenian forces bombarded Baku, Azerbaijan during a crackdown against a Musavat revolt in the city. By evening, a delegation from Musavat met and agreed to sign an ultimatum to order all those involved in the revolt to stand down if shelling ceased.
- During the British retreat from Jordan, the Wellington Mounted Rifles Regiment was attacked by locals from a nearby village. The ensuing firefight resulted in 18 casualties.
- Federal militia exchanged fire with armed protesters against conscription in Quebec City on Easter Monday, resulting in five deaths and hundreds of injuries. Total damages from the weekend of rioting were estimated at $300,000.
- Royal Navy destroyer HMS Falcon was cut in two by trawler in the North Sea during a routine convoy patrol. All crew were rescued although a crewman died from his injuries.
- Scottish shipbuilder Henry Robb formed his own shipbuilding company in Leith, Edinburgh, Scotland.
- Sapporo Agricultural College in Sapporo, Japan took the university-level agricultural program from Tohoku University, and was renamed Hokkaido University to reflect its new academic status as one of the nine Imperial Universities of Japan.
- The city of Capreol, Ontario was established and remained an independent community until 2002 when it was amalgamated with Sudbury.
- The Mama Parsi Girls Secondary School was established in Karachi, British India (now Pakistan).
- Born:
  - Utako Okamoto, Japanese medical researcher, discovered tranexamic acid which is now used to treat postpartum bleeding; in Tokyo, Empire of Japan (present-day Japan) (d. 2016)
  - Robert Thieme, American religious leader, leading pastor of Berachah Church; in Fort Wayne, Indiana, United States (d. 2009)
- Died:
  - Paul von Rennenkampf, 63, Russian army officer, commander of cavalry forces during the Boxer Rebellion and Russo-Japanese War, commander of the Russian First Army during World War I (executed) (b. 1854)
  - Isaac Rosenberg, 27, British poet, known for his poetry collection Poems from the Trenches; killed in action (b. 1890)

== April 2, 1918 (Tuesday) ==
- March Days – Fighting in Baku, Azerbaijan subsided as thousands of Muslims fled to the city of Elisabethpol. An estimated 12,000 civilians in Baku, mostly Muslim, were massacred over four days, while the Armenian forces reported 2,500 casualties.
- The British completed their withdrawal across the Jordan River following their failure to capture Amman, Jordan.
- Battle of Rautu – The White Guards cut off the rail line to Petrograd, preventing needed Russian ammo and equipment from reaching the Red Guards dug in south of Rautu, Finland.
- Victoria College in Stellenbosch, South Africa became Stellenbosch University.
- Värmlands Fotbollförbund was formed as part of the Swedish Football Association and now manages 138 member clubs in Värmland, Sweden.
- The borough of Califon, New Jersey was established using of the former townships of Lebanon and Tewksbury.
- Died: T. Allston Brown, 82, American journalist, known for theatrical criticism including History of the American Stage (b. 1836)

== April 3, 1918 (Wednesday) ==
- French military officer Ferdinand Foch was appointed commander-in-chief of the Allied forces.
- Finnish Civil War – The Baltic Sea Division, a force of 10,000 German soldiers assigned to fight in the Finland campaign, landed at Hanko and moved towards Helsinki and Lahti. In anticipation of the landing, the Imperial Russian Navy scuttled submarines AG-11, AG-12, and AG-16, along with Royal Navy submarines E1, E8, E9, E19, C26, C27, and C35.
- Battle of Tampere – An army of 16,000 White Guards launched a final offensive against a force of 1,400 Red Guards at Tampere, Finland after two weeks of bloody fighting, reaching the Tammerkoski River that divided the town in half.
- The People's Party of Romania was established by army officer and politician Alexandru Averescu.
- Born:
  - Sixten Ehrling, Swedish conductor, music director for the Royal Swedish Opera and principal conductor for the Detroit Symphony Orchestra; in Malmö, Sweden (d. 2005)
  - Oles Honchar, Ukrainian writer, promoter of re-establishing the Ukrainian language and culture in the Soviet Union, author of The Cathedral; as Oleksandr Terentiiovych Bilychenko, in Yekaterinoslav Governorate, Ukrainian People's Republic (present-day Ukraine) (d. 1995)

== April 4, 1918 (Thursday) ==
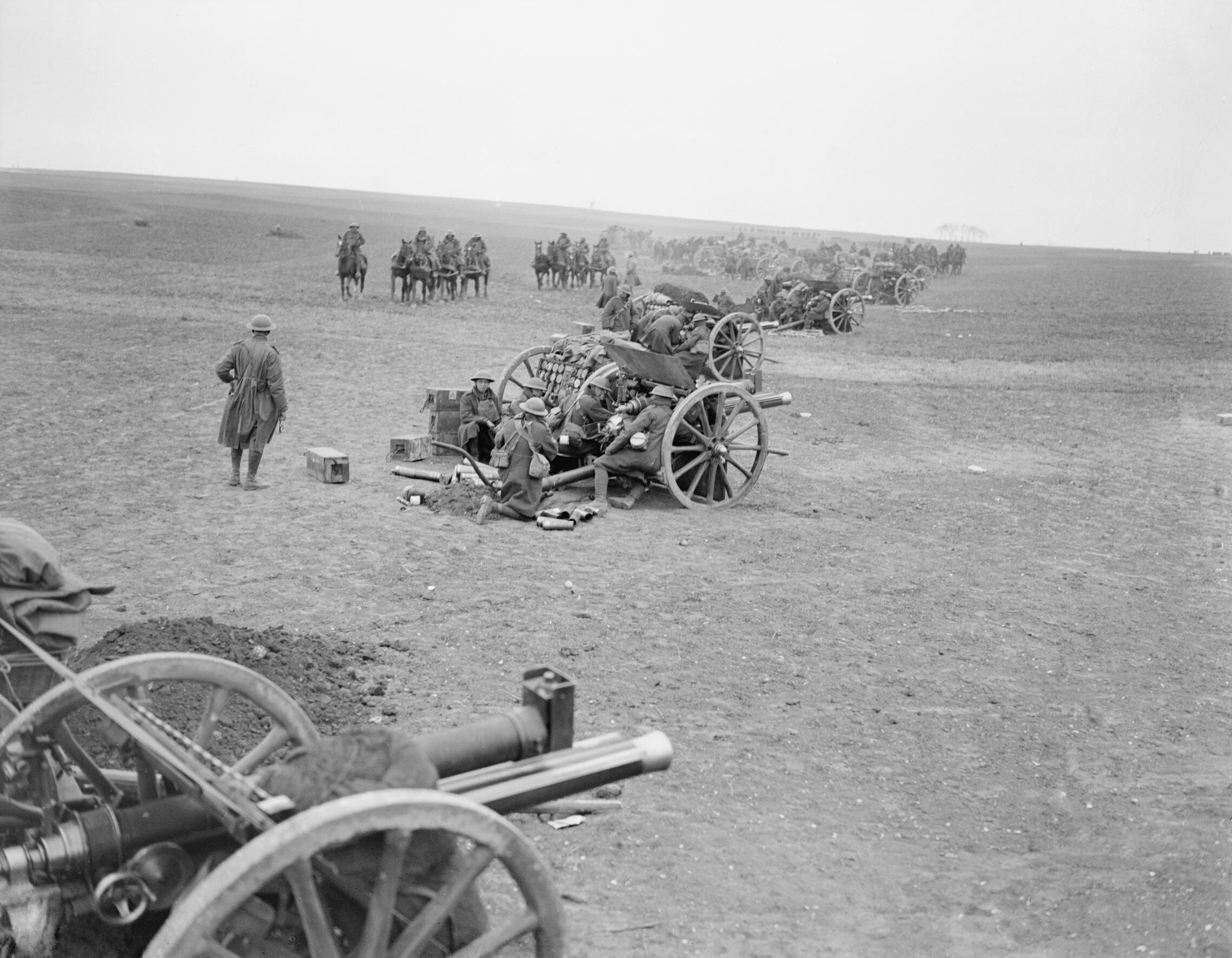
British artillery defend the Allied line during the Battle of the Avre in France.

- Operation Michael – German forces attacked Avre, France, to maintain the momentum of the Spring Offensive but were met with considerable resistance from British and Australian units. Meanwhile, they captured Le Hamel, Somme, France in an attempt to reach the strategic road and rail hub at Villers-Bretonneux. However, a surprise attack by the 36th Australian Battalion forced the Germans back.
- Battle of Tampere – The White Guards crossed the Tammerkoski River dividing Tampere, Finland and reached the western half of the town by the end of the day.
- Battle of Rautu – A force of 2,000 Finnish White Guards launched a second offensive against the Finnish Red Guards, who were running low of ammo and supplies.
- German and Ottoman forces began counterattacks against the British from Jordan.
- Royal Navy destroyer HMS Bittern sank after colliding with another ship in the English Channel, killing all 63 crew.
- German-born coal miner Robert Prager was lynched by a mob in Collinsville, Illinois during the height of anti-German sentiment in the United States. In May, a grand jury tried 12 men indicted in the lynching but found them innocent.
- The first two-seater aircraft, a Royal Air Force Sopwith Strutter, was launched from a platform mounted on a 12-inch (305-mm) gun turret of the battlecruiser HMAS Australia.
- The first edition of the Hebrew-language daily newspaper Haaretz was published, sponsored by the British military government in Palestine.
- The German ostmark currency was put into circulation.
- Born:
  - Joyce Ballantyne, American graphic artist, best known as the creator of the Coppertone girl; in Norfolk, Nebraska, United States (d. 2006)
  - Ian Cross, British air force officer, member of the escape from Stalag Luft III during World War II; in Cosham, England (d. 1944, executed)
  - George Jellicoe, British naval officer and politician, First Lord of the Admiralty from 1963 to 1964, Leader of the House of Lords from 1970 to 1973, son of John Jellicoe; in Hatfield, Hertfordshire, England (d. 2007)
- Died: Hermann Cohen, 75, German philosopher, one of the founders of the University of Marburg school that promoted Neo-Kantianism (b. 1842)

== April 5, 1918 (Friday) ==
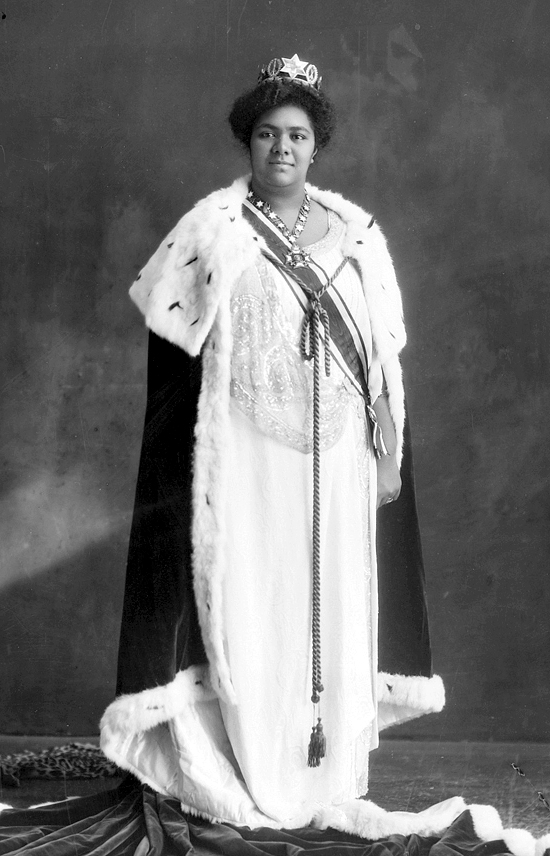
Queen Sālote of Tonga at her coronation.

- Operation Michael – British forces halted the German advance at Ancre, France, ending the first stage of the Spring Offensive. The offensive had cost the Allies some c. 255,000 men including 177,739 killed, British casualties. As well, the German captured 75,000 prisoners and some 1,300 artillery pieces. German casualties were also massive, with 250,000 casualties. Despite advancing more than 65 km (40 mi) and capturing 3,100 km2 (1,200 sq mi) of French territory, the offensive achieved few of the strategic objectives of the operation.
- Battle of Rautu – The Red Guards broke through the White Guard line and attempted to escape to Petrograd. However, the column was caught in a machine gun cross-fire in a valley near Kuolemanlaakso, Finland at the Russian-Finnish border, where 400 men were slaughtered along with dozens of civilians from the nearby village. Another 800 to 900 Red Guards were taken prisoner. The Whites Guards lost 270 casualties in the final two days of the battle. The Kuolemanlaakso valley was nicknamed the "Valley of Death" following the massacre.
- Battle of Tampere – The Red Guards barricaded in the town center of Tampere, Finland surrendered to the White Guards.
- Sālote Tupou became the first queen monarch of the Kingdom of Tonga, succeeding George Tupou upon his death, and remaining on the throne until her own death in 1965 in what was the longest reign for the South Pacific kingdom.
- Royal Air Force pilot Lieutenant C. H. Noble-Campbell of No. 38 Squadron was wounded in the head by machine-gun fire while attacking German Zeppelin L 62 but was able to return safely to base. It was the only occasion on which an attacking airman was wounded in combat with an airship.
- The American Bristol airplane was first flown.
- Died:
  - Andrew Van Vranken Raymond, 63, American religious leader and academic, president of Union College from 1894 to 1907 (b. 1854)
  - Paul Vidal de La Blache, 73, French geographer, considered the founder of modern French geography and geopolitics (b. 1845)

== April 6, 1918 (Saturday) ==
- Battle of Tampere – The last Red Guards surrendered at Tampere, Finland. Casualties varied for either side, with casualties for the White Guards ranging from 600 to 1,000 lost. Some accounts listed more than 1,200 Red Guards killed in action and another thousand executed following the battle. Another 11,000 prisoners were taken to a concentration camp.
- Finnish Civil War – Following a major defeat at Tampere, the Red Guard command ordered their soldiers, families and other civilian supporters to retreat to the eastern half of Finland and to form a new front at the Kymijoki River. By mid-April, 25,000 people loyal to the Red Guards along passed through the town of Hämeenlinna, Finland.
- Incumbent Archibald Peake, Premier of South Australia, defeated Leader of the Opposition Andrew Kirkpatrick in state elections.
- Born:
  - Alfredo Ovando Candía, Bolivian state leader, 48th President of Bolivia; in Cobija, Bolivia (d. 1982)
  - Peter Ebert, German opera director, best known for his works for the Glyndebourne Festival Opera and Scottish Opera; in Frankfurt, German Empire (present-day Germany) (b. 2012)
- Died:
  - John Q. A. Brackett, 75, American politician, 36th Governor of Massachusetts (b. 1842)
  - Orby, 13-14, Irish race horse, winner of the 1907 Epsom Derby and Irish Derby (b. 1904)

== April 7, 1918 (Sunday) ==
- Battle of the Lys – German forces launched the second stage of their Spring Offensive against the Allies on the Western Front, beginning massive artillery shelling on Lys, France.
- Finnish Civil War – Germany landed a detachment force of 3,000 troops at Loviisa, Finland to aid the White Guards.
- The German submarine UB-53 sighted German Zeppelin L 59 catching fire accidentally and crashing into the sea near the Strait of Otranto with the loss of all hands. The airship was on the outbound leg of a flight from Yambol, Bulgaria, in an attempt to bomb the Royal Navy base at Malta.
- Operations against the Marri and Khetran tribes in Balochistan ended with surrender to the British authorities.
- Born:
  - Bobby Doerr, American baseball player, second baseman for the Boston Red Sox from 1937 to 1951; as Robert Pershing Doerr, in Los Angeles, United States (d. 2017)
  - Moana-Nui-a-Kiwa Ngarimu, Māori soldier, recipient of the Victoria Cross for action during the North African campaign; in Whareponga, New Zealand (d. 1943, killed in action)
  - John Call Cook, American geologist, developed ground-penetrating radar for field research; in Afton, Wyoming, United States (d. 2012)

== April 8, 1918 (Monday) ==
- The first raid was conducted by United States Army's Aviation Section, the forerunner of the United States Army Air Service.
- U.S. President Woodrow Wilson established the National War Labor Board, with former U.S. President William Howard Taft and Frank P. Walsh as co-chairs, as an agency to mediate labor disputes in the United States during World War I.
- Japanese energy company Tokai Carbon was established in Tokyo.
- Born:
  - Robert Marshall Cowell, British air force medical officer and race driver, later Roberta Cowell, first British trans woman to undergo sex reassignment surgery; in London, England (d. 2011)
  - Betty Ford, American social leader, First Lady of the United States during the presidency of Gerald Ford, co-founder of the Betty Ford Center, recipient of the Presidential Medal of Freedom; as Elizabeth Anne Bloomer, in Chicago, United States (d. 2011)

== April 9, 1918 (Tuesday) ==
- The Moldavian Democratic Republic (originally Bessarabia) voted to become part of Romania.
- Battle of the Lys – After two days of shelling the Allied line, the German Sixth Army broke through its defenses and reached Estaires, France, before British reserve divisions halted their advance.
- Finish composer Leevi Madetoja lost his brother Yrjö Madetoja during the Battle of Antrea, presumably captured and killed by the Finnish Red Guards during fighting around Kavantsaari. Madetoja later composed a three-movement piano suite titled The Garden of Death for the memory of his lost brother.
- Born:
  - Jørn Utzon, Danish architect, designer of the Sydney Opera House; in Copenhagen, Denmark (d. 2008)
  - William T. Moore, American politician, member of the Texas Senate from 1949 to 1981; in Wheelock, Texas, United States (d. 1999)
- Died:
  - Niko Pirosmani, 55, Georgian painter, best known for representing daily Georgian life through oilcloth (b. 1862)
  - Charles Fleetford Sise, 83, American-Canadian business leader, first president of Bell Telephone Company and board director for Northern Electric and Manufacturing Company (b. 1834)

== April 10, 1918 (Wednesday) ==
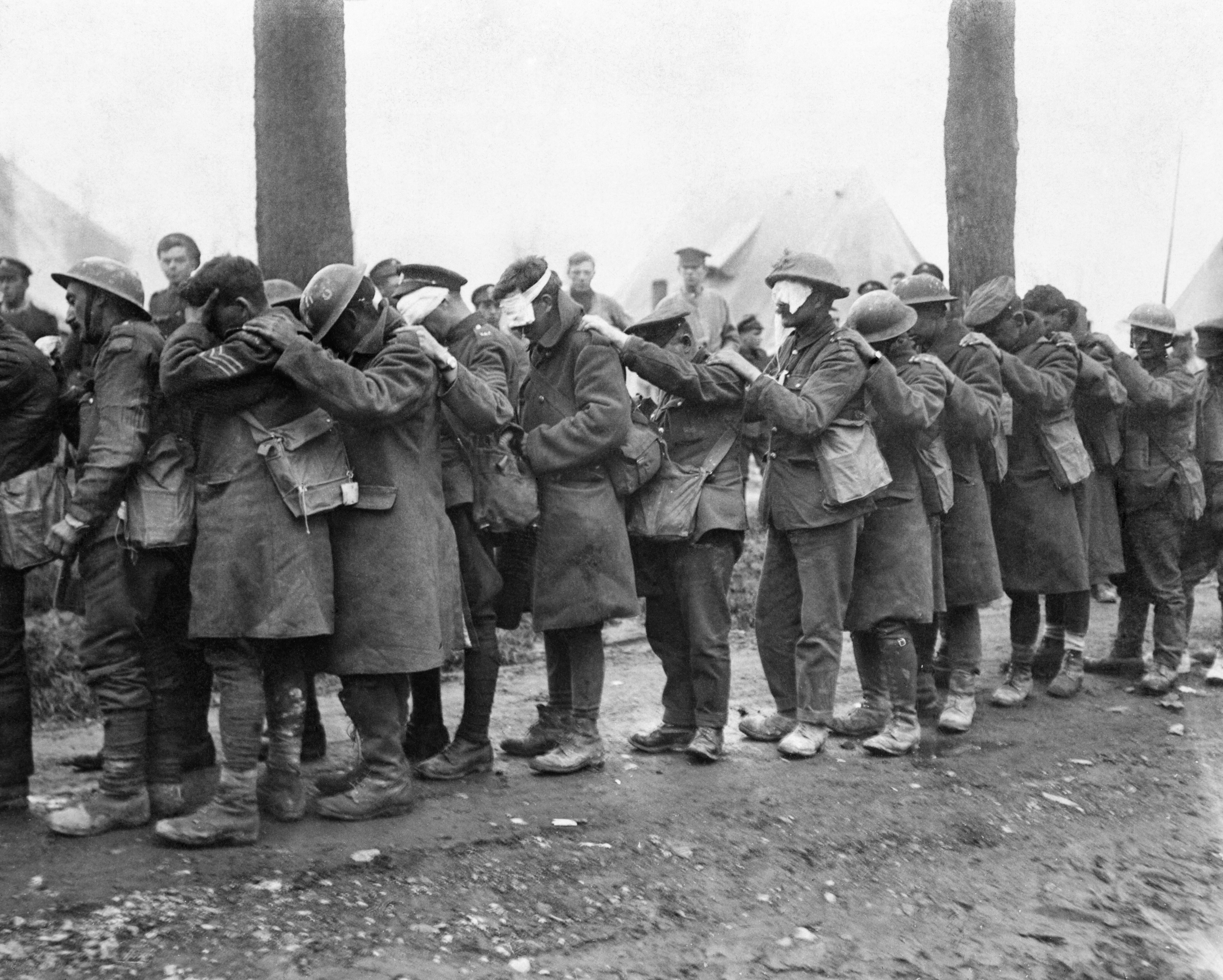
British troops blinded by poison gas line up for treatment during the Battle of the Lys.

- Battle of the Lys – The Allies prevented the German Sixth Army from breaking out of Estaires, France, before British reserve divisions halted their advance, while the German Fourth Army captured Messines in West Flanders, Belgium.
- Battle of Ahvenkoski – The German detachment force of 800 soldiers retreated west of Ahvenkoski, Finland under the mistaken assumption the Red Guards had superior numbers at Kotka. Instead, the Finnish force of roughly 500 dug into positions on the Kymijoki River until reinforcements arrived.
- Born:
  - Cornell Capa, Hungarian-American photographer, known for work through Magnum Photos and Life magazine, brother to photographer Robert Capa; as Kornél Friedmann, in Budapest, Austria-Hungary (present-day Hungary) (d. 2008)
  - Betty Tebbs, British activist, leading advocate of women's rights and peace campaigns in the United Kingdom, chair of the National Assembly of Women in 1978; in Bury, England (d. 2017)
  - Jim Daniell, American football player, offensive tackle for the Ohio State Buckeyes football team from 1938 to 1942, and defensive tackle for the Chicago Bears and Cleveland Browns from 1945 to 1946; as James Lachlan Daniell, in Pittsburgh, United States (d. 1983)

== April 11, 1918 (Thursday) ==
- Battle of the Lys – With the British situation on the Western Front looking dire, British commanding officer General Douglas Haig issued a general order for troops to keep fighting "with our backs to the wall and believing in the justice of our cause" to protect "the safety of our homes and the freedom of mankind".
- A force of 5,000 Soviet troops under direction by Cheka stormed the main headquarters of the Black Guards, an anarchist group led by revolutionary leader Nestor Makhno, in Moscow. The raid only hastened armed response, allowing Makhno to form the Revolutionary Insurgent Army of Ukraine later that summer.
- The Ottoman Army consolidated all its forces opposing the British around the Jordan River.
- German troops with the Baltic Sea Division forced the Red Guards out of Espoo, Leppävaara, Finland, opening the main road to Helsinki.
- German submarine SM UB-33 struck a mine and sank in the Strait of Dover with all 28 crew lost.
- German battleship SMS Rheinland ran aground at the Åland Islands of Sweden with the loss of two crew. She was salvaged and returned to service in May.
- Royal Navy cruiser HMS King Alfred was torpedoed and damaged by German submarine SM UB-86 in the Atlantic Ocean, with one crew member killed. She was repaired in Liverpool and returned to service.
- Born: Frank Hassett, Australian army officer, Chief of the Defence Force from 1975 to 1977, recipient of the Order of Australia, Order of the British Empire, and Order of the Bath; as Francis George Hassett, in Marrickville, New South Wales, Australia (d. 2008)
- Died:
  - Otto Wagner, 76, Austrian architect and urban planner, chief designer of cityscape in Vienna (b. 1841)
  - Eugène Baudin, 64, French revolutionary leader, member of the Paris Commune in 1871 (b. 1853)
  - William C. McDonald, 59, American politician, first Governor of New Mexico (b. 1858)

== April 12, 1918 (Friday) ==
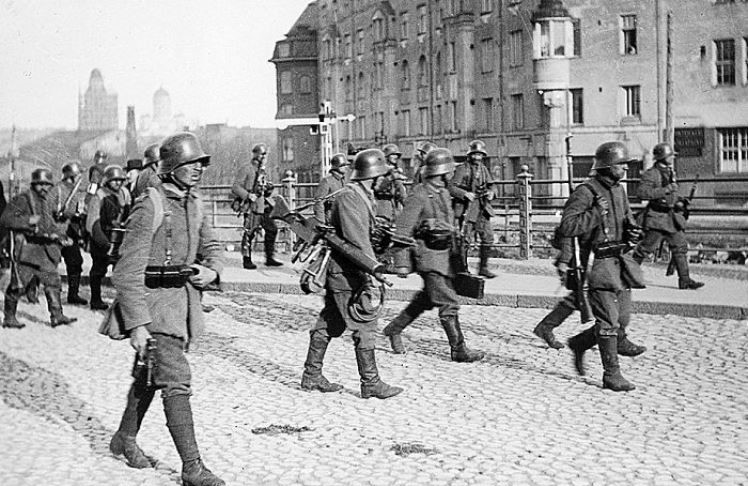
German troops mobilizing during the Battle of Helsinki.

- Battle of the Lys – The German Sixth Army pushed towards Hazebrouck, France, and captured Merville.
- Battle of Helsinki – German commander Rüdiger von der Goltz ordered his troops to attack the Red Guard-held city of Helsinki. Some 500 troops with the Baltic Sea Division were dispatched to Tikkurila to capture the Helsinki–Riihimäki railway and prevent any means of escape from Helsinki while the main body entered the northern suburbs of the city.
- An assembly of Baltic Germans passed a resolution to call upon the German Empire to recognize a collection of Baltic states as monarchy called the United Baltic Duchy with the capital being Riga. However, the recognition did not come until September 22, and the German Revolution permanently stopped any chance of forming a nation.
- Captain Henry Woollett of the Royal Air Force's No. 43 Squadron scored six victories in two sorties, including shooting down five German Albatros fighter planes.
- Born: Harrison Thyng, American air force officer, commander of the 4th Fighter Wing during the Korean War, five-time recipient of the Distinguished Flying Cross, 33 Air Medals, three Silver Stars, two Legion of Merit medals; in Laconia, New Hampshire, United States (d. 1983)

== April 13, 1918 (Saturday) ==
- Battle of the Lys – The First Australian Division halted the German Sixth Army advance towards Hazebrouck, France.
- Battle of Helsinki – German forces attacked the main headquarters of the Red Guards in Helsinki and completed their capture of the city. Some 4,000 to 6,000 Red Guards were captured and another 400 were killed in fighting. Some 10,000 supporters also fled the city.
- Soviet Russia established the Baku Commune under the leadership of Stepan Shaumian in Baku, Azerbaijan.
- Died:
  - Thomas Fremantle, 88, British rail executive, chairman of London, Brighton and South Coast Railway from 1868 to 1908 (b. 1830)
  - Lavr Kornilov, 47, Russian army officer, leading figure in the Kornilov affair; killed in action at Ekaterinodar, Kuban Soviet Republic during the Russian Civil War (b. 1870)

== April 14, 1918 (Sunday) ==
- The Finnish White Guards executed 99 out of 169 foreign prisoners at a prisoner camp at Joensuu, Finland.
- The Zionist Commission arrived in Palestine.
- The municipality of Catanduva, São Paulo, Brazil was established.
- Born:
  - Mary Healy, American actress and singer, best known for her collaboration with husband Peter Lind Hayes on 1950s TV variety shows including Star of the Family; in New Orleans, United States (d. 2015)
  - George McGill, Canadian air force officer, member of the escape team from the German POW camp Stalag Luft III; in Toronto, Canada (d. 1944, executed)
  - John Norton, American army officer, commander of the 1st Cavalry Division during the Vietnam War, four-time recipient of the Distinguished Service Medal and Legion of Merit, Silver Star, Air Medal and Bronze Star Medal; in Fort Monroe, Virginia, United States (d. 2004)
- Died: William J. Stone, 69, American politician, 28th Governor of Missouri, U.S. Senator from Missouri from 1903 to 1918 (b. 1848)

== April 15, 1918 (Monday) ==
- Battle of the Lys – German forces captured Bailleul, forcing the British to entirely abandon Passchendaele, Belgium, and fall back to Ypres and the Yser Canal.
- The United States Navy established a naval station on White's Island, Bermuda. It was closed the following year after World War I ended.
- The New York City Subway system opened stations at Bedford Park, Mosholu Parkway and Woodlawn for the IRT Jerome Avenue Line.
- Born: Louis O. Coxe, American poet and playwright, known for poetry collections including Passage and The North Well, and his dramatic adaptation of the Herman Melville novel Billy Budd; in Manchester, New Hampshire, United States (d. 1993)

== April 16, 1918 (Tuesday) ==
- Born:
  - Spike Milligan, British-Irish comedian, noted member of The Goon Show; as Terence Alan Milligan, in Ahmednagar, British India (present-day India) (d. 2002)
  - Roger Mirams, New Zealand-Australian filmmaker, known for films Broken Barrier and children's television series The Lost Islands and Secret Valley; in Christchurch, New Zealand (d. 2004)
  - Gholam Ali Oveissi, Iranian military officer, last Chief Commander of the Imperial Iranian Armed Forces before the Iranian Revolution; in Qom, Guarded Domains of Iran (present-day Iran) (d. 1984, assassinated)

== April 17, 1918 (Wednesday) ==
- Battle of the Lys – The German Fourth Army attacked Kemmelberg, a strategic hill in West Flanders, Belgium, between Armentières and Ypres.
- German submarine SM UB-82 was depth-charged and sunk in the Irish Sea by two Royal Navy ships with the loss of all 32 crew.
- The town of Cheverly, Maryland was established.
- Born:
  - William Holden, American actor, known for leading roles in Sunset Boulevard, The Bridge on the River Kwai, The Wild Bunch and Network, recipient of the Academy Award for Best Actor for Stalag 17; as William Franklin Beedle Jr., in O'Fallon, Illinois, United States (d. 1981)
  - Anne Shirley, American actress, best known for portraying Anne of Green Gables in a series of films in the 1930s; as Dawn Evelyn Paris, in New York City, United States (d. 1993)
  - Frank Popper, Czech-British historian, leading expert on the history of technology and its influence on art; in Prague, Austria-Hungary (present-day Czech Republic) (d. 2020)

== April 18, 1918 (Thursday) ==
- Battle of the Lys – The German Sixth Army attacked Béthune, France but were repulsed.
- The Military Service Bill, which included conscription in Ireland, became law. A conference of nationalist parties, Sinn Féin and labour movements met in Dublin to organize a nation-wide opposition to conscription.
- Born:
  - Gabriel Axel, Danish filmmaker, known for films including Hagbard and Signe, recipient of the Academy Award for Best Foreign Language Film for Babette's Feast; as Axel Gabriel Erik Mørch, in Aarhus, Denmark (d. 2014)
  - Clifton Hillegass, American publisher, founder of CliffsNotes; in Rising City, Nebraska, United States (d. 2001)
  - André Bazin, French film critic, co-founder of Cahiers du Cinéma; in Angers, France (d. 1958)
  - Claudio Teehankee, Filipino judge, 16th Chief Justice of the Philippines; in Manila, Philippine Islands (present-day Philippines) (d. 1989)
  - Harry Firth, Australian racing driver, four-time winner of the Bathurst 500 and the Australian Rally Championship in 1968; in Orbost, Australia (d. 2014)

== April 19, 1918 (Friday) ==
National flag of Lithuania

- Battle of the Lys – The German Fourth Army gave up on taking the Kemmelberg hill due to increasingly stiff British resistance.
- Finnish Civil War – German forces marched from Rautu, Finland to cut off the Red Guards connection to Russia.
- Battle of Lahti – A German detachment supporting the White Guards surprised the Red Guards at Lahti, Finland and captured the town with little resistance, since most forces had been mobilized to assume an offensive was to occur at the Red Guard stronghold of Kotka.
- German submarine SM UB-78 struck a mine and sank in the Strait of Dover with the loss of all 35 crew.
- Lithuania unveiled its national flag.
- Born: Vidal López, Venezuelan baseball player, outfielder and pitcher for clubs in the Mexican League, Cuban League, and Venezuelan League; in Río Chico, Venezuela (d. 1971)
- Died: William Hope Hodgson, 40, English writer, most known for the horror-fantasy novels The House on the Borderland and The Night Land, and the Sargasso Sea Stories series; killed in action at the Battle of the Lys (b. 1877)

== April 20, 1918 (Saturday) ==
- Battle of Lahti – German and White Guard forces met up at the harbor of Vesijärvi Lake as Red Guards in the region surrendered.
- German flying ace Manfred von Richthofen shot down and killed British ace Richard Raymond-Barker, making him the 80th and final kill for the notorious "Red Baron". Richthofen would be killed himself the following day.
- The Mikawa Railway extended the Mikawa Line in the Aichi Prefecture, Japan with station Mikawa Takahama serving the line.
- Giacomo Puccini completed the first draft of Gianni Schicchi, in what turned out to be his last opera.
- Born:
  - Edward L. Beach Jr., American naval officer, leading submarine commander during World War II and the Cold War including the USS Triton, author of Run Silent, Run Deep, recipient of the Navy Cross and Legion of Merit; in New York City, United States (d. 2002)
  - Kai Siegbahn, Swedish physicist, recipient of the Nobel Prize in Physics for his work in laser spectroscopy; in Lund, Sweden (d. 2007)
  - June Storey, Canadian-born American actress, leading lady to Gene Autry; as Mary June Storey, in Toronto, Canada (d. 1991)
- Died:
  - Karl Ferdinand Braun, 67, German physicist, recipient of the Nobel Prize in Physics for inventing the cathode-ray tube (b. 1850)
  - Paul Gautsch von Frankenthurn, 67, Austrian state leader, 14th, 19th and 23rd President of Austria (b. 1851)
  - Alexandre Liautard, 83, French-American veterinarian, founder of the American Veterinary Medical Association (b. 1835)

== April 21, 1918 (Sunday) ==
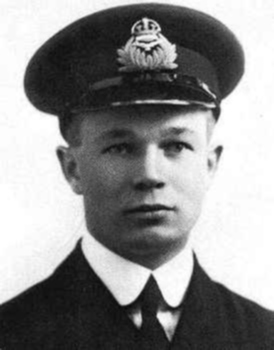
RAF pilot Roy Brown, credited for shooting down "The Red Baron".

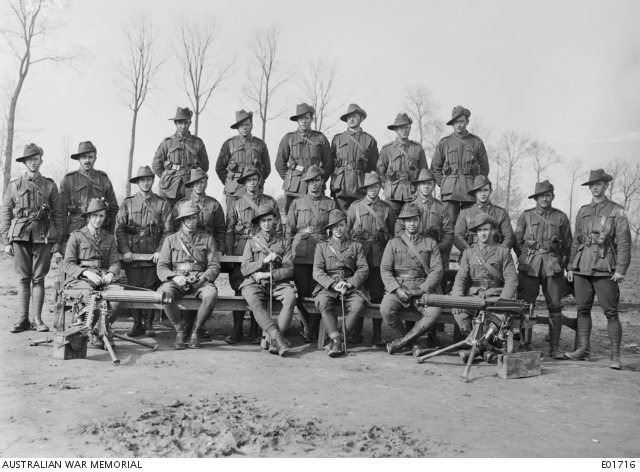
Sergeant Cedric Popkin (second right, middle row) with his artillery unit, also credited for shooting down "The Red Baron".

- An earthquake shook southern California, causing $200,000 in damage, one death, and several injuries.
- Battle of Lahti – Around 1,000 Red Guard reinforcements from Hollola, Finland were dispatched to recapture Lahti, Finland. German forces pushed them back, killing 37 Red Guards and taking another 500 prisoner. A further 300 supporters were arrested in the village over the next three days.
- German submarine SM UB-71 was depth-charged and sunk in the Strait of Gibraltar by a Royal Navy ship with the loss of all 32 crew.
- German flying ace Manfred von Richthofen, better known as "The Red Baron", died at Morlancourt Ridge near the Somme River after he was fatally wounded by a single bullet fired on his plane while he pursued Canadian pilot Wop May over the battlefield. Historians debated who fired the fatal shot, with May's commanding squadron leader Roy Brown given official credit since he flew to May's rescue and fired on von Richthofen's plane. However, contemporary analysis of von Richthofen's autopsy suggested the fatal shot more than likely came from ground fire, with Australian artillery gunners Sergeant Cedric Popkin, Snowy Evans or Robert Buie as the ones who actually downed "The Red Baron". The German war ace's record total of 80 victories was only exceeded by French ace René Fonck, who although was only credited with 75 kills, claimed 142. France's criteria for a "kill" required a third party to witness the crash and "out of control" kills did not count meaning he could have possibly shot down 67 planes out of control. Only six of them needed to crash to overtake Richthofen and since planes that are driven out of control usually crash, it is almost certain he scored significantly higher than the Red Baron.
- The United States Army established the First Corps Observation Group for air warfare over the Western Front.
- The Confederate Mothers Monument was unveiled publicly in Texarkana, Texas by the Texas chapter of the United Daughters of the Confederacy, among several funded and unveiled by the organization in the late 1910s.
- Died: Antonio Pini-Corsi, 58, Italian opera singer, known for his performances in operas such as Falstaff and La bohème (b. 1859)

== April 22, 1918 (Monday) ==
- Armenia, Azerbaijan, and Georgia together declared their independence from Russia as the Transcaucasian Democratic Federative Republic.
- Germany returned all of the Imperial Russian Navy Baltic Fleet ships that were in Helsinki when it was captured to Soviet Russia under the terms of the Treaty of Brest-Litovsk.
- Women in Denmark were allowed to vote for the first time in elections. The Venstre Party won a majority in the Folketing (Danish Parliament), with voter turnout at 75 percent.
- Battle of Lahti – Artillery with the Red Guards shelled German defenses in Lahti, Finland in a desperate attempt to retake the town.
- Battle of Ahvenkoski – German soldiers launched an attack on the Red Guards at Ahvenkoski, Finland.
- German submarine SM UB-55 struck a mine and sank in the Strait of Dover with the loss of 23 of her 29 crew.
- In a remarkable gesture of respect to an enemy combatant, the No. 3 Squadron of the Australian Flying Corps under direction of Major David Blake held a military funeral for German war ace Manfred von Richthofen after the unit was given responsibility for the German air force officer's body. He was buried initially in a cemetery at the village of Bertangles, near Amiens, France, but interred a few years later in the war cemetery of Fricourt. In 1925, his family claimed the body and returned it to Berlin.
- Born:
  - Mickey Vernon, American baseball player, first baseman for the Washington Senators, Cleveland Indians, Boston Red Sox and other teams from 1939 to 1960; as James Barton Vernon, in Marcus Hook, Pennsylvania, United States (d. 2008)
  - William Jay Smith, American poet, 19th United States Poet Laureate; in Winnfield, Louisiana, United States (d. 2015)
  - Bruno Mussolini, Italian air force officer, member of Regia Aeronautica during World War II, son of Benito Mussolini; in Milan, Kingdom of Italy (present-day Italy) (d. 1941, killed in a plane crash)

== April 23, 1918 (Tuesday) ==
- Guatemala declared war on Germany.
- The Royal Navy attempted to seal off U-boat bases at the German ports of Zeebrugge and Ostend by scuttling warships HMS Brilliant, HMS Iphigenia, HMS Sirius, HMS Thetis, and submarine HMS C3. The Royal Navy also lost destroyer HMS North Star from on-shore German shelling.
- A general strike was held against conscription in Ireland.
- Finnish Civil War – German forces captured the Riihimäki–Saint Petersburg railway, severing the Red Guards ties to Russia. The Red Guards general staff ordered all units that could not get over the Russian border to retreat to Vyborg.
- Battle of Antrea – After weeks of trench warfare between Vyborg and Antrea, the White Guards managed to gather 15,000 soldiers for an offensive against the Red Guards. The attack encircled the Red Guard force at Heinjoki and cut them off from Vyborg.
- Lieutenant Paul Frank Baer shot down his fifth aircraft, becoming the first flying ace of the American Expeditionary Forces.
- Born:
  - Maurice Druon, French writer, known for novels The Possessors and The Accursed Kings series; in Paris, France (d. 2009)
  - Margaret Avison, Canadian poet, two-time recipient of the Governor General's Awards for poetry collections including Concrete and Wild Carrot and Winter Sun; in Galt, Ontario, Canada (d. 2007)
  - Gordon Hirabayashi, American sociologist and activist, opponent of the internment of Japanese Americans during World War II; in Seattle, United States (d. 2012)
- Died: Paul Sébillot, 75, French painter and author, known for his work depicting life in Brittany, France (b. 1842)

== April 24, 1918 (Wednesday) ==
- Second Battle of Villers-Bretonneux – The German Second Army, using tanks and mustard gas, launched a second attack on Villers-Bretonneux, France, defeating the 8th British Infantry Division defending the town. During the battle, a trio of German A7Vs engaged three British Mark IV tanks in what was the first tank battle in history.
- Battle of Viipuri – German units attempted to invade the town of Vyborg, Finland held by the Red Guards but failed to break through. Meanwhile, the White Guards encircled the city and cut off all major escape routes.
- Women on the Faroe Islands voted for the first time in elections, with the New Self-Government winning a majority in the island country's parliament.
- The ultra-conservative Reformed Political Party was established to counter growing women's suffrage in the Netherlands.
- The influx of British Indian cavalry from the Western Front into the ranks of the Egyptian Expeditionary Force required extensive reorganization, leading to the Yeomanry Mounted Division being renamed the 1st Mounted Division and the 2nd Indian Cavalry Division renamed the 2nd Mounted Division reassigned.
- The Royal Air Force established air squadron No. 218.
- Born: Fred Gehrke, American football player, halfback for the Los Angeles Rams, San Francisco 49ers, and Chicago Cardinals from 1940 to 1950; as Clarence Fred Gehrke, in Salt Lake City, United States (d. 2002)

== April 25, 1918 (Thursday) ==
- Second Battle of Villers-Bretonneux – British and Australian forces counterattacked using tanks and recaptured Villers-Bretonneux, France.
- Battle of the Lys – German forces launched a second attack on Kemmelberg, France.
- Battle of Viipuri – The White Guards launched their own attack on the town but were also driven back by the Red Guard defenders.
- Battle of Antrea – The Red Guards surrendered and were allowed to pull back to Vyborg. Both sides lost an equal number of men, with total casualties in the battle at 624.
- Battle of Ahvenkoski – The Red Guards retreated across the Kymijoki River and destroyed the bridges behind them, forcing the Germans to dig on the opposite side.
- Finnish Civil War – German troops from the Baltic Sea Division blocked off the main road east Hämeenlinna, Finland, forcing 4,000 Red Guards and their supporters within the town to take a route north across the Alvettula River.
- German submarine SM U-104 was depth charged and sunk in St George's Channel by U.S. Navy ship USS Cushing with the loss of 41 of her 42 crew.
- Belgium's top-scoring ace, Willy Coppens, claimed his first victory.
- Austrian composer Franz Schreker premiered the opera The Branded at the Frankfurt Opera House, with Ludwig Rottenberg conducting.
- Born:
  - Astrid Varnay, Swedish-American opera singer, most known for her performances with the Metropolitan Opera and recordings of the Richard Wagner operas; as Ibolyka Astrid Maria Varnay, in Stockholm, Sweden (d. 2006)
  - Alain Savary, French politician, cabinet minister for the François Mitterrand administration; in Algiers, French Algeria (present-day Algeria) (d. 1988)
  - Muhammed Said Abdulla, Tanzanian writer, known for works in the Swahili language, author of Shrine of the Ancestors; in Makunduchi, Zanzibar (d. 1991)

== April 26, 1918 (Friday) ==
- Battle of the Lys – German forces captured Kemmelberg, Belgium.
- Finnish Civil War – Retreating Red Guards fought off White Guards as they attempted to cross the Alvettula River, losing 150 men. The group was forced to Hauho, Finland where they were joined by another 1,000 refugees.
- Canadian medical doctor Clarence M. Hincks and his American counterpart Clifford Whittingham Beers established the Canadian National Committee for Mental Hygiene (later renamed the Canadian Mental Health Association).
- Born:
  - Fanny Blankers-Koen, Dutch runner, four-time gold medalist at the 1948 Summer Olympics; as Francine Elsje Koen, in Lage Vuursche, Netherlands (d. 2004)
  - Miriam Ben-Porat, Belarusian-Israeli judge, first female judge of the Supreme Court of Israel; as Miriam Shinezon, in Vitebsk, Belarus (d. 2012)
  - Stafford Repp, best known for the role of Police Chief Clancy O'Hara in the 1960s Batman television series; in San Francisco, United States (d. 1974)

== April 27, 1918 (Saturday) ==
- Battle of Viipuri – The White Guards launched a second attack using better trained militia that proved more successful in piercing the Red Guard line around Vyborg.
- Finnish Civil War – A German unit of 400 men was dispatched to the village of Syrjäntaka, Finland before dispersing throughout the area, leaving only 150 soldiers in the village. A small unit of German soldiers and White Guards were sent to Hauho but were driven back with 50 casualties.
- The United States Department of War created the Division of Military Aeronautics responsible for the training of United States Army aviation personnel and units.
- Born: John Rice, American baseball umpire, officiated in four World Series; in Homestead, Pennsylvania, United States (d. 2011)
- Died: Jacques Duchesne, 81, French army officer, commander of French forces for the invasion of Madagascar during the Franco-Hova Wars (b. 1837)

== April 28, 1918 (Sunday) ==
- Battle of Lahti – The Red Guards launched a final attack on Lahti, Finland but the lack of order among the ranks allowed the experienced, disciplined German defenders to beat back the assault.
- Battle of Syrjäntaka – Bolstered by their victory at Hauho, the 4,000-strong Red Guard force marched on the village of Syrjäntaka held by the Germans and launched a night attack.
- Vyborg massacre – Members of the White Guards militia entered the town's prison and killed 30 prisoners alleged to be with the Red Guards, including Finnish parliamentarians Leander Ikonen and Matti Pietinen.
- The first elections were held in Portugal since Sidónio Pais staged a coup d'état in December. The elections were boycotted by the major opposition parties and as a result Pais and the National Republican Party won 108 of the 155 seats in the House of Representatives and 32 of the 73 seats in the Senate.
- The Central Council of Ukraine was dissolved after most of its members were imprisoned, executed or forced into exile by the Bolsheviks.
- Gavrilo Princip, assassin of Archduke Franz Ferdinand of Austria, died in Terezín, Austria-Hungary after three years in prison.
- The German-language newspaper Der Deutsche Correspondent in Baltimore was forced to cease publications due to rising anti-German sentiment during World War I.
- Born:
  - Karl-Eduard von Schnitzler, German journalist, host of East German news program The Black Channel; in Berlin, German Empire (present-day Germany) (d. 2001)
  - Elizabeth Nesta Marks, Irish-Australian biologist, leading expert on mosquito research including the discovery of 38 new species; in Dublin, Ireland (d. 2002)
  - Rodger Young, American soldier, recipient of the Medal of Honor for action during the New Georgia campaign in World War II; in Tiffin, Ohio, United States (d. 1943, killed in action)

== April 29, 1918 (Monday) ==
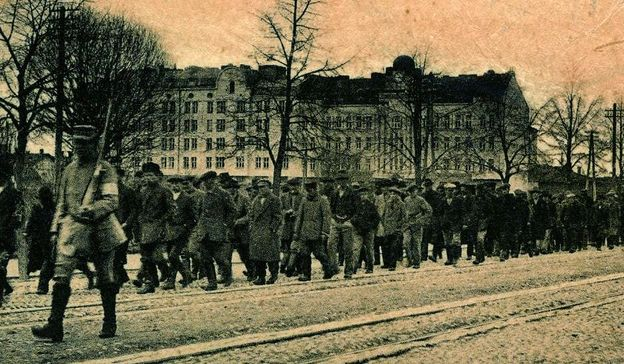
Finnish Red Guard prisoners are escorted following the Battle of Viipuri.

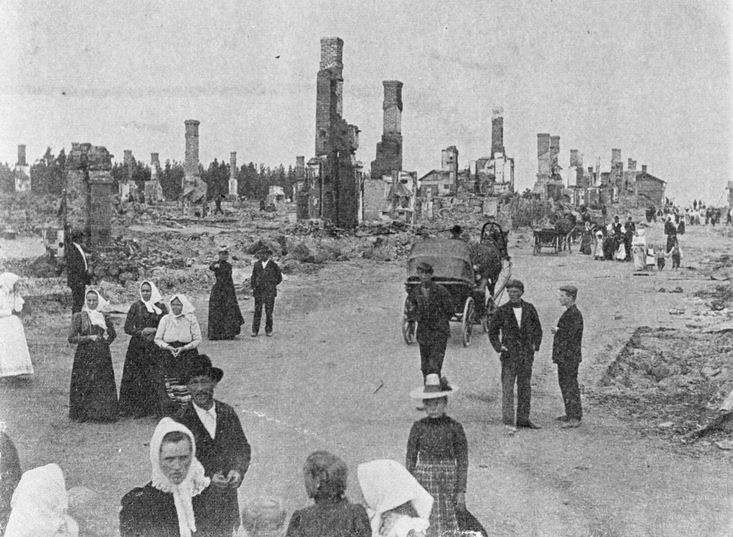
Civilians survey their destroyed neighbourhood following the Battle of Viipuri.

- Backed by the Imperial German Army, Ukrainian military officer Pavlo Skoropadskyi seized control of the Ukrainian People's Republic and set up the Hetman of Ukraine, leading to the creation of the Ukrainian State.
- Battle of the Lys – German forces attacked and captured Scherpenberg, a hill to the north-west of the Kemmelberg in France, ending the Battle of the Lys and the second phase of the Spring Offensive.
- Battle of Viipuri – The White Guards defeated the last Red Guard resistance and occupied Vyborg, Finland. Around 1,000 Red Guards broke through the line in a dash to the border, but most were captured and about half were shot dead during a massacre of prisoners and civilians that followed.
- Battle of Syrjäntaka – The Red Guard overwhelmed German forces at Syrjäntaka and forced them to retreat. However, the Germans were able to capture 150 Red Guards and hand them over to the White Guards, who executed many of them. It was last military victory for the Red Guards in the Finnish Civil War.
- American pilot Eddie Rickenbacker scored his first victory, shooting down a German Pfalz fighter near Baussant, France while flying a Nieuport fighter plane. He would become the top-scoring American ace of World War I.
- Born:
  - George Allen, American football coach, head of the Washington Redskins from 1971 to 1977, father to former Virginia Governor George Allen; in Nelson County, Virginia, United States (d. 1990)
  - Merv Harvey, Australian cricketer, batsman for the Australia national cricket team in 1947; as Mervyn Roye Harvey, in Broken Hill, Australia (d. 1995)
  - Richard MacNeish, American archaeologist, leading researcher into development of agriculture in pre-Columbian North America; in New York City, United States (d. 2001)
  - Nils Östensson, Swedish skier, silver and gold medalist at the 1948 Winter Olympics; in Transtrand, Sweden (d. 1949, killed in a motorcycle accident)

== April 30, 1918 (Tuesday) ==
- The Turkestan Autonomous Soviet Socialist Republic was established.
- The Taurida Soviet Socialist Republic was dissolved after German-backed Ukrainian forces invaded and occupied the entire peninsula.
- The Egyptian Expeditionary Force launched a second assault on Jordan, attacking the towns of Sunet Nimrun and Es Salt.
- Vyborg massacre – White Guards militia in Vyborg, Finland began executing Red Guard prisoners and civilians, mostly men, with ethnic ties to Russia.
- Battle of Lahti – German forces pushed the Red Guards out the village of Okeroinen, Finland near Helsinki, allowing them to encircle the main force at Hennala.
- German submarine SM UB-85 foundered in the Irish Sea off Belfast, with all 34 crew rescued by Royal Navy ship HMS Coreopsis.
- The Latvian Land Forces were established.
- Air force base Mather Field was established in Sacramento County, California.
- The football club Oranje Nassau Groningen was established in Groningen, Netherlands.
- Died: Eric Harper, 40, New Zealand rugby player, centre for The Original All Blacks and the New Zealand national rugby union team from 1904 to 1906; killed in action at Jerusalem (b. 1877)
