= Toini Mäkelä =

Finnish politician

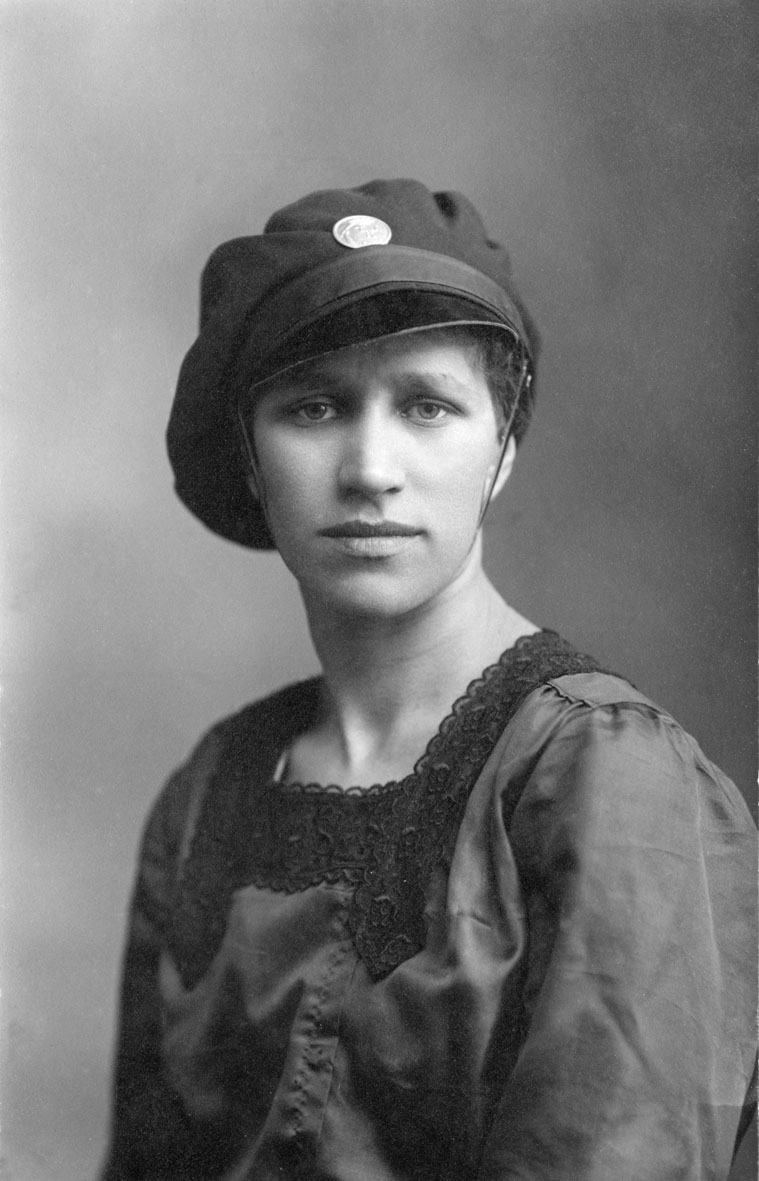
- Toini Mäkelä in the 1918 Finnish Civil War
- Born: October 10, 1895; Keuruu, Grand Duchy of Finland
- Died: November 1973 (aged 78) Moscow, Soviet Union
- Allegiance: Red Finland; Soviet Union Soviet Russia
- Service years: 1918–1921
- Conflicts: Finnish Civil War; Russian Civil War

Toini Maria Mäkelä (1895–1973) was a Finnish socialist revolutionary and military officer who fought in the Finnish and Russian Civil Wars and worked for the illegal Communist Party of Finland (SKP).

== Life ==
=== Early years ===
Toini Mäkelä was born to a peasant's family in Keuruu. Her father later worked as a railroad man in Savonlinna where Mäkelä attended an elementary school for two years. At the age of 19, Mäkelä moved to Vyborg, working as a maid, kitchen helper and waitress. After the outbreak of the Finnish Civil War in January 1918, Mäkelä joined the Red Guards. She became a leader of the female company fighting in the Battle of Antrea and the Battle of Valkjärvi. Following the Red defeat in the Battle of Vyborg, Mäkelä fled to the Soviet Russia.

=== Military career ===
Mäkelä settled Petrograd where she formed a female guard composed of 30 exiled Reds. In the winter of 1919, her unit fought the Finnish Aunus expedition in East Karelia. In December 1919, Mäkelä entered the Petrograd Red Officer School and joined the 7th Red Army fighting against the Whites. After the 1920 Kuusinen shooting Mäkelä took part on the hunt for the SKP opposition responsible for the murders. In April 1921, she graduated from the Red Officer School as a platoon leader and served in the Soviet Border Troops.

=== Party official ===
In the fall of 1921, Mäkelä was sent to Finland for underground work in the Communist Party. Under the alias ”Erna Mether” Mäkelä was the head of SKP's intelligence department until she was caught and sentenced for five years in prison. Mäkelä was released on parole in December 1926. As the party's underground operations were suppressed in 1929, Mäkelä joined the SKP office in Stockholm before moving permanently to the Soviet Union. In the 1930s, Mäkelä worked for the SKP foreign department in Moscow. She managed to survive the Great Purge where more than 30,000 Finns were killed. In 1941–1956, Mäkelä worked in the Finnish language service of Radio Moscow. She died in Moscow at the age of 78 in November 1973.
