= Battle of Syrjäntaka =

1918 battle of the Finnish Civil War

Coordinates: 61.116257°N 24.831663°E

- Part of the Finnish Civil War and Eastern Front in World War I
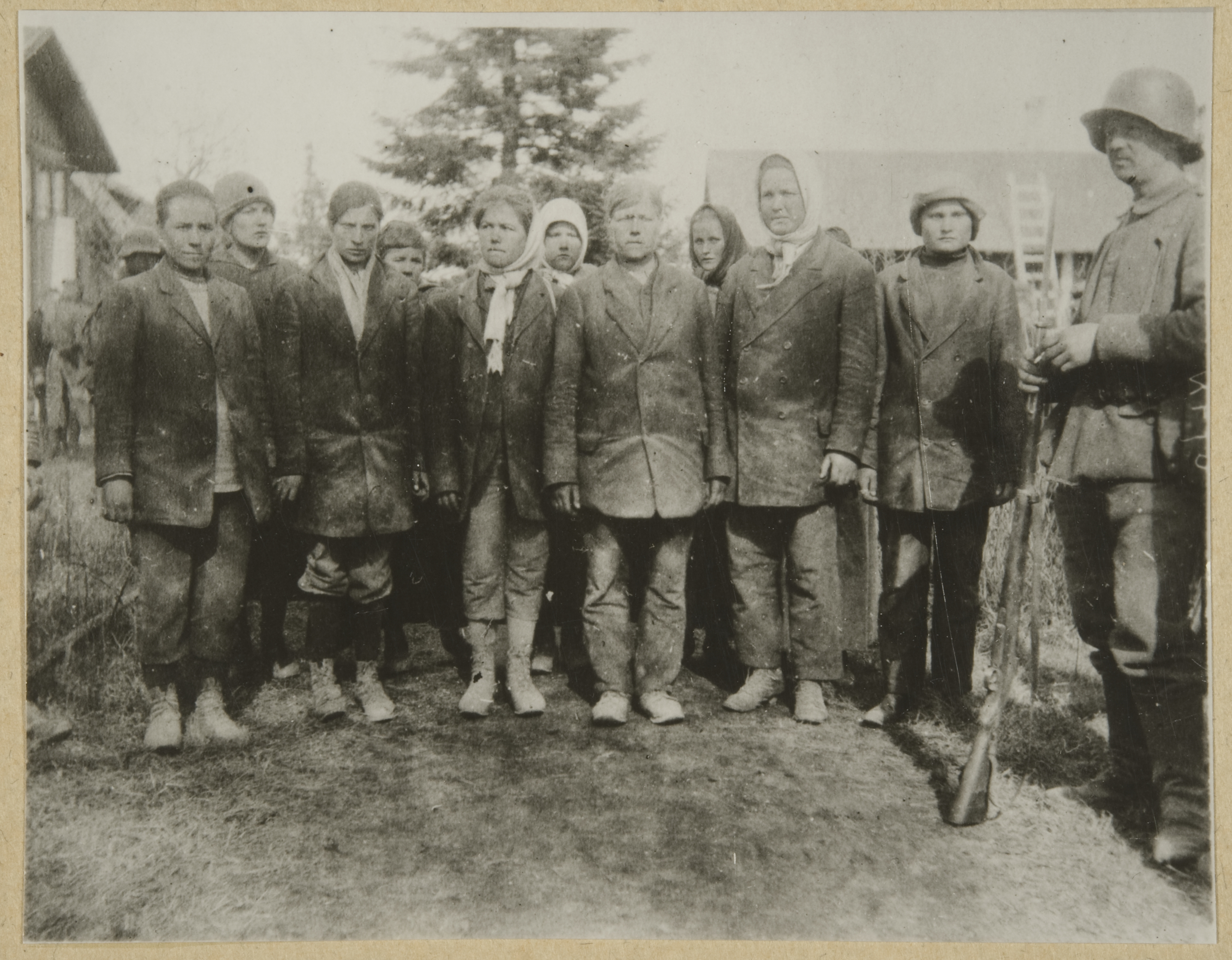
- Captured Red Guard women with a German carabinier
Date	28–29 April 1918 (1 day)
Location	Tuulos, Finland
Result	Red breakthrough

Belligerents
German Empire	Finnish Reds

Commanders and leaders
Godert von Reden	Unknown

Units involved
Baltic Sea Division	Red Guards

Strength
c. 400	c. 4,000–5,000

Casualties and losses
48 killed	c. 300 killed c. 150 captured

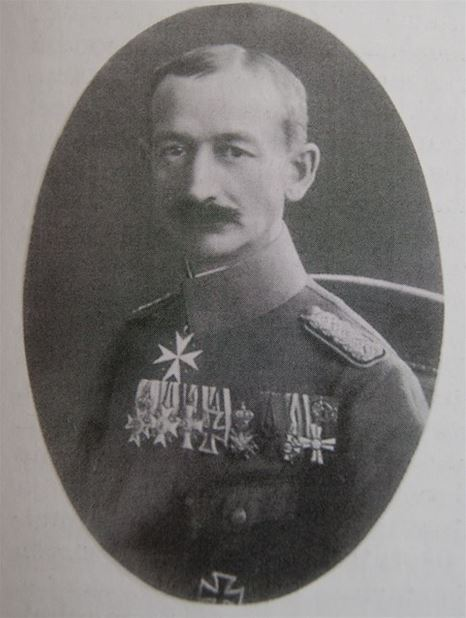
The German major Godert von Reden

Battle of Syrjäntaka was a 1918 Finnish Civil War battle fought on 28–29 April in Syrjäntaka, Tuulos, between the German Baltic Sea Division and the Finnish Red Guards. Thousands of Red refugees were fleeing east, while they were blocked by a small unit of Germans at a highway crossing in the small village of Syrjäntaka. After hours of desperate fighting, the Reds managed to break through and continue their journey. The Battle of Syrjäntaka and the preceding battle in Hauho were the only battles the Germans lost during their one-month military campaign in Finland. They were also the last Red victories of the 1918 civil war. The battle itself was totally unnecessary. It had no effect on the result of the war and neither side gained anything as the fleeing Reds were captured only a couple of days later.

== Background ==
After the city of Tampere had fallen on 6 April, the Red Guard general staff ordered their troops to retreat to the eastern part of Red controlled Finland in order to form a new front behind the river Kymijoki. The Reds first started fleeing from Tampere, Pori and Turku and were soon joined by Reds from the Helsinki area as the Germans took the city on 13 April. In the three weeks, tens of thousands of Red Guard fighters, their family members and other Red supporters were marching east. About 25,000 travelled through the town of Hämeenlinna in the southern part of Tavastia province. As the Germans were closing Hämeenlinna in 25–26 April, there was still up to 4,000 refugees in town. The road heading east from Hämeenlinna was now blocked, so the Reds had to make their way through a new route: first 30 kilometres north, then across the small river of Alvettula and back southwards to Hauho and Tuulos.

== Battles in Alvettula and Hauho ==
The Red column reached the Alvettula river, 30 kilometres north of Hämeenlinna, in the early morning of 26 April. The Finnish Whites were in defensive positions on the east side of the river with their machine guns aimed to the brigade. The Red artillery started firing at 5:00 am, but the Reds did not make their first effort to cross the river until the evening. After ten hours of fighting, they managed to cross the bridge in the next morning and finally made their way through the White lines in the afternoon. Nearly 150 Reds were killed as the Whites lost only 11 men. The column then headed 6 kilometres south to Hauho where the Reds stayed for the night. They were now joined by 1,000 more refugees who had come from the north.

At the same time, the Germans had taken Hämeenlinna. General major Konrad Theodor Wolf then sent a unit of 400 men to Syrjäntaka, a village and highway crossing 25 kilometres east of Hämeenlinna. The German unit was commanded by the major Godert von Reden. He was not aware of the approaching Reds and therefore did not expect any fighting. Reden decided to scatter his men to the nearby villages and finally there was only less than 150 men left in Syrjäntaka. Late in the evening of 27 April, two White officers informed Reden of the Reds in Hauho. For some reason, Reden then ordered an attack against the village. The operation was carried out early next morning with only one German bicycle company (Radfahr-Kompanie) and a small unit of Finnish Whites. The attack failed totally as the Reds stroke the enemy back, causing them nearly 50 dead while only 14 Reds were killed. After the battle, the Red column started marching towards Syrjäntaka, about 20 kilometres southeast of Hauho.

== Battle in Syrjäntaka ==
After being informed of the failure in Hauho, Reden realized his men were soon to face an overwhelming enemy. At 3:00 pm, Reden ordered his men to dig into defensive positions. The Germans formed a 1.5 kilometre-long line of trenches in the fields surrounding the village. Reden also called for additional forces and General major Wolf decided to send a unit of 200–300 men, under the command of major Lothar von Brandenstein. His troops never reached their destination as they were stuck in a fight with the Reds by the small lake of Pannujärvi, 3 kilometres west of Syrjäntaka.

The Reds reached Syrjäntaka at 9:00 pm. The artillery started pounding German positions and soon the Reds were attacking towards the enemy lines. A desperate blow after another was made through the night. The Red male fighters were joined by armed women and children. Finally at 5:00 am, Reden called his men to pull back. They were running out of ammunition and Reden had lost two-thirds of his men dead or wounded. The Germans retreated to the nearby lake Suolijärvi and set the village on fire to slow the Reds. Wooden buildings were now burning on the both sides of the road and the Germans watched the flames from the nearby hill. The Reds were now stopped for several hours, they could not proceed until the houses were burned out at 10:00 am. The column then marched through the village for the next six hours. It was 18 kilometres long, with at least 4,000–5,000 people, according to some sources even 10,000. As the Reds passed the village, they set the other side of the crossing on fire in order to prevent the Germans following them. However, the Germans managed to hit to the tail of the column and take 150 prisoners, including 30–40 fighters of the Valkeakoski Women's Guard who had a major role in the Battle of Alvettula. The women were handed to the Whites who took them to Hauho, where they were executed two days later. The Finnish doctor J. K. Klemola, who entered Syrjäntaka a day after the battle, described the sight as shocking; a piles of human bodies and dead horses lying around the smokey ruins of the burned village.

== Aftermath ==
As the Reds passed Syrjäntaka, they marched towards east for the next couple of days, but the Germans and Whites tightened their noose and up to 30,000 fleeing Reds were finally captured near the city of Lahti. They were gathered to the Fellman Concentration Camp after the Battle of Lahti was over on 1 May. Most of the women and children were soon sent back home, but some of them as well as the captured men were closed to prison camps around Southern Finland. The German commander Godert von Reden committed suicide in January 1919. The failures in Hauho and Syrjäntaka were most likely the main reasons for his suicide.

== Commemoration ==
The 11 Germans killed in the Pannujärvi area are buried in a common grave next to the present-day National Road 10 and the Pannujärvi industrial park. The rest of the Germans were laid to Hämeenlinna in the Tähtipuisto Park. In 1962 the bodies and the memorial were transferred to the Old Cemetery. 87 Reds, including two women, are buried in a mass grave in Syjäntaka. A memorial was finally erected in 1967. There is also several single graves around the woods between Hauho and Syrjäntaka, but burial sites of most of the killed Reds are unknown. The memorial of the battle was erected in the Pappilanmäki Hill of Syrjäntaka in 1968.

== In culture ==
Finnish authors Väinö Linna and Veijo Meri have both described the battle. It is featured in the second part of Linna's classic trilogy Under the North Star, and its film adaptation Here, Beneath the North Star, as one of the main characters is killed in the battle.
