= Hennala camp =

Concentration camp in Finland during 1918

- Concentration camp
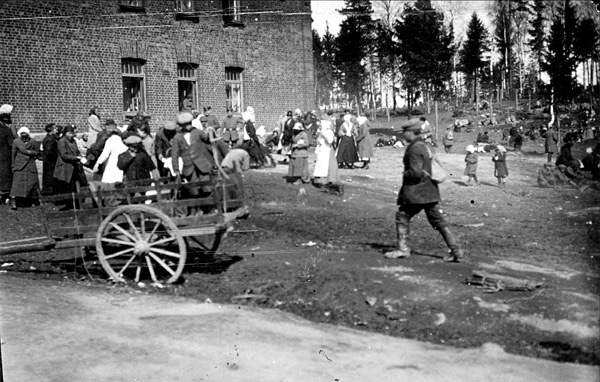
- Women inmates in Hennala.
- Coordinates: 60°58′05″N 25°37′20″E
- Location: Lahti, Finland
- Operated by: Finnish Whites
- Operational: May 1918 – 15 September 1918
- Inmates: Finnish Reds
- Number of inmates: 11,000–12,000
- Killed: c. 1,200
- Notable inmates: Ali Aaltonen †, Frans Myyryläinen, Fred Lindholm

Hennala camp was a concentration camp operating from the beginning of May 1918 to 15 September 1918 in the Hennala Garrison in Lahti, Finland. It was set up for the Reds captured by the White Army after the Finnish Civil War Battle of Lahti.

== History ==
As the Battle of Lahti was over on 1 May, the German troops and the Finnish Whites captured about 30,000 Reds in the surroundings of the town. Most of them were fleeing Reds from the southwest part of Finland on their way to the east. The refugees included Red Guard fighters, their family members and other Red supporters. As the captured were guarded by only one hundred Germans and a couple of Whites, about one third of them managed to escape. Finally, approximately 22,000 Reds were gathered to the shortly-lived Fellman camp, located in the fields of the Fellman Manor on the outskirts of Lahti.

Most of the women and children were soon released. The men and those suspected as female fighters were transferred to the Hennala Garrison, where the prison camp was established. As there was not enough space in Hennala, some of the captured Reds were moved to camps established in Helsinki, Hämeenlinna and Lappeenranta. In Hennala, the total number of prisoners rose up to nearly 13,000, including 2,200 women and almost 300 children under the age of 15. In the next five months, almost 1,200 prisoners died of executions, disease and malnutrition.

Hennala camp was active until 15 September 1918, when most of the prisoners were released on parole. The camp was turned into a forced labour camp for convicted Reds, which was finally closed on 1 October 1919.

== Executions ==
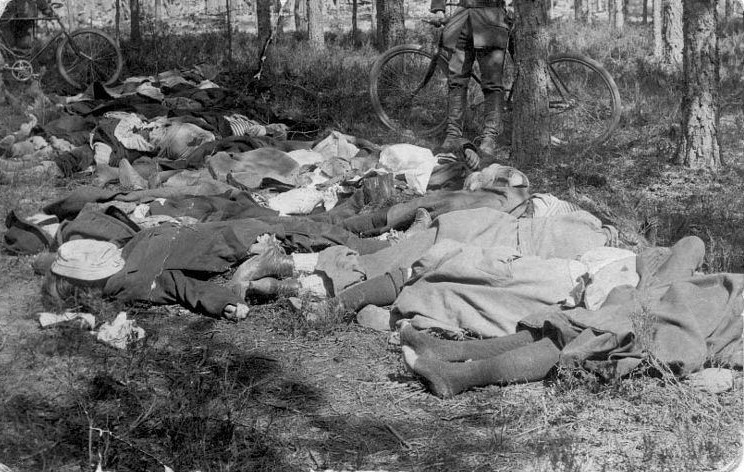
Executed women in Hennala

The number of Reds executed in Hennala was about 500, at least 218 of them were women, the youngest being only 14-year-old girls. A total of 13 underaged children were shot. The largest single execution in Lahti was made on 9 May, when at least 100 Red women were shot.

All those executed women did not belong to the armed guards, the victims included women who had only joined the fleeing refugees. Among them were pregnant women and mothers of small children. According to the diaries of the German officer Hans Tröbst, the women were shot with a machine gun in the nearby wood. They were most likely raped before the execution. The executions were carried out by the battalion of the notorious Estonian colonel Hans Kalm who was interested in eugenics. For him, the Red women represented the lowest category of society. One of the executed male fighters was the Red Guard commander-in-chief Ali Aaltonen who was shot by Kalm himself.

== Memorials ==
The killed Reds were buried into a mass grave in the Mustankallio Cemetery. The first memorial was erected secretly in the night before the First of May in 1929. The monument was soon vandalized and destroyed by the Whites. The present memorial was finally erected after the World War II in 1946, as the political situation in Finland had changed. Another monument was unveiled in Hennala in 1949. The third memorial is placed in the area of the Fellman camp, which today is a park in the western side of the Lahti city center. The monument is a work of the sculptor Erkki Kannosto and it was erected in 1978.

== Importance ==
In the post-war decades, the Hennala camp has become the best known and most remembered prison camp together with the Tammisaari camp. Hennala has been described in several pieces of literature, plays, films and music. Even the Finnish painter Henry Ericsson, who served in Hennala as a guard, has described the languished prisoners in his etchings.
