= Female Red Guards of the Finnish Civil War =

Women's Red Guards
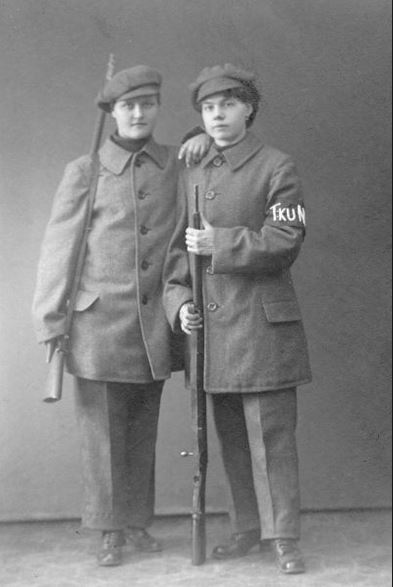
- Helena Aalto (b. 1898) and Elli Vuokko (b. 1890) of the Turku Women's Guard, both executed in May 1918
- Active: February–May 1918
- Allegiance: Red Finland
- Branch: Red Guards
- Role: Combat units
- Size: 2,000 members
- Engagements: Finnish Civil War

All-female units of the paramilitary Red Guards served in the 1918 Finnish Civil War. The first Women's Guards units formed in early February in the main Finnish cities. More than 15 female Guards units were established by the end of March 1918, with a total of about 2,000 women serving. The female Guards units consisted of young industrial workers, maids, and servants. Their average age was about 20, but some were as young as 14. The women served in auxiliary units in combat.

By joining the Red Guards, women stepped out of their traditional role in Finnish society and were demonized by the Whites, the anti-communist paramilitary. The Red commanders were reluctant to commit the female Guards units to battle and usually held them in reserve. Towards the end of the war, several saw combat. During the Battle of Tampere, the city hall was the last pocket of Red resistance; there is a legend that this was because while the male defenders wanted to capitulate, the Tampere Women's Red Guard insisted on fighting to the end.

The fiercely fought Finnish Civil War lasted 15 weeks. It was marked by massacres of prisoners and civilians in campaigns of terror. Over 10,000 Reds were murdered in the subsequent White terror. Captured women who were considered to be armed fighters would usually be shot and were sometimes raped before their execution.

== History ==
=== Background ===
Initial front lines and offensives of the Civil War at the beginning of February 1918. Areas controlled by the Finnish government ("Whites") in blue, and by the Finnish rebels ("Reds") in red

Finnish working-class women took a more active role in society beginning in the late 1800s, most notably in the suffrage movement which began during the 1890s. Women took part in the organisation of conscription strikes as part of the movement against the Russification of Finland from the early 1900s, and female labourers played a major role in the 1905 general strike. Although Finnish women gained the right to vote in 1906 (second in the world), women's social status lagged behind that of men; a married woman was under her husband's authority and could not have a job without his permission. The condition of working-class women was much worse than that of middle-class women, and the situation for maids and servants was especially poor. Under the 1865 Imperial Servant Act they lived in slave-like conditions, often experiencing sexual abuse. Child labour was legal in Finland until the 1920s.

The Finnish Civil War was a conflict from 27 January to 15 May 1918 for the leadership and control of Finland during the country's transition from a Grand Duchy of the Russian Empire to an independent state. The clashes took place in the context of the national, political, and social turmoil caused by World War I. The civil war was fought between the Reds, led by a section of the Social Democratic Party, and the Whites, controlled by the conservative-based Senate. The paramilitary Red Guards, were largely made up of industrial and agrarian workers and controlled the cities and industrial centres of southern Finland. The paramilitary White Guards consisted of farmers, along with middle-class and upper-class social strata, and controlled rural central and northern Finland.

=== Formation ===
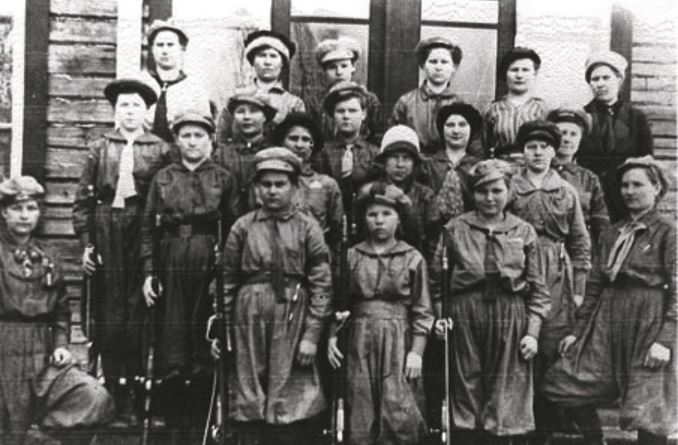
The Pyhtää Women's Guard, which fought the Germans in the Kyminlinna Fort

The first Women's Guards units, formed in early February in Helsinki, Vyborg, and Valkeakoski, were modelled on the Women's Battalions of the 1917 Russian Revolution. At first, the Red government, the Red Guard staff and the anti-militarist Social Democratic Women's Union opposed the formation of the women's units. On 13 March, the Red government recognized existing units but ended the formation of new units. Its order was not strictly observed, however, and some new units were still formed in late March and early April in the largest industrial portions of Red-controlled Finland; with few exceptions, they were not formed in rural areas. Some women served in combat units, and others were assigned to support duties. The armed women received brief military training from Red Guard leaders. At first, they did guard duty, but in late March they began to be sent to the front.

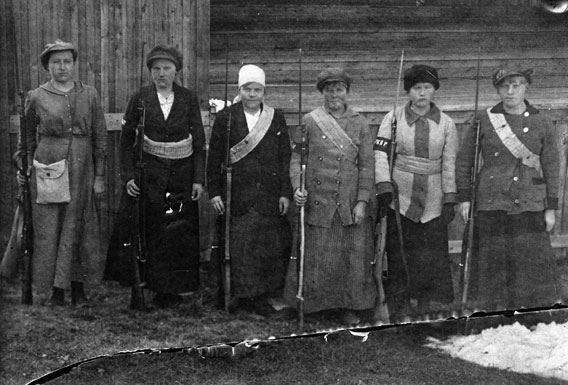
The Women's Guard from Vihti, one of the few formed in the countryside, was composed of local maids.

The core of the Women's Guards were radical women who wanted to create a more egalitarian society and improve the status of women. The women cut their hair short and wore unconventional clothing, often rejecting skirts and dresses in favour of trousers (worn only by men at the time). Their rejection of traditional values earned the enmity of the Finnish Whites because the working women did not fit the roles of conservative, middle-class society. Although many women testified in court after the war that they joined the Red Guards for the money (a higher-than-usual salary), their testimony was considered self-serving since they faced sentencing.

The total number of women who served in the Red Guards is unclear; incomplete Red Guards payroll records list 1,440 Women's Guard members. According to historian Ohto Manninen, the total was 2,000. According to an upcoming 2017 book by historian Tuomas Hoppu, there were at least 2,600 members— more than three percent of the 80,000 Red Guard fighters. Thousands of other women also supported the Red Guards. The Political Offence Court accused more than 5,500 women of being Reds after the war ended in May 1918, a fraction of the total. Although 4,000 of the accused were convicted of treason, all except some of the leadership were pardoned in October 1918.

=== Public attitudes ===
By joining the Red Guards, women stepped out of their traditional role in Finnish society. They were perceived as a threat by the conservative Finnish Whites, who considered them immoral, unfeminine women unfit for the roles of wife and mother. During the war, unsubstantiated rumours were spread about Red Guard women; according to White newspapers, the Reds tortured all their prisoners and castrated some. Only one woman is known to have participated in White executions, despite the fact that over 1,600 people were killed in the Red terror. Red nurses working in field hospitals were mocked as "sisters of love", implying that they were prostitutes.

Animosity toward Red women was so harsh that they were often dehumanized and demonized. A well-known outburst was made by Finnish author Ilmari Kianto, who called Red women "wolf bitches" who should be exterminated. According to a Hufvudstadsbladet article, Red women should not be treated as prisoners of war but should be "chased into the woods like animals". Another newspaper, Aamulehti, called them the "lowest scum" who must be cleansed from Finnish society. Archbishop Gustaf Johansson said that Red women must be left "in the hands of Satan" and not helped in any way. The bodies of women killed in battle were often desecrated by being stripped or partially undressed. After the war, Red women were rejected by society and their role in the war was belittled for decades. Nearly all academic research on the women dates only to the 1990s.

=== Combat ===
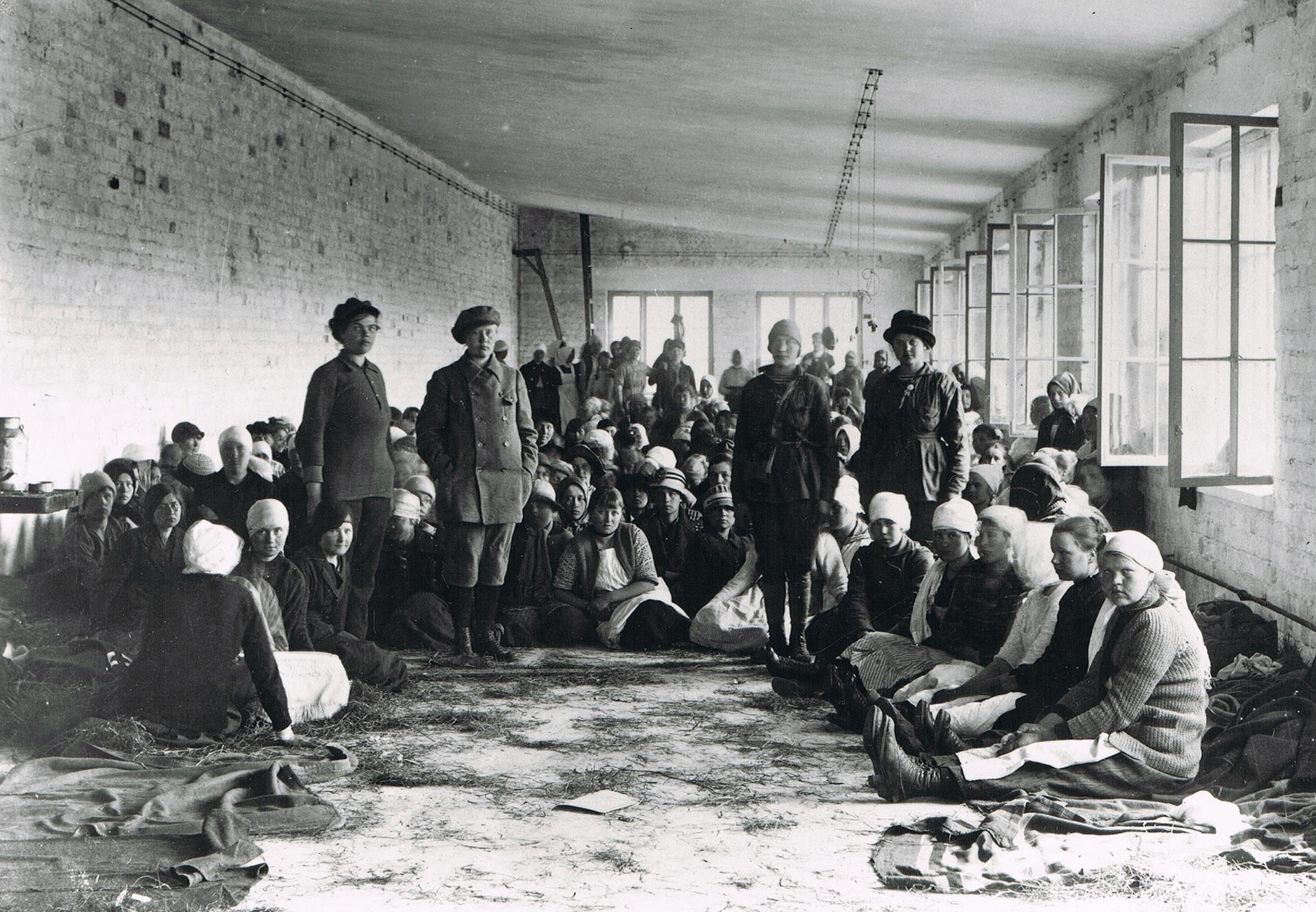
Captured Red women in Lahti. Most were executed soon after this photograph was taken.

Women's Guards were the last reserve in the war's final stages. In April, they took part in the defensive battles of Tampere, Helsinki and Vyborg and the Battle of Antrea in the Karelian Isthmus. Women who joined the Red refugees fleeing east also fought German troops in southern Tavastia as thousands of refugees tried to break through the German lines. In the Battle of Syrjäntaka in Tuulos on 28 April, over 4,000 refugees clashed against the German lines with the Valkeakoski Women's Guard in front. In only a few hours, more than 300 Red Guard fighters and dozens of German soldiers died in battle at a highway crossroads. The Germans retreated when they ran out of ammunition. The women had already cleared the way for the refugees the previous day in the village of Alvettula, crossing a bridge held by White troops. A few days after the Battle of Syrjäntaka, 20,000–30,000 Reds were captured near the town of Lahti.

=== Executions ===
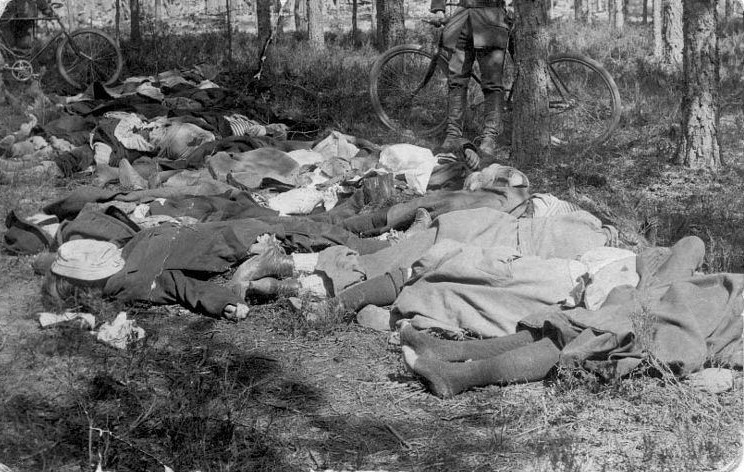
Executed members of the female Red Guards in Hennala prison camp, early May 1918

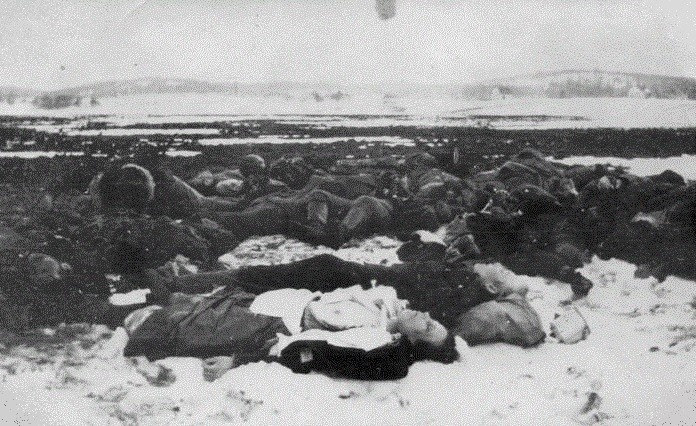
Executed Red Guards in the Hatanpää district of Tampere. A woman with her breasts exposed is in the front of the picture.

About 420 to 460 members of the Women's Guards were executed during the final stages of the war. The largest mass executions took place in Lahti, where 20,000–30,000 fleeing Reds were captured by German and White troops at the end of April. Up to 2,200 Red women were placed in the Hennala camp, where a battalion commanded by the Estonian colonel Hans Kalm shot at least 218 women in early May. The number may be considerably higher; the Labour Archives of Finland's Terror List includes the names of 600 women, but their fate cannot be verified. The largest single execution in Lahti was carried out on 9 May, when at least 100 Red women were shot. According to the diary of German officer Hans Tröbst, they were shot with a machine gun in the woods near the Hennala Garrison; according to Tröbst, the surrounding trees were spattered with brain tissue. Women wearing men's clothing, such as trousers or a military outfit, were commonly considered armed fighters and summarily shot. Women tried to get rid of their trousers, and sometimes wore nothing but underpants as they were picked from a crowd of captured Reds.

Not all those executed belonged to the Women's Guards. Victims included women who had joined the fleeing refugees, some of whom were pregnant or mothers of small children. The youngest girls shot were 14 years old. The women executed in Lahti came from the provinces of Häme, Turku and Pori and Uusimaa, primarily from Alastaro, Forssa, Hyvinkää, Hämeenlinna, Lahti, Loimaa, Maaria, Mäntsälä, Pori, and Turku. The Valkeakoski Women's Guard was executed in the village of Hauho on 1 May. Some of the women were raped before they were shot; other women imprisoned in Lahti received food in exchange for sexual favours.

The executions were carried out by Finnish Whites. The Germans did not execute Red women and, in many cases, tried to stop the Whites from shooting their prisoners. However, the Germans did participate in sexual abuse of the captured women. According to recent studies the executions were an organized effort to "cleanse" Finnish society of the Red Guard women. Most of the executed women were industrial workers, whom the Whites considered the lowest social class. The Guard members who had worked as maids or servants and came from rural areas were shot less often. In Lahti the executed men were usually commanders and platoon leaders, but in the case of women ordinary fighters were also shot. The Red women were seen as a threat to Finnish racial purity. Colonel Hans Kalm, leader of the Lahti executions, was interested in the eugenics of Martti Pihkala and Lauri Pihkala (brothers who were among the main inspirations of White Finland). In addition to executing Red women, the Whites carried out ethnic cleansing; more than 400 Russian civilians died in the Vyborg massacre.

The extrajudicial killings and the executions of those sentenced by temporary courts-martial were finally halted in late May. Prisoners were then brought to the newly-established Political Offense Court, which commuted the death sentences.

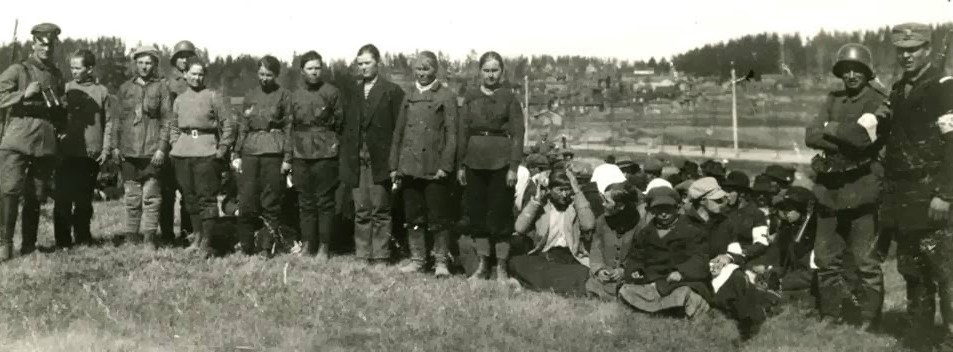
Captured Red women in Lahti, guarded by German and White soldiers. Women wearing trousers or a military outfit were separated from the crowd.

=== Casualties ===
At least 755 Red Guard women died in the war; 70 to 130 were killed on the battlefield, 420 to 460 were executed by the White Guards, 80 to 110 died in prison camps, and 180 were missing.

== Largest units ==
=== Helsinki ===
The Helsinki Women's Guard was the largest unit, with 466 members. They fought the German Baltic Sea Division in the Battle of Helsinki on 12–13 April, defending the Linnanmäki hill. However, research has indicated that their role has been exaggerated.

=== Tampere ===
Tampere had two Women's Guard units, one in the town and another in the suburb of Pispala. The Tampere Guard had 221 members, and the Pispala Guard (led by the 18-year-old peasant Emma Oksala) 40 to 50. During the final hours of the 5 April Battle of Tampere, the Tampere Guard defended the city hall; the male fighters were willing to surrender, but the women insisted on fighting to the last woman. As the battle was ending, only three women were shot. Women were not executed in Tampere, despite the mass execution of more than 3,000 Reds who had surrendered. The White Guard staff prohibited the execution of women, probably because of the large number of foreigners in the city.

=== Valkeakoski ===
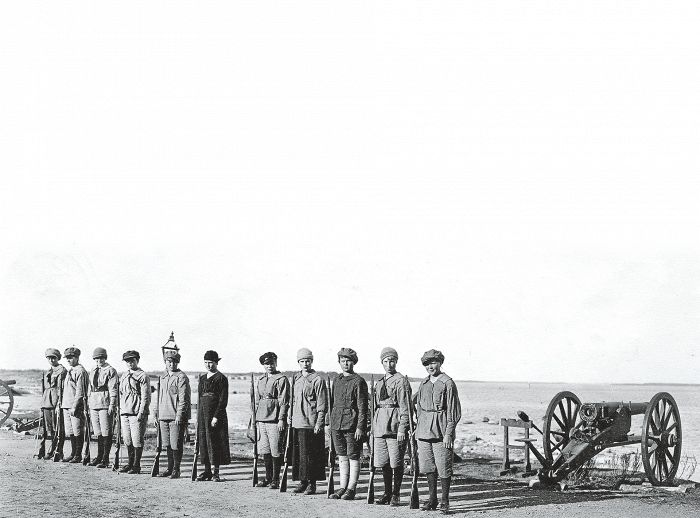
The Uuras Women's Guard in the Trångsund Fortress

The 155-member Valkeakoski Women's Guard was primarily composed of women who worked in the Tervasaari Paper Mill. When the Red refugee column fought the Germans on their way east at the end of April, the Valkeakoski guard took an important bridge in the village of Alvettula (north of Hämeenlinnan) on 25 April. Two days later, they fought German troops in the Battle of Syrjäntaka. Some of the women were captured after the battle and handed over to the White Guard. More than 20 women were held in a barn (and possibly raped) for two days before they were shot in the village of Hauho. A total of 47 Valkeakoski women were killed during the war.

=== Vyborg ===
The Vyborg Women's Guard fought in the Battle of Antrea and the Battle of Vyborg. The 151-member unit was led by 20-year-old Toini Mäkelä. After the war, she fled to Soviet Russia and formed a women's battalion which fought in the Russian Civil War. Another Vyborg women's guard was formed in the port of Uuras by local workers. The Uuras Guard occupied the Trångsund Fortress.

=== Turku ===
The Turku Women's Guard (also known as the Maaria Women's Guard) was composed of women from the Turku suburb of Raunistula (part of Maaria at the time). The 113-member guard first fought in the Battle of Tampere. After the town collapsed, the Turku women fought on the Satakunta front and in the Battle of Lempäälä. Dozens of its members were executed at the Hennala camp in Lahti after they were captured on their way east.
