= Battle of Lahti =

1918 battle of the Finnish Civil War

Coordinates: 60.983506°N 25.651888°E

- Part of the Finnish Civil War in the Eastern Front of World War I
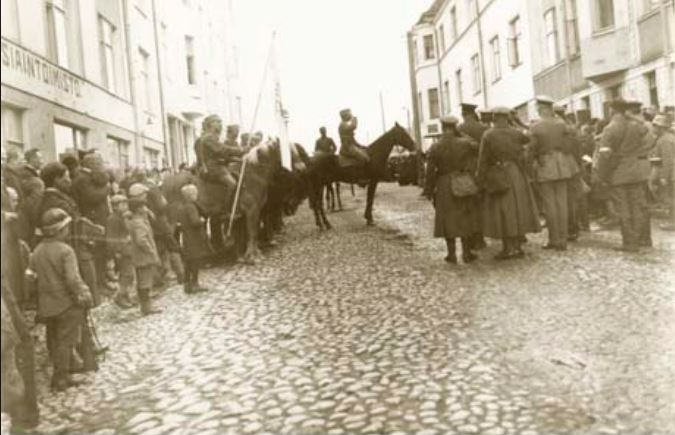
- Colonel von Brandenstein and Major Kalm greeting each other in the main street
Date	19 April – 1 May 1918 (1 week and 5 days)
Location	Lahti, Finland
Result	White victory

Belligerents
German Empire; Finnish Whites	Finnish Reds

Commanders and leaders
(German Empire) Otto von Brandenstein; Hans Kalm	Nestor Linnanen; Teodor Huurre

Strength
800 Germans; 3,000 Whites	800 members of the Lahti Red Guard; ~10,000 armed refugees

Casualties and losses
64 Germans killed ~20 Whites killed	at least 200 killed ~30,000 captured

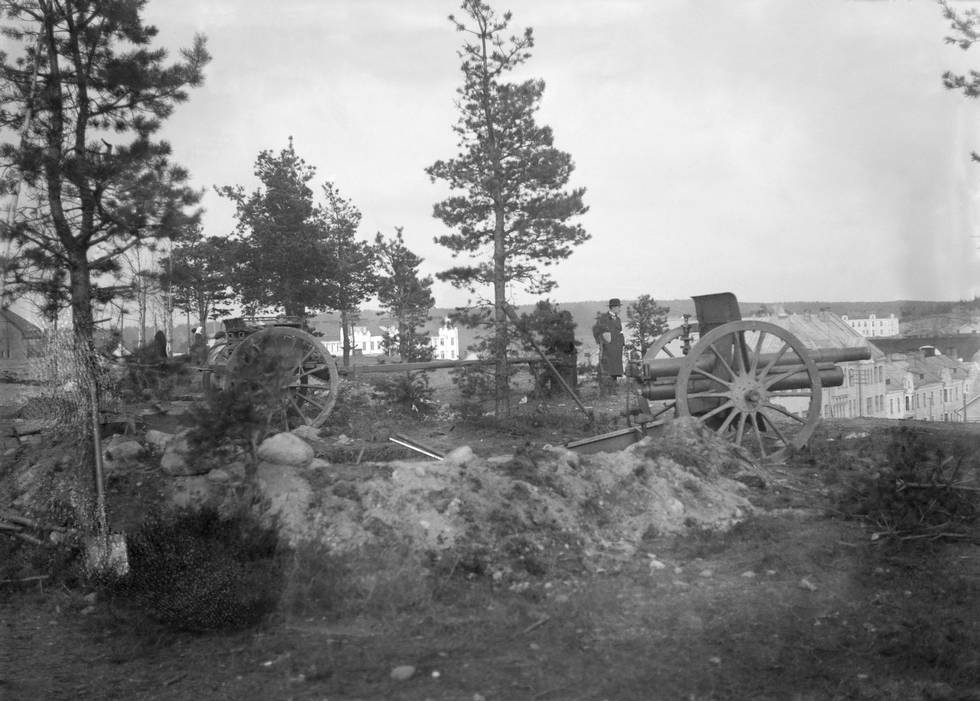
Red artillery in the Radiomäki Hill

Battle of Lahti was a 1918 Finnish Civil War battle, fought from 19 April to 1 May by the German troops and Finnish Whites against the Finnish Reds in Lahti, Finland. Together with the Battle of Viipuri, from 24 to 29 April, it was the last major battle of the war.

The German unit Detachment Brandenstein, commanded by colonel Otto von Brandenstein, attacked Lahti on 19 April, taking the town by the next evening. At the same time, a column of tens of thousands of Red refugees was approaching Lahti from the west. On 22 April, the Reds launched a counterattack to break through the German lines and clear the way for the fleeing people. The attempt failed and the Reds finally surrendered on 1 May. As a result, the Whites and Germans captured about 30,000 Reds and their family members who were placed in a concentration camp on the outskirts of Lahti.

== Background ==
At the time of the Finnish Civil War, Lahti had a population of 6,500. The town was important for the Reds due to its location by the vital Riihimäki–Saint Petersburg railway, connecting Lahti to the major war theatres in Tavastia and Karelia. Red troops were formed and trained in the Hennala Garrison which the Russians had built in the early 1910s. As the Red front had collapsed in the northern part of Tavastia and the Battle of Tampere was over in 6 April, tens of thousands of Red refugees headed east through Hämeenlinna and Lahti. In the late April, there were about 40,000 Reds inside the triangle formed by the towns of Hämeenlinna, Riihimäki and Lahti.

The German Baltic Sea Division landed in Hanko on 3 April. After the victorious Battle of Helsinki, fought 12–13 April, the division marched north to Riihimäki and Hämeenlinna, which forced the Red refugees to head to Lahti. Another German unit, Detachment Brandenstein, landed 75 kilometres east of Helsinki in Loviisa 12 April. The original plan for Detachment Brandenstein was to attack the Red stronghold of Kotka and then cut the Saint Petersburg railway in Kouvola. For some reason, the Germans finally decided to move north to Lahti, instead of Kotka in the east.

== German offensive ==
As the Germans reached Lahti along the Loviisa–Vesijärvi railway, the Reds started building trenches, artillery batteries and other defensive posts to the slopes of the Salpausselkä ridge. In 13 April, the Detachment Brandenstein took the Orimattila village 20 kilometres south of Lahti. The offensive against the town was launched six days later on 19 April at 5 am. The main force commanded by the lieutenant colonel von Luck took the village of Villähde, 9 kilometres east of Lahti, at 1:00 pm and cut the Saint Petersburg railway, while the second unit attacked Lahti and reached the Railway Station at 7:00 am without any resistance. After taking the Hennala Garrison, the Germans entered the town in the evening. Colonel Luck and his men headed for the General Hospital at 10:00 pm and most of Lahti was held by the Germans by 11:00 pm. All this happened with hardly any resistance by the surprised Reds. Instead of the town itself, the Reds were only defending their positions in the Salpausselkä ridge. It is unclear why the attack took the Reds by surprise, as they knew the Germans were approaching. One explanation is their poor reconnaissance and surveillance.

On the morning of 20 April, the Germans reached the harbour by the Vesijärvi lake. At the same time the Finnish White Army division, commanded by the Estonian major Hans Kalm, entered the town from north as the Reds on the Radiomäki hill had surrendered. The German commander colonel Otto von Brandenstein and Hans Kalm greeted each other in a modest ceremony held in the Lahti main street. On the next day, a small clash occurred as a group of 1,000 Red Guard fighters came by armoured train to Okeroinen, a village in Hollola, 5 kilometres south of Lahti. The Reds tried to break into the town but were pushed back. During the first two days of the battle, the Germans lost six men killed. Red losses were at least 37 killed and 500 captured. 300 more were captured within next three days as the Germans searched for Reds in their homes. The ones found with a fired rifle were shot.

== Red counterattack and capitulation ==
As the column of refugees reached the outskirts of Lahti, the Reds launched a counterattack on 22 April. They were desperately trying to break the German lines and march through the town to continue their journey eastward, but managed only to take the Hennala Garrison. In the next morning, the Red artillery started firing on the town. The bombing of German positions lasted for six days. At least 16 Reds were shot by the Germans as a retaliation for firing the military hospital. Some sources claim that even 60 Reds were executed, but this cannot be verified. The Whites, in turn, shot up to 30 Reds before the battle was over.

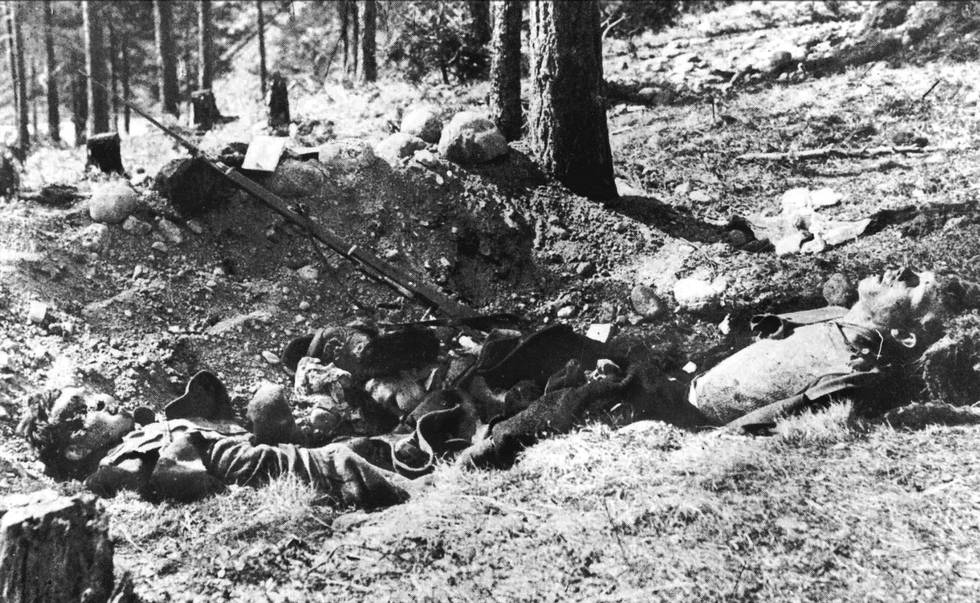
Fallen Reds in the Salpausselkä ridge

No heavy fighting occurred in 25–28 April, but on 28 April the Reds launched another attack against the German lines. The fighting lasted for two days but despite their overwhelming strength, the Reds could not beat the experienced and well-armed German troops. The Germans had only about 800 men in Lahti while the Reds had up to 10,000 armed men from Western Finland and Helsinki region who had come with the refugee column. The problem for the Reds was that there was no order of battle and nobody commanded the force. There were only a couple of organized units, like the Turku Women's Guard and the squad composed of the youth section of the sports club Jyry Helsinki.

The Germans in turn, managed in taking the Okeroinen village by the Helsinki railway on 30 April. They were now able to encircle the Red troops of the Hennala Garrison. In the morning of 1 May, the Germans attacked Hennala but the Reds had already fled. At 8:00 a.m., the Reds started surrendering and the Battle of Lahti was over, although there was still minor resistance in the surroundings of the town and five Germans were killed on 2 May.

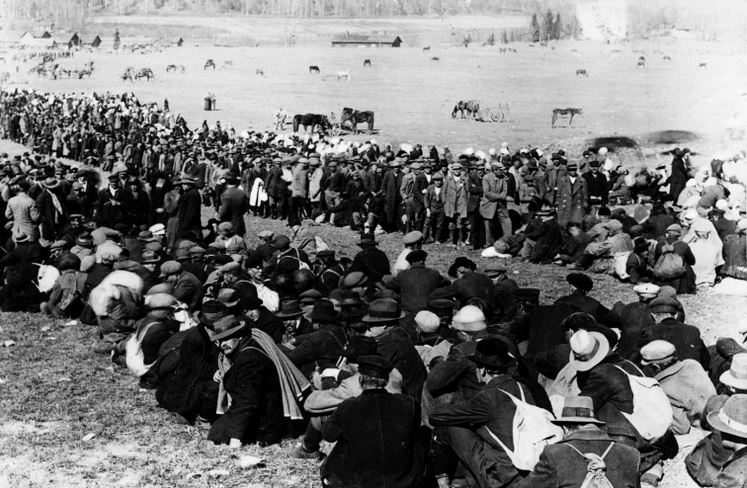
Captured Reds of the Fellman camp

== Aftermath ==
As the battle was over, the Germans and Finnish Whites captured about 30,000 Reds in the surroundings of Lahti. The numbers include Red Guards fighters and their family members as well as other Red supporters who had fled from the western and southern parts of the Red Finland. Among the captured was also the group of 4,000–5,000 Red refugees who had only a couple of days earlier fought their way through the German lines in the bloody Battle of Syrjäntaka. Up to 10,000 Reds surrendered in the fields of Vesala in Hollola, 10 kilometres west of Lahti. Led by the military band of the Pori Red Guard, the group marched to Lahti. The band was playing revolutionary anthems like The Internationale and La Marseillaise until the Germans finally took their instruments.

22,000 captured Reds were gathered to the Fellman camp, a short-lived concentration camp in the fields of the Fellman Manor. The rest of the Reds were placed in factories, schools and other public buildings in Lahti. A prison camp was also established to the Hennala Garrison.

The women and children were soon released from the Fellman camp and 13,000 Reds were moved to the Hennala camp. Most of them were men, but among the detainees were also more than 1,000 women and a smaller number of children. According to the past research, all women were released, but recent studies have shown that the Women's Red Guard fighters were systematically executed by the Whites and most likely sexually abused. At least 218 women were shot, the youngest being only 14-year-old girls. The total number of executed Reds was more than 500. The executions were carried out by the Finnish battalion led by the Estonian colonel Hans Kalm. The Germans shot only approximately 20–30 Reds during the Battle of Lahti but did not participate the later executions. In some cases they were even trying to stop the Whites from executing their prisoners. The Germans usually robbed the killed as well as the captured Reds of their personal possessions. This was verified in the war diaries of the German officer Hans Tröbst, released as the sixth part of the 2015 book Der Krieg im Westen.

The Hennala Camp was active until the end of September 1918. Nearly 1,200 of the 13,000 prisoners died of executions, disease or malnutrition.

Trenches and potholes are still visible in the Salpausselkä hills. They are preserved by the Finnish National Board of Antiquities because of the historical significance. Some of the trenches were accidentally destroyed in 2015 as new skiing trails were built for the 2017 Nordic World Ski Championships.

== See also ==
- Battle of Helsinki
- Battle of Hyvinkää
- Battle of Tampere
- Battle of Viipuri
