= Battle of Rautu =

1918 battle of the Finnish Civil War

Coordinates: 60.547069°N 30.216672°E

- Part of the Finnish Civil War in the Russian Civil War and Eastern Front of World War I
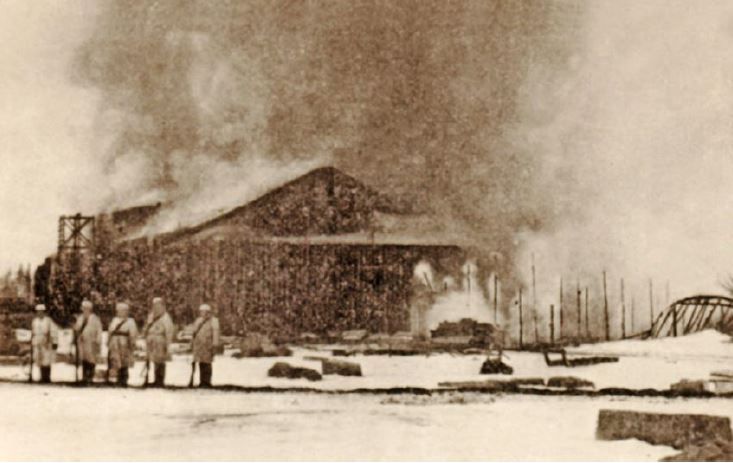
- Rautu railway station on fire
Date	21 February – 5 April 1918 (1 month, 2 weeks and 1 day)
Location	Rautu, Finland
Result	White victory

Belligerents
Finnish Whites	Finnish Reds (Russian Soviet Federative Socialist Republic) Soviet Russia

Commanders and leaders
Aarne Sihvo; Ernst Löfström; Lennart Oesch	M. V. Prigorovski †; Oskar Rantala; Arvid Leinonen; Heikki Kaljunen

Strength
2,000	2,700 Russians; 850 Finnish Reds

Casualties and losses
270 killed	860–1,200 killed in action or executed

The Battle of Rautu was a 1918 Finnish Civil War battle, fought in Rautu, Finland (now Sosnovo, Leningrad Oblast, Russia) from 21 February to 5 April 1918 between the Finnish Whites and the Finnish Reds supported by the Russian Bolsheviks.

The battle was fought by the Rautu railway station, taken by the Reds in late February and soon sieged by the Whites. After weeks of trench warfare, the Whites launched their decisive attack and finally smashed the Red defense on 5 April. The last two days of the Rautu battle were one of the most fierce of all the Finnish Civil War battles. The battle is known as the massacre in the "Death Valley", where more than 400 fleeing Reds were killed by machine gunfire.

Unlike any other Finnish Civil War battle, the number of Russian Bolshevik troops was remarkable. The Russian interest is explained by Rautu's location only 60 kilometers north of Saint Petersburg. The Bolsheviks were concerned that the Finnish Whites and their ally Germany would launch an attack against the city along the Rautu railway. The Whites, in turn, were protecting their front on the western side of the Karelian Isthmus.

== The units ==
=== Whites ===
As the Reds captured Rautu station, it was held by only less than one hundred paramilitary White Guard members, led by the engineer Kyösti Kehvola. In a few days, they were reinforced by a unit of 300 men and in early March, the Rautu station was sieged by 500 Whites. They were now commanded by the Jäger captain Evert Ekman and since 8 March, as the Karelian Army arrived, by the rittmeister Georg Elfvengren. Before the final battle, the Whites were reinforced with a Jäger battalion commanded by the major Lennart Oesch.

The final operation was completed with 2,000 Whites. Most of the reinforcements were conscripts. Some of them were very unreliable, as many proved to be Red supporters. These men were disarmed and moved to construction forces.

=== Reds ===
The Russian troops were under the command of the Bolshevik revolutionary M. V. Prigorovski, but the war plans were mostly made by the general K. M. Yeremeyev, head of the Saint Petersburg Military District. The Finnish Reds were led in succession by Johan A. Palmu of Vyborg, then—beginning on 27 February—by the Red Guard leader Heikki Kaljunen after Oskar Rantala’s March resignation, and finally, for their last three weeks, by Arvid Leinonen. Their units were composed of the railroad workers who had come to Rautu from other parts of Finland and the members of the Saint Petersburg Finnish Red Guard.

The total number of Russians was about 3,000 but only 1,500 were present in Rautu at the same time. Russian troops included Red Army soldiers and paramilitary volunteers. As the Treaty of Brest-Litovsk was signed between Soviet Russia and the German Empire, most of the Russian troops withdrew on 12 March. Only two weeks later, the Bolsheviks strengthened the units against the treaty. Finally, there was about 1,200 Russians and 700 Finnish Reds, as well as hundreds of their family members who supported combat forces.

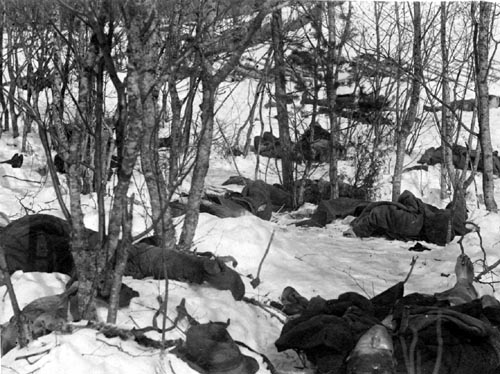
Fallen Reds in the "Death Valley"

== The battles ==
The Reds launched their campaign against the Rautu Station on 21 February as a part of their nationwide offensive. The final goal in Karelia was to reach the major railroad junction of Antrea (now Kamennogorsk, Vyborgsky District). The Rautu offensive was stopped after just two days and the force of 1,000 Reds decided to pull back to the railway station. Within a few days, they were surrounded by White forces on three sides, with only the road to Saint Petersburg still open. Both sides continued to launch minor attacks, but by early March, the fighting had settled into trench warfare. The Saint Petersburg – Hiitola railroad as well as the Rautu Station were still uncompleted, so the Reds had plenty of material, such as logs and bricks, to build a strong defensive line around the station.

The strengthened Whites started their offensive against Rautu on 25 March but were hit back as well as on 30–31 March. Two days later, the Whites cut the railroad towards Saint Petersburg and derailed an armored train with a cargo of ammunition, machine guns, and artillery pieces. The decisive attack was launched on 4 April, now with 2,000 men. The Reds were soon running out of ammunition and food supplies. In the morning of 5 April at 7:30 am, the Reds broke through the siege line on the southwest side of the station. The Red column headed south towards the Russian border but was soon caught in a crossfire of White machine guns in the nearby valley. Some of the Reds managed to escape but the machine-gun fire killed more than 400 Reds including a large number of women and children. The Bolshevik commander Prigorovski, as well as several wounded Reds, killed themselves in order to avoid falling into enemy hands. 800–900 Finnish Reds and Russian Bolsheviks were taken as prisoners, including more than a hundred children. The valley was soon nicknamed the ″Death Valley″ (Kuolemanlaakso) and in few years the name was even put on the map. After the victory in Rautu, the Whites were able to concentrate their troops against Vyborg, the Red capital of Eastern Finland.

== Casualties and aftermath ==
The Whites lost overall 270 men in Rautu, most of them were killed in the last two days of the battle. According to some sources, the White lost 400 men. The number of Red casualties is not known exactly. 860 were buried in a mass grave in the Death Valley, but according to the White commander Lennart Oesch, they buried up to 1,200 Reds. Their bodies were picked from the nearby woods for several days. Some sources also claim that even hundreds of captured Russians were executed.

Likewise, a few weeks later in Vyborg, the Whites conducted an ethnic cleansing in Rautu as they executed at least 13 Russian civilians of the Rautu Greek-Catholic parish. The executed held a Finnish citizenship and they were not affiliated with the Bolsheviks. 169 foreign citizens, most of them Russian and Polish military personnel, were captured and transported to a prison camp in Joensuu. 99 of them were executed on 14 April.
