= Sosnovo, Priozersky District, Leningrad Oblast =

Municipality in Russia

Coordinates: 60°33′N 30°13′E

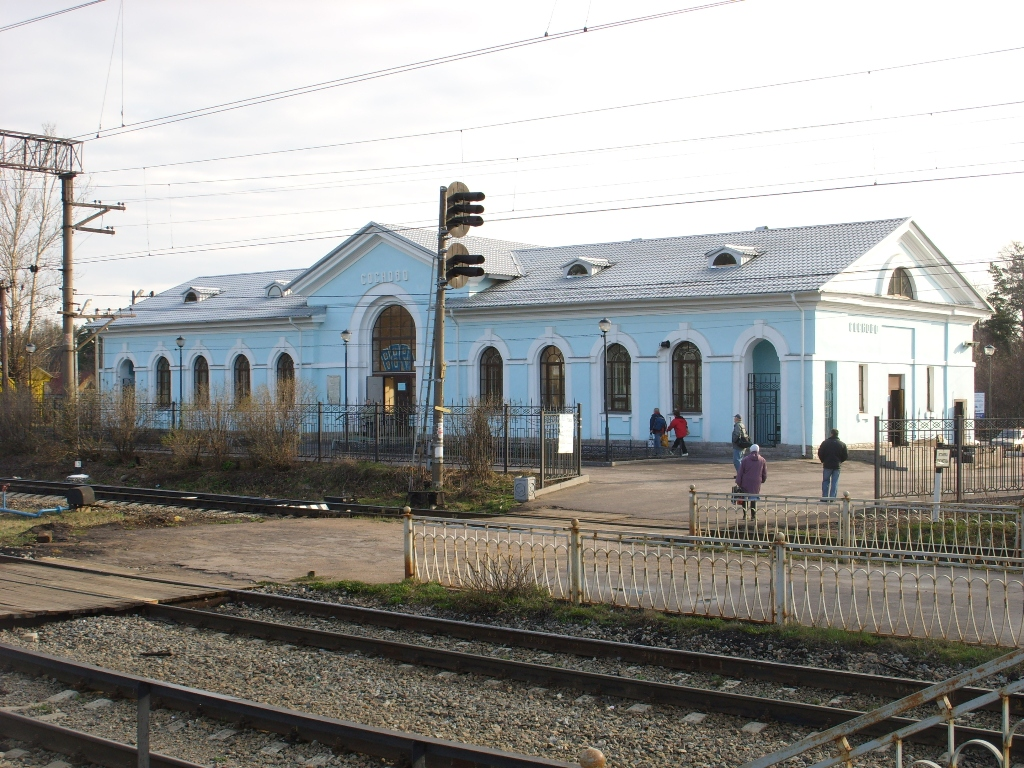
Sosnovo railway station building (2010).

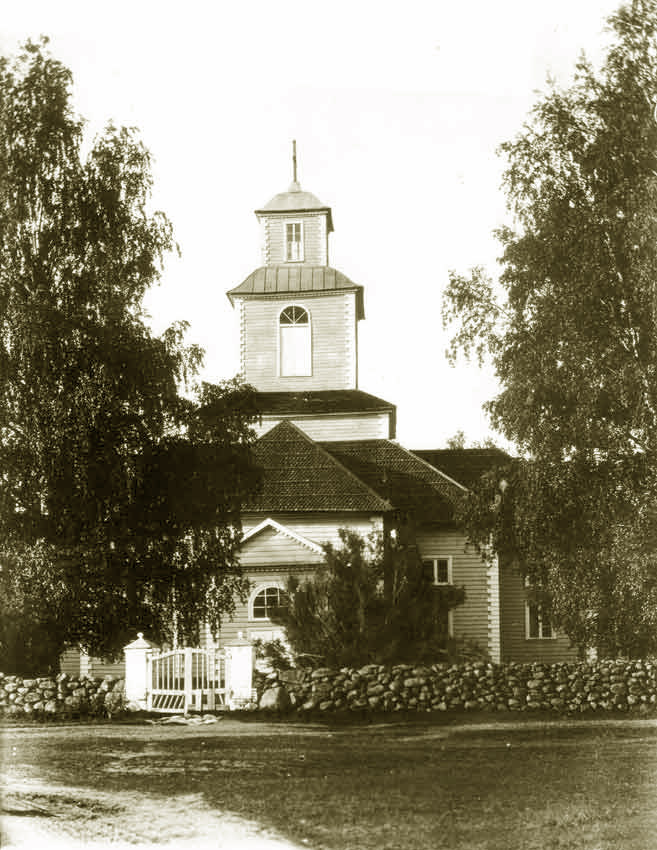
The old Lutheran church of Rautu destroyed in the Finnish Civil War in 1918. Photo taken in 1913.

Sosnovo (Russian: Сосново; Finnish: Rautu) is a rural locality (a logging depot settlement) in Priozersky District of Leningrad Oblast, Russia, located on the Karelian Isthmus, and an important railway station of the Saint Petersburg-Kuznechnoye railroad. Population: 7,209 (2010 Census); 5,953 (2002 Census).

== History ==
It was established in 1500 by name of Rautu in Finland. The Battle of Rautu was one of the major battles of the 1918 Finnish Civil War. Population of Rautu was Finnish and mostly Lutheran until the Winter War 1939-1940. The Finnish population was evacuated, and the settlement finally ceded to the Soviet Union after Continuation War in 1944. The historical name Rautu was changed to the Russian Sosnovo in 1948, as with most historical names of the ceded Finnish Karelian isthmus.

Before the Winter War (1939–1940) and the Continuation War (1941–1944), it was the administrative center of the Rautu municipality of Viipuri Province of Finland. Finnish Rautu had population 5909 in 1939.

Prize-winning Russian folklore ensemble Leznaya Skazka is located in Sosnovo.
