= Syrjäntaka =

Village in Tuulos, Hämeenlinna, Finland

Coordinates: 61.116189°N 24.831604°E

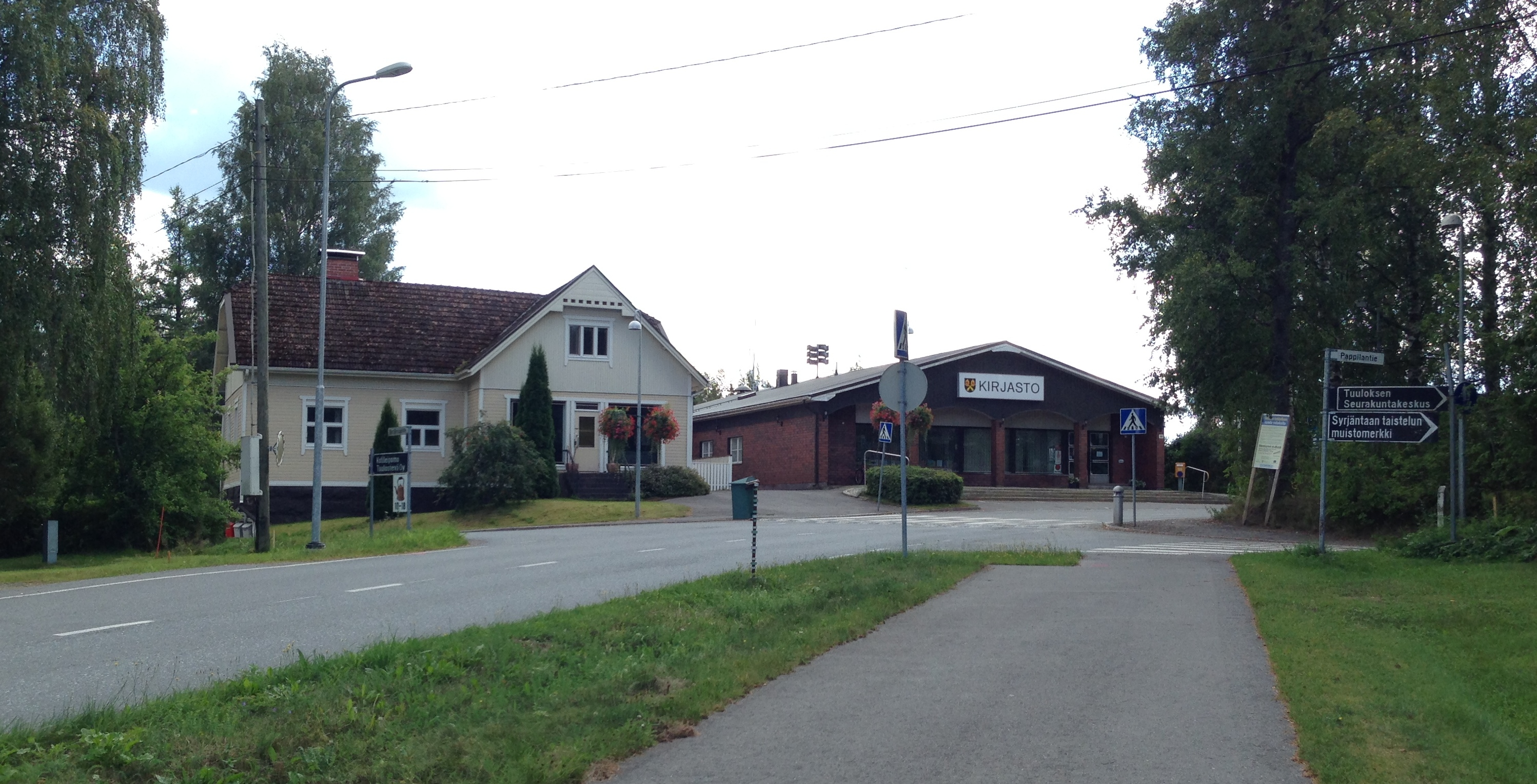
Syrjäntaka library

Syrjäntaka is a village in Hämeenlinna, Finland. It was the administrative center of the former municipality of Tuulos, consolidated with Hämeenlinna in 2009. The population of Syrjäntaka is about 600 (2012).

History of Syrjäntaka dates back to the Middle Ages, but the old village was destroyed in the April 1918 Battle of Syrjäntaka during the Finnish Civil War .
