= Mama Parsi Girls Secondary School =

School in Karachi

The Mama Parsi Girls' Secondary School

Location
- Karachi, Sindh, Pakistan
- Coordinates: 24°51′47″N 67°01′15″E

Information
- Type: Secondary School
- Motto: Let humility, charity, faith and labour light our path.
- Established: 1 April 1918
- Founder: Jamshed Nusserwanjee Mehta
- Principal: Furengeez D. Tampal
- Houses: Mama, Pochaji, Contractor, Dinshaw

The Mama Parsi Girls' Secondary School is in Karachi, Sindh, Pakistan. It was established on 1 April 1918.

== History ==
Mama Parsi Girls' Secondary School was founded on 1 April 1918 by Jamshed Nusserwanjee Mehta who collected three donations to establish the school. At first the new Parsi girls' school functioned in a portion of the Bai Virbaijee School, and was only opened for the Parsi community but later on Muhammad Ali Jinnah's request the school allowed Muslim students as well. It then shifted in June 1919 to a large building which stands today at the corner of Haji Abdullah Haroon and Inverarity Roads. This building was known as Mama Mansion.

Construction of the present building called The Mama Parsi Girls' High School was started on 17 January 1920 and completed on 26 January 1925. Pupils had their first academic lessons in the new building on 1 of April 1925.

Mama Parsi Girls Secondary School celebrated its 98th anniversary in 2016. The Mama Parsi Girls' Secondary School will celebrate its 106th-anniversary bash next year i.e. 1 April 2024

== Academic ==
The school works in two shifts: morning and afternoon. The afternoon shift consists of Classes I to VII, with Classes I and II and III IV having 3 sections each, D, E, & F and the rest have 3 sections each, D & E for the primary and E, F & G for the secondary.

After Class VIII, the girls are automatically transferred to the morning. The school has matriculation as well as Cambridge system. The students are required to give a test in grade five to be selected for the Cambridge system. The system starts from grade six.

== House system ==
The house system was introduced in 1943. The purpose of this set up was to cultivate the sense of contribution, leadership skills, team building and community living among pupils both through academic and co-curricular activities.

Each house has a motto:

- Mama: Before Honour Is Humility.
- Pochaji: Live Simply, Give Amply, Love Wisely.
- Contractor: Labor Omnia Vincit (Work Conquers All)
- Dinshaw: Per Fidam (Faith)

== School motto ==
Let humility, charity, faith and labour light our path.

== Principals ==
1. J. Kelly, first official principal — December 1918
2. Mary G. Boardman — 1919–1932
3. Cowashah Anklesaria — 1918-1941 (off and on as need arose)
4. Iris Henrietta Thompson — 1941–1969
5. Goola Bapuji Shroff — 1969–1974
6. Mani Shehriar Contractor — 1974–1991
7. Zarine Tehmurasp Mavalvala — 1991–2010
8. Furengeez D. Tampal — 2010 to date
