= Detachment Brandenstein =

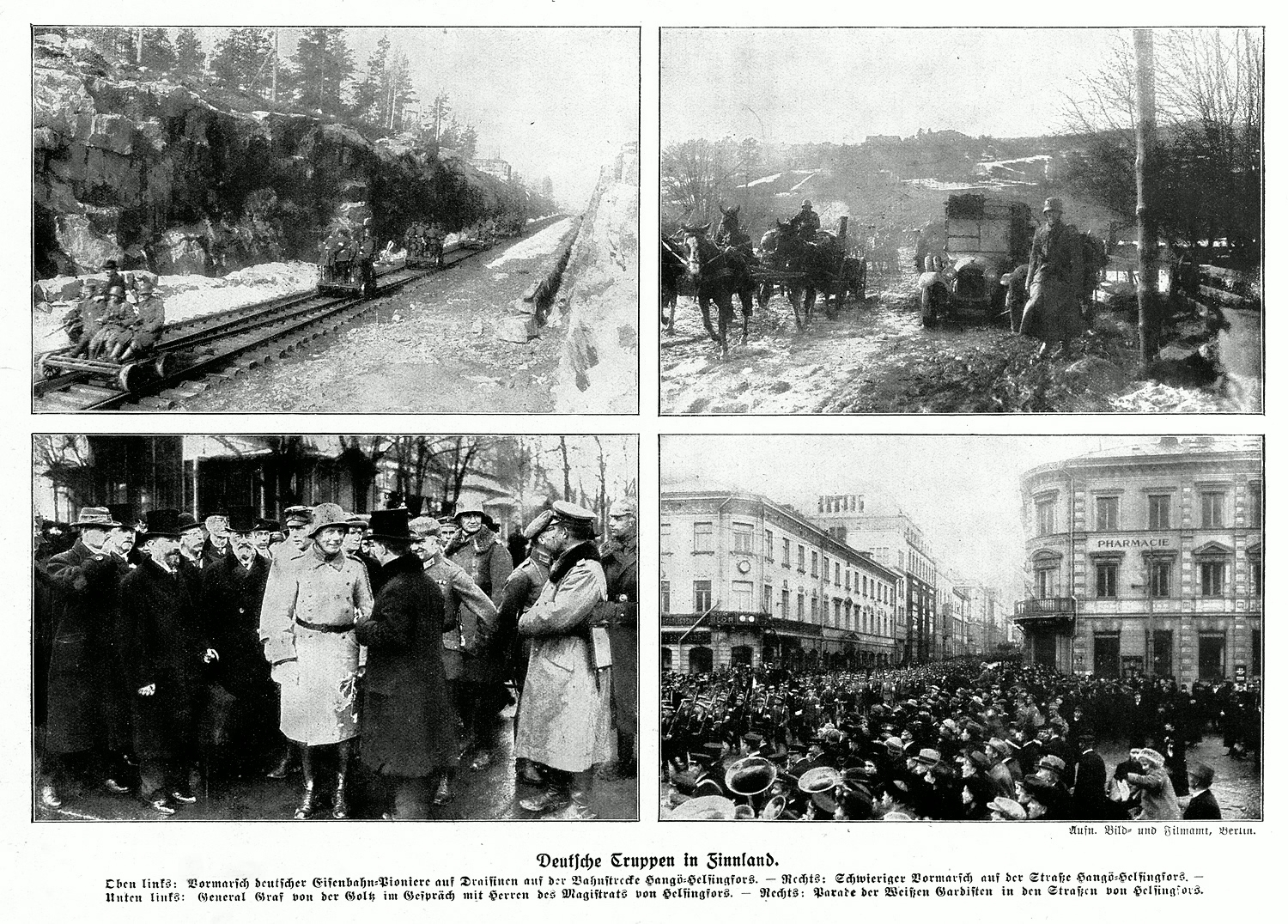
Detachment Brandenstein

Detachment Brandenstein (Finnish: Osasto Brandenstein) was a unit of the Imperial German Army commanded by Otto von Brandenstein that fought for the White Finns during the Finnish Civil War. The 3,000 man unit was assembled in Tallinn and landed at Loviisa on 7 April 1918. Its assigned mission was to control Eastern Uusimaa to cut the Red Finns' railway connections between Helsinki and Viipuri. The major operation for Detachment Brandenstein was the Battle of Lahti from 19 April to 1 May.

The Detachment Brandenstein was attached to the Baltic Sea Division.
