= Tuulos =

Former municipality of Finland

Coordinates: 61°07′00″N 24°49′55″E

Tuulos
Coat of Arms / Location
Founded	1874
Country	Finland
Province	Southern Finland
Region	Kanta-Häme
Official languages	Finnish
Town Manager	Aija Tuimala
Home page	http://www.tuulos.fi/

Tuulos (Swedish: Tuulos, also Tulois) is a former municipality of Finland. It was consolidated with Hämeenlinna on January 1, 2009. The administrative center of Tuulos was Syrjäntaka.

Neighbouring municipalities were Hauho, Hämeenlinna, Janakkala and Lammi.

It was located in the former province of Southern Finland and is part of the Kanta-Häme region. The municipality had a population of 1,536 (2003) and covered an area of 171.24 km² of which 13.14 km² is water. The population density is 9.7 inhabitants per km². The municipality is unilingually Finnish.

== Gallery ==
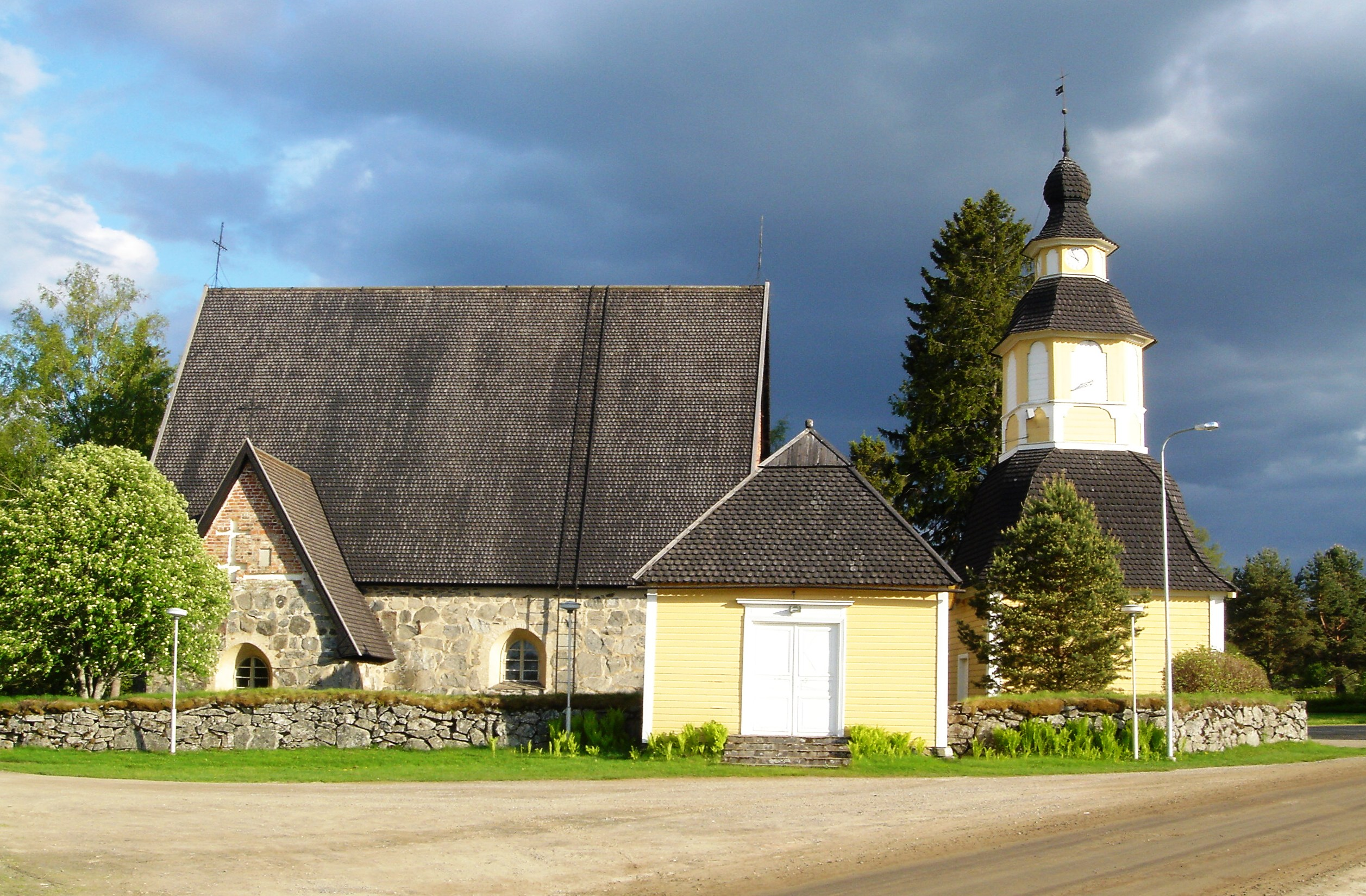
The medieval church of Tuulos in the district of Sairiala.
