= List of rural localities in Leningrad Oblast =

Map of Russia with Leningrad Oblast highlighted

This is a list of rural localities in Leningrad Oblast. Leningrad Oblast (Russian: Ленингра́дская о́бласть, romanized: Leningradskaya oblast’, IPA: [lʲɪnʲɪnˈgratskəjə ˈobləsʲtʲ]) is a federal subject of Russia (an oblast). It was established on August 1, 1927, although it was not until 1946 that the oblast's borders were settled in their present position. The oblast was named after the city of Leningrad (now St. Petersburg). The oblast has an area of 84,500 square kilometers (32,600 sq mi) and a population of 1,716,868 (2010 Census); up from 1,669,205 recorded in the 2002 Census. The most populous town of the oblast is Gatchina, with 88,659 inhabitants (as of the 2002 Census).

== Gatchinsky District ==
Localities in Gatchinsky District include:

- Bolshekolpanskoe Rural Settlement
- Lampovo
- Voiskovitsy

== Kingiseppsky District ==
Localities in Kingiseppsky District include:

- Bolshoye Kuzyomkino
- Itsipino
- Keykino
- Popovka
- Sarkyulya
- Ust-Luga
- Venekyulya
- Vistino

== Kirishsky District ==
Localities in Kirishsky District include:

- Avdetovo

== Kirovsky District ==
Localities in Kirovsky District include:

- Lezye

== Lomonosovsky District ==
Localities in Lomonosovsky District include:

- Gostilitsy
- Koporye
- Peniki
- Ropsha

== Luzhsky District ==
Localities in Luzhsky District include:

- Domkino
- Zalustezhye

== Podporozhsky District ==
Localities in Podporozhsky District include:

- Gimreka
- Vinnitsy

== Priozersky District ==
Localities in Priozersky District include:

- Gromovo
- Ivanovo
- Koloskovo
- Krivko
- Losevo
- Melnikovo
- Michurinskoye
- Novozhilovo
- Orekhovo (settlement)
- Orekhovo (village)
- Otradnoye
- Petrovskoye
- Platforma 69-y km
- Sapyornoye
- Sevastyanovo
- Snegiryovka
- Solovyovo
- Sosnovo
- Yarkoye
- Zamostye
- Zaporozhskoye

== Tikhvinsky District ==
Localities in Tikhvinsky District include:

- Abramovo
- Shugozero
- Valdost

== Tosnensky District ==
Localities in Tosnensky District include:

- Avati
- Telmana

== Volkhovsky District ==
Localities in Volkhovsky District include:

- Staraya Ladoga

== Volosovsky District ==
Localities in Volosovsky District include:

- Kikerino

== Vsevolozhsky District ==
Localities in Vsevolozhsky District include:

- Agalatovo
- Kokkorevo
- Lembolovo
- Novoye Devyatkino
- Romanovka
- Vaganovo
- Vaskelovo

== Vyborgsky District ==
Localities in Vyborgsky District include:

- Baryshevo
- Brusnichnoye
- Gavrilovo
- Kamenka
- Kirillovskoye
- Korobitsyno
- Lebyazhye
- Leypyasuo
- Lipovka
- Maynilo
- Mukhino
- Ozyorskoye
- Paltsevo
- Pervomayskoye
- Pionerskoye
- Pobeda
- Polyany
- Pravdino
- Pribylovo
- Seleznyovo
- Staroselye
- Sveklovichnoye
- Sverdlovo
- Svobodnoye
- Usadishche
- Veshchevo
- Vozrozhdeniye
- Yashino
- Zaytsevo
- Zhitkovo

== Former localities ==
- Kirjasalo
- Krakolye
- Magerburg
- Tyavzino

== See also ==
- Lists of rural localities in Russia
