= Ivanovo, Russia =

Ivanovo (Russian: Иваново) is the name of several inhabited localities in Russia.

== Arkhangelsk Oblast ==
As of 2010, one rural locality in Arkhangelsk Oblast bears this name:

- Ivanovo, Arkhangelsk Oblast, a village in Krasnovsky Selsoviet of Plesetsky District

== Chuvash Republic ==
As of 2010, two rural localities in the Chuvash Republic bear this name:

- Ivanovo, Tsivilsky District, Chuvash Republic, a selo in Opytnoye Rural Settlement of Tsivilsky District
- Ivanovo, Yantikovsky District, Chuvash Republic, a village in Yantikovskoye Rural Settlement of Yantikovsky District

== Ivanovo Oblast ==
As of 2010, three inhabited localities in Ivanovo Oblast bear this name.

Urban localities

- Ivanovo, a city

Rural localities

- Ivanovo, Pestyakovsky District, Ivanovo Oblast, a village in Pestyakovsky District
- Ivanovo, Rodnikovsky District, Ivanovo Oblast, a village in Rodnikovsky District

== Kirov Oblast ==
As of 2010, one rural locality in Kirov Oblast bears this name:

- Ivanovo, Kirov Oblast, a village under the administrative jurisdiction of the Town of Yaransk in Yaransky District

== Kostroma Oblast ==
As of 2010, two rural localities in Kostroma Oblast bear this name:

- Ivanovo, Kologrivsky District, Kostroma Oblast, a village in Sukhoverkhovskoye Settlement of Kologrivsky District
- Ivanovo, Makaryevsky District, Kostroma Oblast, a village in Nezhitinskoye Settlement of Makaryevsky District

== Leningrad Oblast ==
As of 2010, two rural localities in Leningrad Oblast bear this name:

- Ivanovo, Kirovsky District, Leningrad Oblast, a village under the administrative jurisdiction of Mginskoye Settlement Municipal Formation of Kirovsky District
- Ivanovo, Priozersky District, Leningrad Oblast, a village in Sosnovskoye Settlement Municipal Formation of Priozersky District

== Moscow Oblast ==
As of 2010, two rural localities in Moscow Oblast bear this name:

- Ivanovo, Ruzsky District, Moscow Oblast, a village in Ivanovskoye Rural Settlement of Ruzsky District
- Ivanovo, Yegoryevsky District, Moscow Oblast, a village in Savvinskoye Rural Settlement of Yegoryevsky District

== Nizhny Novgorod Oblast ==
As of 2010, two rural localities in Nizhny Novgorod Oblast bear this name:

- Ivanovo, Gorodetsky District, Nizhny Novgorod Oblast, a village in Timiryazevsky Selsoviet of Gorodetsky District
- Ivanovo, Vetluzhsky District, Nizhny Novgorod Oblast, a village in Moshkinsky Selsoviet of Vetluzhsky District

== Novgorod Oblast ==
As of 2010, one rural locality in Novgorod Oblast bears this name:

- Ivanovo, Novgorod Oblast, a village under the administrative jurisdiction of Lyubytinskoye Settlement of Lyubytinsky District

== Pskov Oblast ==
As of 2010, seven rural localities in Pskov Oblast bear this name:

- Ivanovo, Bezhanitsky District, Pskov Oblast, a village in Bezhanitsky District
- Ivanovo, Nevelsky District, Pskov Oblast, a village in Nevelsky District
- Ivanovo (Shikovskaya Rural Settlement), Ostrovsky District, Pskov Oblast, a village in Ostrovsky District; municipally, a part of Shikovskaya Rural Settlement of that district
- Ivanovo (Gorayskaya Rural Settlement), Ostrovsky District, Pskov Oblast, a village in Ostrovsky District; municipally, a part of Gorayskaya Rural Settlement of that district
- Ivanovo, Palkinsky District, Pskov Oblast, a village in Palkinsky District
- Ivanovo, Pushkinogorsky District, Pskov Oblast, a village in Pushkinogorsky District
- Ivanovo, Velikoluksky District, Pskov Oblast, a village in Velikoluksky District

== Ryazan Oblast ==
As of 2010, one rural locality in Ryazan Oblast bears this name:

- Ivanovo, Ryazan Oblast, a village in Ushmorsky Rural Okrug of Klepikovsky District

== Smolensk Oblast ==
As of 2010, three rural localities in Smolensk Oblast bear this name:

- Ivanovo, Demidovsky District, Smolensk Oblast, a village in Zakrutskoye Rural Settlement of Demidovsky District
- Ivanovo, Safonovsky District, Smolensk Oblast, a village in Ignatkovskoye Rural Settlement of Safonovsky District
- Ivanovo, Vyazemsky District, Smolensk Oblast, a village in Otnosovskoye Rural Settlement of Vyazemsky District

== Tula Oblast ==
As of 2010, one rural locality in Tula Oblast bears this name:

- Ivanovo, Tula Oblast, a village in Ivanovsky Rural Okrug of Belyovsky District

== Tver Oblast ==
As of 2010, three rural localities in Tver Oblast bear this name:

- Ivanovo, Kimrsky District, Tver Oblast, a khutor in Malovasilevskoye Rural Settlement of Kimrsky District
- Ivanovo, Likhoslavlsky District, Tver Oblast, a village in Pervitinskoye Rural Settlement of Likhoslavlsky District
- Ivanovo, Vesyegonsky District, Tver Oblast, a village in Ivanovskoye Rural Settlement of Vesyegonsky District

== Tyumen Oblast ==
As of 2010, one rural locality in Tyumen Oblast bears this name:

- Ivanovo, Tyumen Oblast, a selo in Ivanovsky Rural Okrug of Armizonsky District

== Udmurt Republic ==
As of 2010, one rural locality in the Udmurt Republic bears this name:

- Ivanovo, Udmurt Republic, a village in Gulekovsky Selsoviet of Glazovsky District

== Vladimir Oblast ==
As of 2010, two rural localities in Vladimir Oblast bear this name:

- Ivanovo, Kovrovsky District, Vladimir Oblast, a selo in Kovrovsky District
- Ivanovo, Petushinsky District, Vladimir Oblast, a village in Petushinsky District

== Vologda Oblast ==
As of 2010, five rural localities in Vologda Oblast bear this name:

- Ivanovo, Belozersky District, Vologda Oblast, a village in Gorodishchensky Selsoviet of Belozersky District
- Ivanovo, Cherepovetsky District, Vologda Oblast, a village in Dmitriyevsky Selsoviet of Cherepovetsky District
- Ivanovo, Kaduysky District, Vologda Oblast, a village in Nikolsky Selsoviet of Kaduysky District
- Ivanovo, Kirillovsky District, Vologda Oblast, a village in Pechengsky Selsoviet of Kirillovsky District
- Ivanovo, Sokolsky District, Vologda Oblast, a village in Chuchkovsky Selsoviet of Sokolsky District

== Yaroslavl Oblast ==
As of 2010, three rural localities in Yaroslavl Oblast bear this name:

- Ivanovo, Myshkinsky District, Yaroslavl Oblast, a village in Shipilovsky Rural Okrug of Myshkinsky District
- Ivanovo, Rostovsky District, Yaroslavl Oblast, a village in Fatyanovsky Rural Okrug of Rostovsky District
- Ivanovo, Uglichsky District, Yaroslavl Oblast, a village in Zaozersky Rural Okrug of Uglichsky District
