= List of localities in Russia named Orekhovo =

Orekhovo (Russian: Оре́хово) is the name of several rural localities in Russia:

== Modern localities ==
=== Altai Krai ===
As of 2012, one rural locality in Altai Krai bear this name:

- Orekhovo, Altai Krai, a selo in Burlinsky District

=== Belgorod Oblast ===
As of 2012, one rural locality in Belgorod Oblast bear this name:

- Orekhovo, Belgorod Oblast, a selo in Valuysky District

=== Leningrad Oblast ===
As of 2012, two rural localities in Leningrad Oblast bear this name:

- Orekhovo (settlement), Leningrad Oblast, a settlement in Sosnovskoye Rural Settlement of Priozersky District
- Orekhovo (village), Leningrad Oblast, a village in Sosnovskoye Rural Settlement of Priozersky District
- Orekhovo, name of several other rural localities
