= Koloskovo =

Koloskovo (Russian: Колосково) is the name of three different rural localities in Russia

- Koloskovo, Belgorod Oblast, a village and the administrative center of Koloskovskoye of Valuysky District, Belgorod Oblast
- Koloskovo, Leningrad Oblast, a settlement in Sosnovskoye Rural Settlement of Priozersky District, Leningrad Oblast
- Koloskovo, Nizhny Novgorod Oblast, a village in Semyonovsky Urban Okrug, Nizhny Novgorod Oblast
