= Krasnogvardeysky (rural locality) =

Krasnogvardeysky (Russian: Красногвардейский; masculine), Krasnogvardeyskaya (Красногвардейская; feminine), or Krasnogvardeyskoye (Красногвардейское; neuter) is the name of several rural localities in Russia:

- Krasnogvardeysky, Altai Krai, a settlement in Cherepanovsky Selsoviet of Zmeinogorsky District of Altai Krai
- Krasnogvardeysky, Ryazan Oblast, a settlement in Mosolovsky Rural Okrug of Shilovsky District of Ryazan Oblast
- Krasnogvardeysky, Artyomovsky District, Sverdlovsk Oblast, a settlement in Artyomovsky District of Sverdlovsk Oblast
- Krasnogvardeysky, Beryozovsky, Sverdlovsk Oblast, a settlement under the administrative jurisdiction of the town of Beryozovsky, Sverdlovsk Oblast
- Krasnogvardeysky, Tula Oblast, a settlement in Bolshekalmyksky Rural Okrug of Kireyevsky District of Tula Oblast
- Krasnogvardeysky, Vladimir Oblast, a settlement in Suzdalsky District of Vladimir Oblast
- Krasnogvardeyskoye, Republic of Adygea, a selo in Krasnogvardeysky District of the Republic of Adygea
- Krasnogvardeyskoye, Stavropol Krai, a selo in Krasnogvardeysky District of Stavropol Krai

== Historic names ==
- Krasnogvardeyskoye, the name of the town of Biryuch, Belgorod Oblast in 1958–2007
