= Petrovsky Borki =

Borki
- Location within Russia
- Location: Belgorod Oblast
- Nearest city: Valuyki
- Coordinates: 50°8′2″N 37°53′6″E
- Area: 220 hectares (544 acres; 1 sq mi)

Borki is a botanical reserve of regional importance in Valuisky District of Belgorod oblast. It is also known by the name of Petrovsky Borki.

== Geographical location ==
Borki is located in the territory of Valuysky District of Belgorod region, 1 km south of the village Borki (Borchanskoe rural settlement). Borki village lies on the left low-lying bank of river Kozynka and Borki towers over it, lying on a steep slope on the right bank opposite. The total area of the reserve is 220 hectares. In the north, it is bordered by the Reserve Borki village, on the south it is surrounded by a perimeter of crop fields.

== Vegetation ==
Study of vegetation in Borki was initiated by botanist V. M. Chernyaev in 1821. At that time Borki contained upland oak forest, within which was the pine grove of pine chalk (Pinus sylvestris var. cretacea). Traces of the oaks are still visible in the bushes on a steep slope descending to Kozynka. A pine grove was completely destroyed at the beginning of the twentieth century. Now on the slopes of the tract Borki there is forb-grass steppe vegetation which alternates with outcrops of Cretaceous rocks (marl). At the end of the last century in the upper part of Tracts slopes, people created small artificial plantations of black pine.

In Borki there are three types of plants listed in the Red Book of Russia: Daphne sophia, Cotoneaster alaunicus, stipa pennata. Shrub Daphne sofia is the kind endemic to the Don basin. It occurs on the steep northern slope, among other shrubs and herbs with a dash of cereals. It was first discovered here in 1903 by V. I. Taliev.
