= Nasonovo =

Nasonovo Насоново
- Selo
- Location within Belgorod Oblast Location within Russia
- Coordinates: 50°15′N 38°13′E
- Country: Russia
- Region: Belgorod Oblast
- District: Valuysky District
- Time zone: UTC+3:00

Nasonovo (Russian: Насоново) is a rural locality (a selo) and the administrative center of Nasonovskoye Rural Settlement, Valuysky District, Belgorod Oblast, Russia. The population was 1,028 as of 2010. There are 17 streets.

== Geography ==
Nasonovo is located 15 km northeast of Valuyki (the district's administrative centre) by road. Bezgodovka is the nearest rural locality.
