= Dronovo, Belgorod Oblast =

Dronovo Дроново
- Selo
- Location within Belgorod Oblast Location within Russia
- Coordinates: 50°22′N 38°03′E
- Country: Russia
- Region: Belgorod Oblast
- District: Valuysky District
- Time zone: UTC+3:00

Dronovo (Russian: Дроново) is a rural locality (a selo) in Valuysky District, Belgorod Oblast, Russia. The population was 43 as of 2010. There are 3 streets.

== Geography ==
Dronovo is located 23 km north of Valuyki (the district's administrative centre) by road. Basovo is the nearest rural locality.
