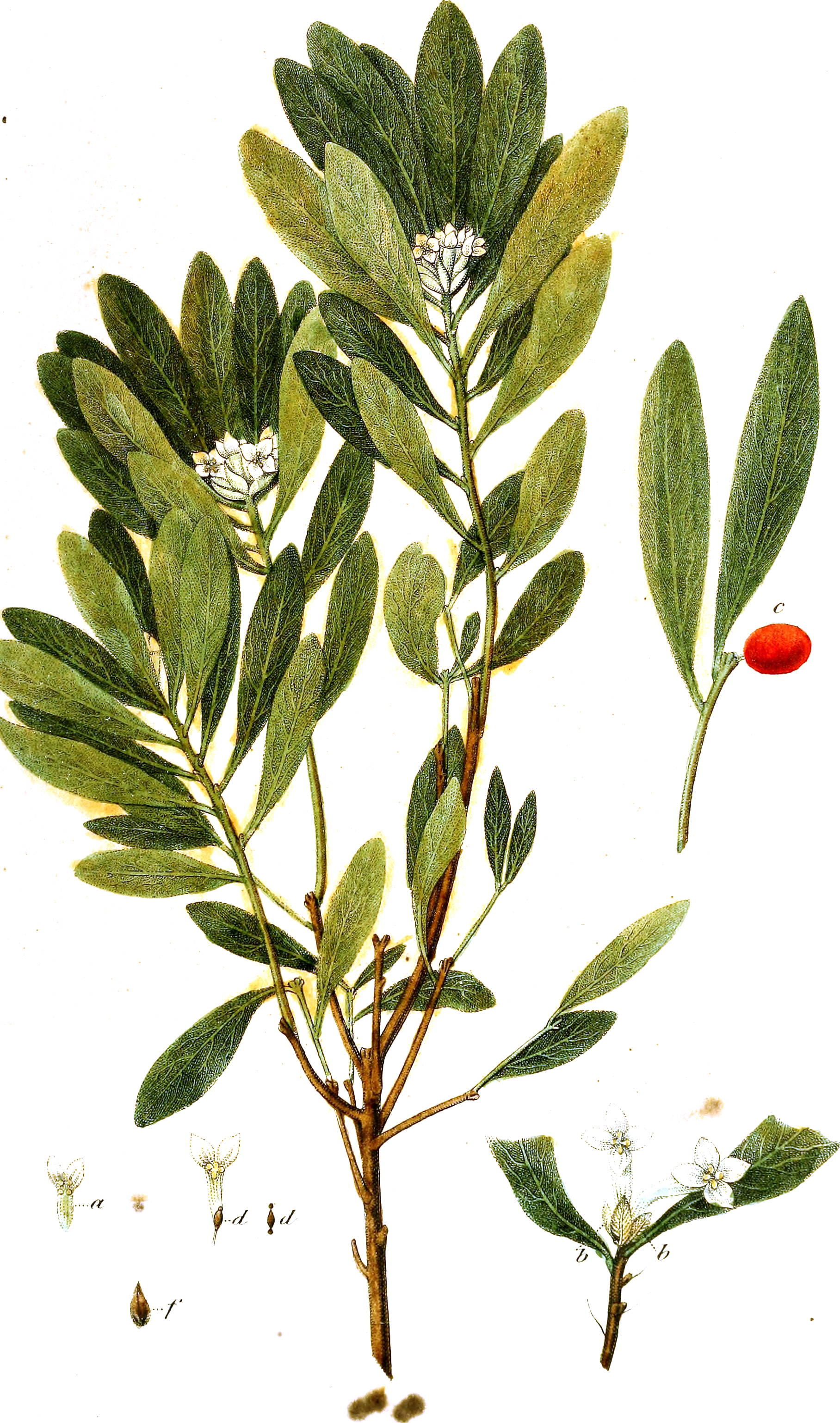

Conservation status
- Endangered (IUCN 3.1)

Scientific classification
- Kingdom: Plantae
- Clade: Tracheophytes
- Clade: Angiosperms
- Clade: Eudicots
- Clade: Rosids
- Order: Malvales
- Family: Thymelaeaceae
- Genus: Daphne
- Species: D. sophia

Binomial name
- Daphne sophia Kolenicz.

= Daphne sophia =

Species of shrub

Daphne sophia, also known as Sophia's daphne or Altai daphne, is a shrub of the family Thymelaeaceae. It is a relict endemic species with a fragmented range, found only in the Belgorod region of Russia and the Kharkiv region of Ukraine within the Central Russian Upland.

== Description ==
Daphne sophia grows to a height of 30 to 175 cm, in areas with steppe to forest vegetation, often on the fringes of forests. It flowers from May to July. The plant can reproduce vegetatively through root shoots. It grows in steppe to forest vegetation, often on the fringes of deciduous forests, particularly on chalky soils and limestone outcrops.

== Habitat and distribution ==
This species has a narrow, fragmented distribution limited to the Belgorod region of Russia (districts of Belgorod, Shebekino, Novy Oskol, Krasnogvardeysky, Valuysky, and Rovensky) and the Kharkiv region of Ukraine (Volchansky and Dvurechansky districts).

Within the Valuysky district of Belgorod region, the plant has been documented at several sites including near the village of Borki (in the "Urochishche Borki" reserve), near the village of Yablonovo, near the village of Staraya Simonovka, near the village of Kasyonovka, in the "Urochishche Gorodishche" state natural reserve near the villages of Pominovo and Kosaryovka, and in the "Urochishche Snizhennyye Alpy" state natural reserve near the village of Konoplanovka.

The plant typically grows on chalky slopes and ridges, often in the upper third of ravine slopes with southern exposure, along the edges of deciduous forests or under the canopy of oak, maple, linden, and hazel. Associated forest species include Quercus robur, Acer platanoides, Tilia cordata, Corylus avellana, and Euonymus verrucosa. The herbaceous layer where Daphne sophia grows often includes species such as Polygonatum odoratum, Convallaria majalis, and Viola collina. It prefers areas with steppe to forest vegetation, particularly on chalky soils and limestone outcrops of the Central Russian Upland.

== Conservation status ==
Daphne sophia is listed in the Red Data Books of the Russian Federation (2008) and Belgorod region (2019) with the conservation status "1 – species under threat of extinction". It is a highly vulnerable relict species requiring special protection measures.

The species is protected in several regional nature reserves in the Belgorod region, including "Urochishche Snizhennyye Alpy", "Urochishche Gorodishche", "Urochishche Borki", and others.
