= Khrapovo =

Khrapovo Храпово
- Selo
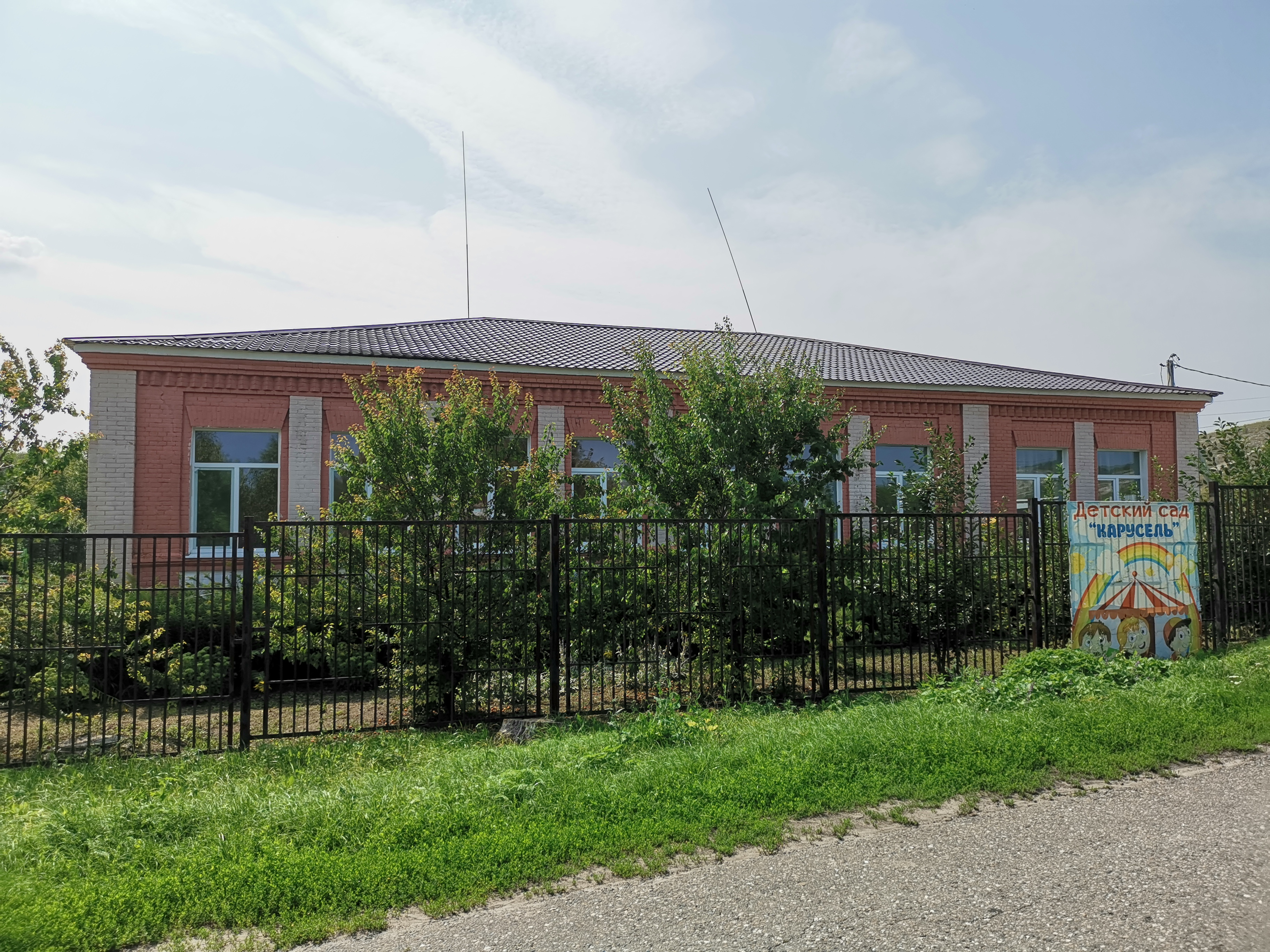

- Location within Belgorod Oblast Location within Russia
- Coordinates: 50°09′N 38°02′E
- Country: Russia
- Region: Belgorod Oblast
- District: Valuysky District
- Time zone: UTC+3:00

Khrapovo (Russian: Храпово) is a rural locality (a selo) in Valuysky District, Belgorod Oblast, Russia. The population was 260 as of 2010. There are 6 streets.

== Geography ==
Khrapovo is located 9 km southwest of Valuyki (the district's administrative centre) by road. Pristen is the nearest rural locality.
