= Verkhny Moisey =

Verkhny Moisey Верхний Моисей
- Selo
- Location within Belgorod Oblast Location within Russia
- Coordinates: 50°22′N 38°07′E
- Country: Russia
- Region: Belgorod Oblast
- District: Valuysky District
- Time zone: UTC+3:00

Verkhny Moisey (Russian: Верхний Моисей) is a rural locality (a selo) in Valuysky District, Belgorod Oblast, Russia. The population was 30 as of 2010. There are 2 streets.

== Geography ==
Verkhny Moisey is located 30 km north of Valuyki (the district's administrative centre) by road. Filippovo is the nearest rural locality.
