= Printsevka =

Printsevka Принцевка
- Selo
- Location within Belgorod Oblast Location within Russia
- Coordinates: 50°18′N 37°55′E
- Country: Russia
- Region: Belgorod Oblast
- District: Valuysky District
- Time zone: UTC+3:00

Printsevka (Russian: Принцевка) is a rural locality (a selo) and the administrative center of Printsevskoye Rural Settlement, Valuysky District, Belgorod Oblast, Russia. The population was 1,031 as of 2010. There are 12 streets.

== Geography ==
Printsevka is located 20 km northwest of Valuyki (the district's administrative centre) by road. Pominovo is the nearest rural locality.
