= Ovchinnikovo =

Ovchinnikovo Овчинниково
- Selo
- Location within Belgorod Oblast Location within Russia
- Coordinates: 50°19′N 37°53′E
- Country: Russia
- Region: Belgorod Oblast
- District: Valuysky District
- Time zone: UTC+3:00

Ovchinnikovo (Russian: Овчинниково) is a rural locality (a selo) in Valuysky District, Belgorod Oblast, Russia. The population was 117 as of 2010. There are 2 streets.

== Geography ==
Ovchinnikovo is located 22 km northwest of Valuyki (the district's administrative centre) by road. Printsevka is the nearest rural locality.
