= Rozhdestveno, Belgorod Oblast =

Rozhdestveno Рождествено
- Selo
- Location within Belgorod Oblast Location within Russia
- Coordinates: 50°13′N 38°10′E
- Country: Russia
- Region: Belgorod Oblast
- District: Valuysky District
- Time zone: UTC+3:00

Rozhdestveno (Russian: Рождествено) is a rural locality (a selo) in Valuysky District, Belgorod Oblast, Russia. The population was 1,499 as of 2010. There are 21 streets.

== Geography ==
Rozhdestveno is located 12 km northeast of Valuyki (the district's administrative centre) by road. Borisovo is the nearest rural locality.
