= Gerasimovka, Belgorod Oblast =

Gerasimovka Герасимовка
- Selo
- Location within Belgorod Oblast Location within Russia
- Coordinates: 50°02′N 38°08′E
- Country: Russia
- Region: Belgorod Oblast
- District: Valuysky District
- Time zone: UTC+3:00

Gerasimovka (Russian: Герасимовка) is a rural locality (a selo) and the administrative center of Gerasimovskoye Rural Settlement, Valuysky District, Belgorod Oblast, Russia. The population was 686 as of 2010. There are 7 streets.

== Geography ==
Gerasimovka is located 28 km south of Valuyki (the district's administrative centre) by road. Shvedunovka is the nearest rural locality.
