= Orekhovo, Belgorod Oblast =

Orekhovo Орехово
- Selo
- Location within Belgorod Oblast Location within Russia
- Coordinates: 50°12′N 37°58′E
- Country: Russia
- Region: Belgorod Oblast
- District: Valuysky District
- Time zone: UTC+3:00

Orekhovo (Russian: Орехово) is a rural locality (a selo) in Valuysky District, Belgorod Oblast, Russia. The population was 99 as of 2010. There are 4 streets.

== Geography ==
Orekhovo is located 15 km west of Valuyki (the district's administrative centre) by road. Sitnyanka is the nearest rural locality.
