= Krasnogvardeysky District =

Krasnogvardeysky District may refer to:

- Krasnogvardeysky District, Russia, several districts in Russia
- Krasnohvardiiske Raion (Krasnogvardeysky District), a district in Crimea
- Krasnohvardiiskyi District (Krasnogvardeysky District), until 2015, the name of Chechelivskyi District, a district of the city of Dnipropetrovsk in Dnipropetrovsk Oblast, Ukraine
- Chervonohvardiyskyi Raion (Krasnogvardeysky District), a district of the city of Makiivka, Donetsk Oblast, Ukraine

== See also ==
- Krasnogvardeysky (disambiguation)
