= Margarita Miglau =

Russian opera soprano

Margarita Aleksandrovna Miglau (Russian: Маргарита Александровна Миглау; 16 March 1926, Lezye – 18 March 2013, Moscow) was a Soviet and Russian opera soprano. One of her major roles was Cio-Cio-San in Madama Butterfly, which she performed 173 times at the Bolshoi Theatre. She also played the role of Varya in the premiere of The Story of a Real Man.

== Awards and honors ==
- Honored Artist of the RSFSR (1966)
- People's Artist of the RSFSR (1973)
- Order of the Red Banner of Labour (1976)
- Medal "Veteran of Labour" (1988)
