= Staraya Simonovka =

Staraya Simonovka Старая Симоновка
- Selo
- Location within Belgorod Oblast Location within Russia
- Coordinates: 50°11′N 38°03′E
- Country: Russia
- Region: Belgorod Oblast
- District: Valuysky District
- Time zone: UTC+3:00

Staraya Simonovka (Russian: Старая Симоновка) is a rural locality (a selo) in Valuysky District, Belgorod Oblast, Russia. The population was 225 as of 2010. There is 1 street.

== Geography ==
Staraya Simonovka is located 9 km southwest of Valuyki (the district's administrative centre) by road. Novaya Simonovka is the nearest rural locality.
