= Yarkoye =

Yarkoye may refer to:

- Yarkoye, Priozersky District, Leningrad Oblast, Russia
- Yarkoye, Dzhankoi Raion, Dzhankoi Raion, Crimea
- Yarkoye, Lenine Raion, Lenine Raion, Crimea
- Yarkoye, Saky Raion, Saky Raion, Crimea
