= Agoshevka =

Agoshevka Агошевка
- Selo
- Location within Belgorod Oblast Location within Russia
- Coordinates: 50°12′N 38°02′E
- Country: Russia
- Region: Belgorod Oblast
- District: Valuysky District
- Time zone: UTC+3:00

Agoshevka (Russian: Агошевка) is a rural locality (a selo) in Valuysky District, Belgorod Oblast, Russia. The population was 106 as of 2010. There are 6 streets.

== Geography ==
Agoshevka is located 6 km west of Valuyki (the district's administrative centre) by road. Yablonovo is the nearest rural locality.
