= Koloskovo, Belgorod Oblast =

Koloskovo Колосково
- Selo
- Location within Belgorod Oblast Location within Russia
- Coordinates: 50°14′N 37°59′E
- Country: Russia
- Region: Belgorod Oblast
- District: Valuysky District
- Time zone: UTC+3:00

Koloskovo (Russian: Колосково) is a rural locality (a selo) and the administrative center of Koloskovskoye Rural Settlement, Valuysky District, Belgorod Oblast, Russia. The population was 882 as of 2010. There are 11 streets.

== Geography ==
Koloskovo is located 11 km northwest of Valuyki (the district's administrative centre) by road. Lavy is the nearest rural locality.
