= Krivko =

Krivko Кривко
- Village
- Location within Leningrad Oblast Location within Russia
- Coordinates: 60°35′11″N 30°15′39″E
- Country: Russia
- Region: Leningrad Oblast
- District: Priozersky District
- Municipality: Sosnovskoye Rural Settlement
- Time zone: UTC+3:00

Krivko (Russian: Кривко) is a rural locality (a village) in Sosnovskoye Rural Settlement of Priozersky District, Leningrad Oblast, in northwest Russia. Population: 1,214 (2010 census); 1,208 (2002 census);
