= Viipurin maalaiskunta =

- Former municipality
- Coordinates: 60.8112°N 28.7298°E
- Country: Finland
- Established: 1869
- Ceded: 1944
- Time zone: UTC+2 (EET)
  - Summer (DST): UTC+3 (EEST)

Viipurin maalaiskunta, Swedish: Viborgs landskommun, is a former municipality in Finland. It consisted of the rural districts around the city of Viipuri. It was ceded to the Russian Soviet Federative Socialist Republic after Finland's defeat in the Winter War and the Continuation War in the 1940s.

== Villages in 1939 ==
Ahokas, Alasommee, Alasäiniö, Haankylä (also Haka), Hapenensaari, Hämäläinen, Ihantala, Juustila (also Juustilanjoki), Jyrkilä, Järvelä, Kaipola, Karppila, Kaukola, Kiiskilä, Kilpeenjoki, Kilpeenjoki–Sydänmaa, Kilpeenjoki–Vakkila, Konkkala, Korpelanautio, Kurikkala, Kähäri, Kärki, Kärstilä, Lahti, Lavola, Leppälä, Lihaniemi, Lyykylänjärvi, Mannikkala, Mälkki, Naulasaari, Nikoskela, Nuoraa, Näätälä, Pakkainen, Parkaus, Perojoensuu, Pien-Merijoki, Pietilä, Pihkala, Piispansaari, Porkansaari, Rapattila, Rasalahti, Repola–Lyykylä, Repola–Tervajoki, Rikkola, Ryysylä, Rääsiälä, Saarela, Samola, Savolainen, Suur-Merijoki, Suurpero, Tali, Terävälä, Tikkala, Tirhiä, Uskila, Uusikartano, Vahvaniemi, Vatikivi, Ventelä, Ykspää, Ylivesi, Yläsommee, Yläsäiniö
