= Krasnogvardeysky =

Krasnogvardeysky (masculine), Krasnogvardeyskaya (feminine), or Krasnogvardeyskoye (neuter) is something named after the Red Guards. It may refer to:

- Krasnogvardeysky District (disambiguation), in the countries of the former Soviet Union
- Krasnogvardeysky (rural locality) (Krasnogvardeyskaya, Krasnogvardeyskoye), name of several rural localities in Russia
- Krasnogvardeyskaya (Moscow Metro), a station of the Moscow Metro, Moscow, Russia
- Krasnogvardeyskaya, former name of Novocherkasskaya, a station of the St. Petersburg Metro, St. Petersburg, Russia

== See also ==
- Krasnogvardeysk, former name of Gatchina, a town in Gatchinsky District of Leningrad Oblast, Russia
