= Krasnogvardeysky District, Russia =

Krasnogvardeysky District is the name of several administrative and municipal districts in Russia. The districts are generally named for the Red Guards—paramilitary formations which took active part in the 1917 Russian Revolution and the Russian Civil War and later re-organized into the Red Army.

== Districts of the federal subjects ==
Federal subjects of Russia which have an entity called Krasnogvardeysky District (the Republic of Crimea is not shown)

- Krasnogvardeysky District, Republic of Adygea, an administrative and municipal district of the Republic of Adygea
- Krasnogvardeysky District, Belgorod Oblast, an administrative and municipal district of Belgorod Oblast
- Krasnogvardeysky District, Republic of Crimea, an administrative and municipal district in the Republic of Crimea (located on the Crimean Peninsula, which is disputed between Russia and Ukraine)
- Krasnogvardeysky District, Orenburg Oblast, an administrative and municipal district of Orenburg Oblast
- Krasnogvardeysky District, Saint Petersburg, an administrative district of the federal city of St. Petersburg
- Krasnogvardeysky District, Stavropol Krai, an administrative and municipal district of Stavropol Krai

== Renamed districts ==
- Krasnogvardeysky District, name of Gatchinsky District of Leningrad Oblast in 1929–1944

== Historical districts ==
- Krasnogvardeysky District, Moscow (1969–1991), a district of Moscow

== See also ==
- Krasnogvardeysky (disambiguation)
