= Lake Glubokoye (Karelian Isthmus) =

Lake in Leningrad, Russia

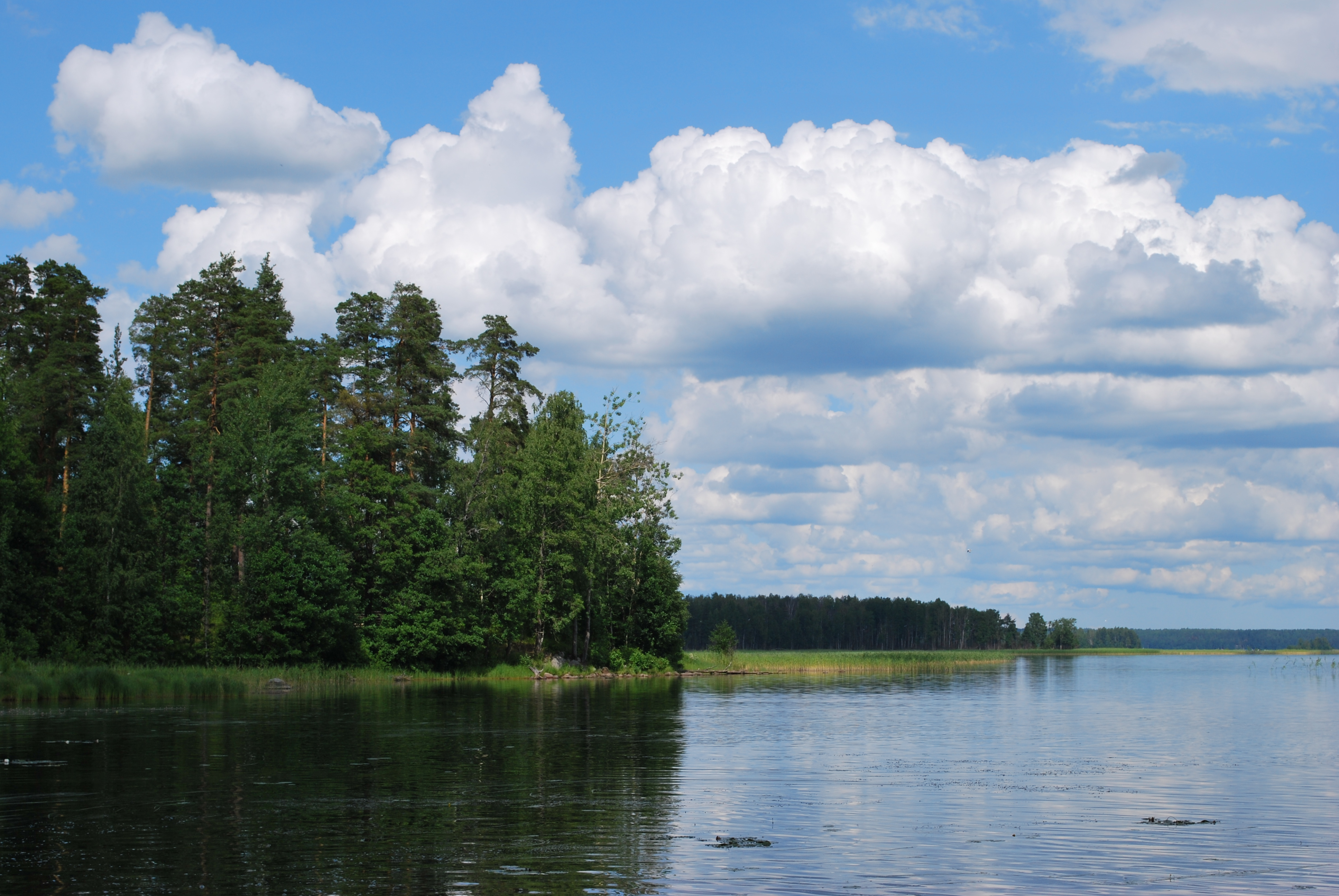

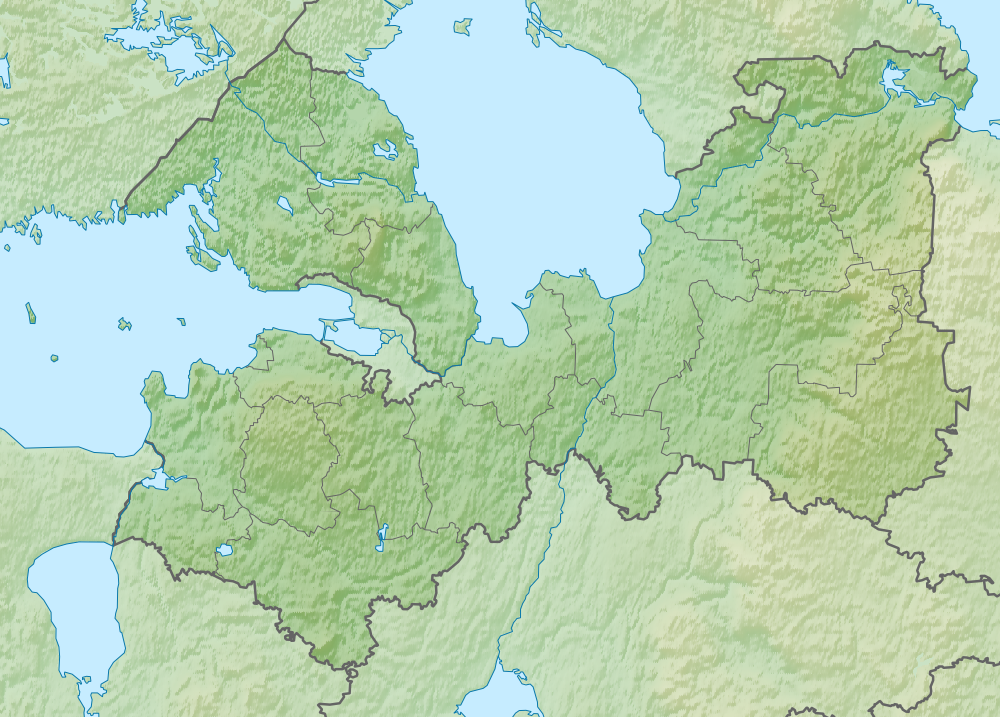
- Location within Leningrad Oblast
- Location: Vyborgsky District, Leningrad Oblast
- Coordinates: 60°33′19″N 29°18′44″E
- Catchment area: 213 square kilometres (82 mi^{2})
- Basin countries: Russia
- Surface area: 37.9 square kilometres (14.6 mi^{2})

Lake Glubokoye (Russian: о́зеро Глубо́кое, lit. Deep Lake; Finnish: Muolaanjärvi) is a lake on Karelian Isthmus, in Vyborgsky District of Leningrad Oblast. The nearby larger settlements are Kirillovskoye (18 km) and Baryshevo (38 km). The area of the lake is 37.9 square kilometres (14.6 mi^{2}), and the area of its drainage basin is 213 square kilometres (82 mi^{2}).

The lake is connected by an unnamed channel with Lake Bolshoye Rakovoye, located several kilometers northeast. In its turn, Lake Bolshoye Rakovoye is the source of the Bulatnaya River, which flows into the southern branch of the Vuoksi River. The whole system belongs to the basin of Lake Ladoga and the Neva River.

The catchment area of the lake is relatively small due to the hilly landscape of the Karelian Isthmus. The two main inflows, the Bolotnitsa River and the Ostrovyanka River, both flow in the southeastern direction. There are several islands on the lake, the largest of them is Bolshoy Steregushchy Island in the northwestern part of the lake. The lake is elongated in the southeastern direction, with a narrow bay in the southeast, known as Zagorsky Bay.

There are five rural localities;Glubokoye, Staroselye, Nagornoye, Gribnoye, and Streltsovo, on the lakeshore. Gribnoye and Streltsovo are located on the A122 railroad, connecting them to Vyborg.
