= Brusnichnoye =

Brusnichnoye Russian: Брусничное Finnish: Juustila
- Village
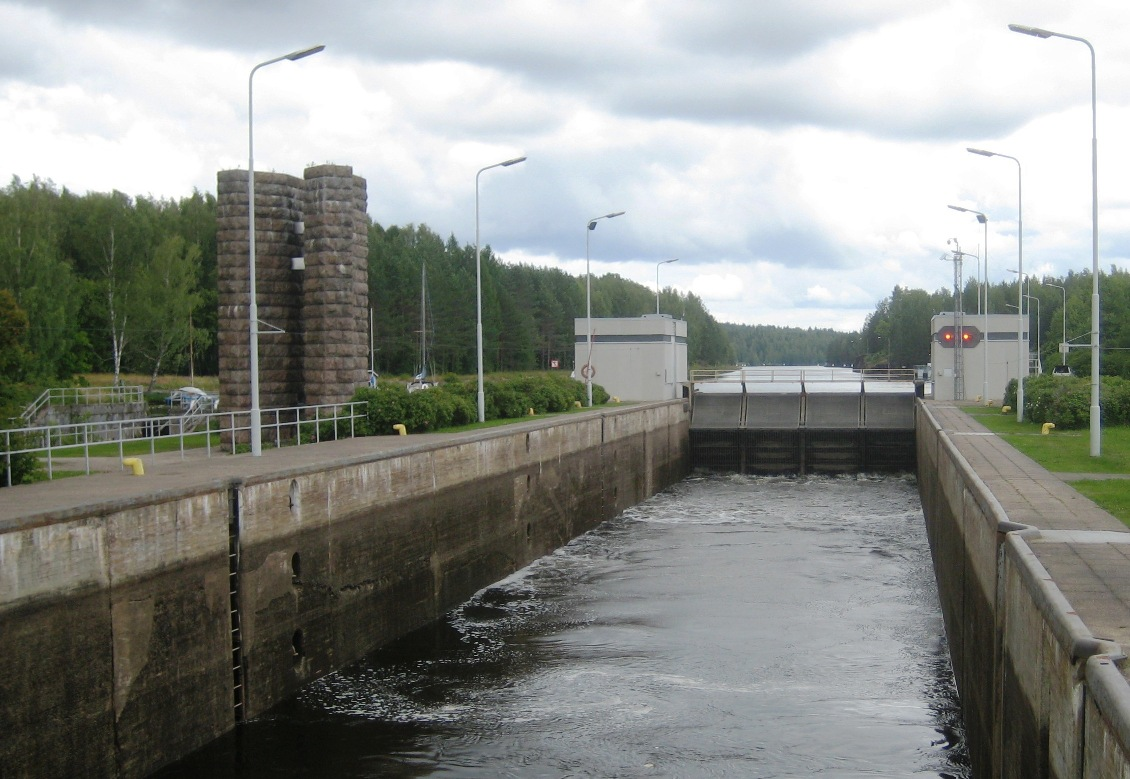
- Monument to friendship at the Brusnichnoye lock along the Saimaa Canal

- Location within Leningrad Oblast
- Coordinates: 60.8038°N 28.7223°E
- Country: Russia
- Federal subject: Leningrad Oblast
- District: Vyborgsky District
- Time zone: UTC+2 (EET)
  - Summer (DST): UTC+3 (EEST)

Brusnichnoye (Russian: Брусничное; formerly known as Finnish name Juustila, Finnish: [ˈjuːstilɑ]) is a village located along the Saimaa Canal on the shores of Lake Zaliv Novinski, about 16 kilometres (9.9 mi) north of Vyborg in Leningrad Oblast, Russia. It is one of the villages ceded to the Soviet Union after World War II; before that, it was part of Viipurin maalaiskunta ("Vyborg rural municipality"). The village's current Russian name was adopted in 1948.

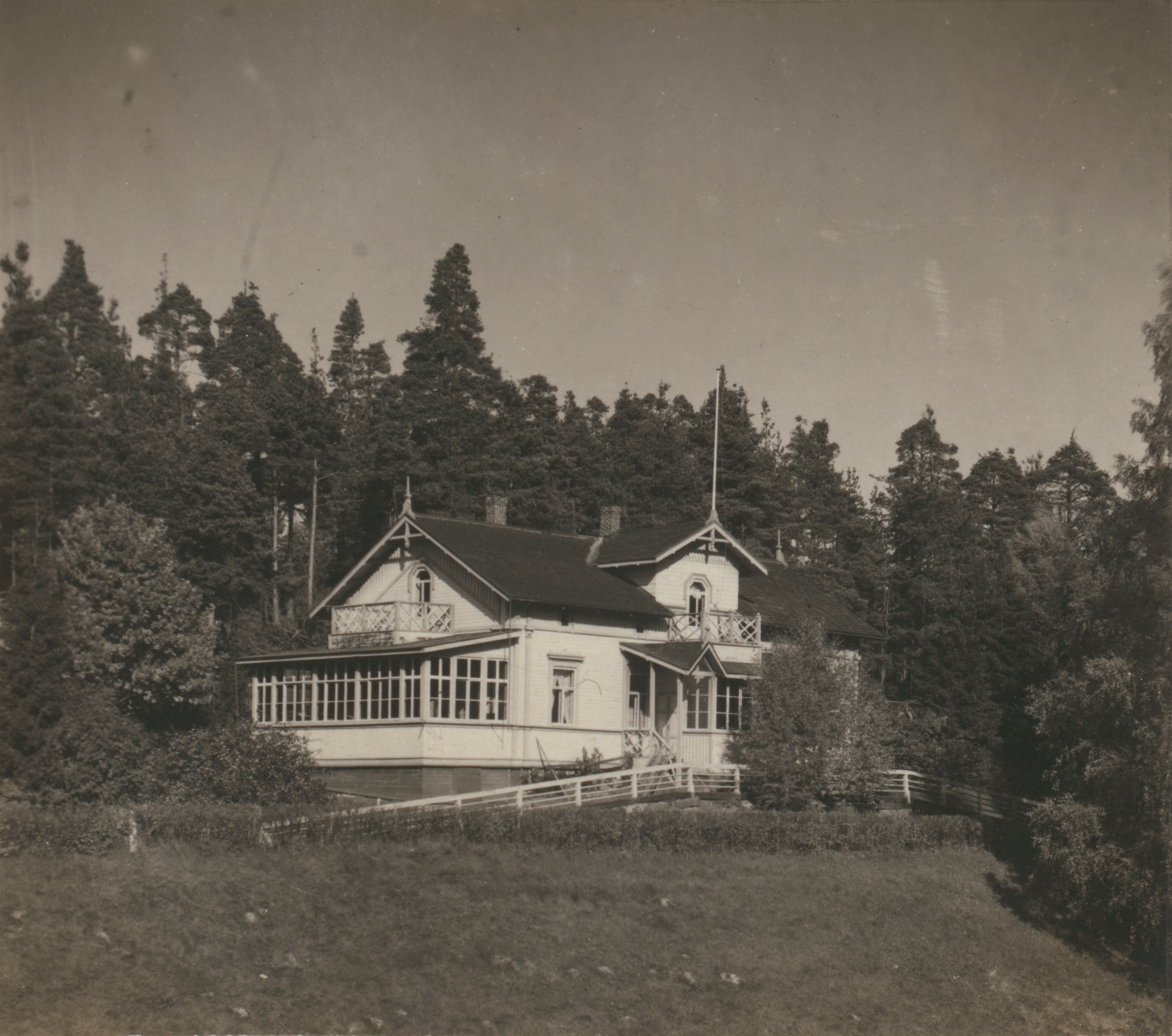
A hotel in the early 20th century

When the village was known as Juustila, it was one of the largest villages in the rural municipality in terms of population; in 1937 it had 922 inhabitants. Juustila had a hotel, a health spa and several shops. A youth club also operated in Juustila. In 1937, the village of Juustila had 476 hectares (1,180 acres) of fields, 44 hectares (110 acres) of meadows, and 1.545 hectares (3.82 acres) of forest. Juustila Folk School, founded in 1891, had four teachers and 126 students in 1939. An additional building was built for the school in 1927.

The family of Bishop Paulus Juusten, who lived in the 16th century, owned the Juustila farm and took its name from it.

== See also ==
- List of rural localities in Leningrad Oblast
- Viipurin maalaiskunta

== Sources ==
=== Further reading ===
- Kuujo, Erkki; Lakio, Matti (1982). Viipurin pitäjän historia II (in Finnish). Helsinki: Viipurin maalaiskuntalaisten pitäjäseura ry.

== See also ==
Media related to Brusnichnoye at Wikimedia Commons
