= Platforma 69-y km =

Platforma 69-y km Платформа 69-й км
- Settlement
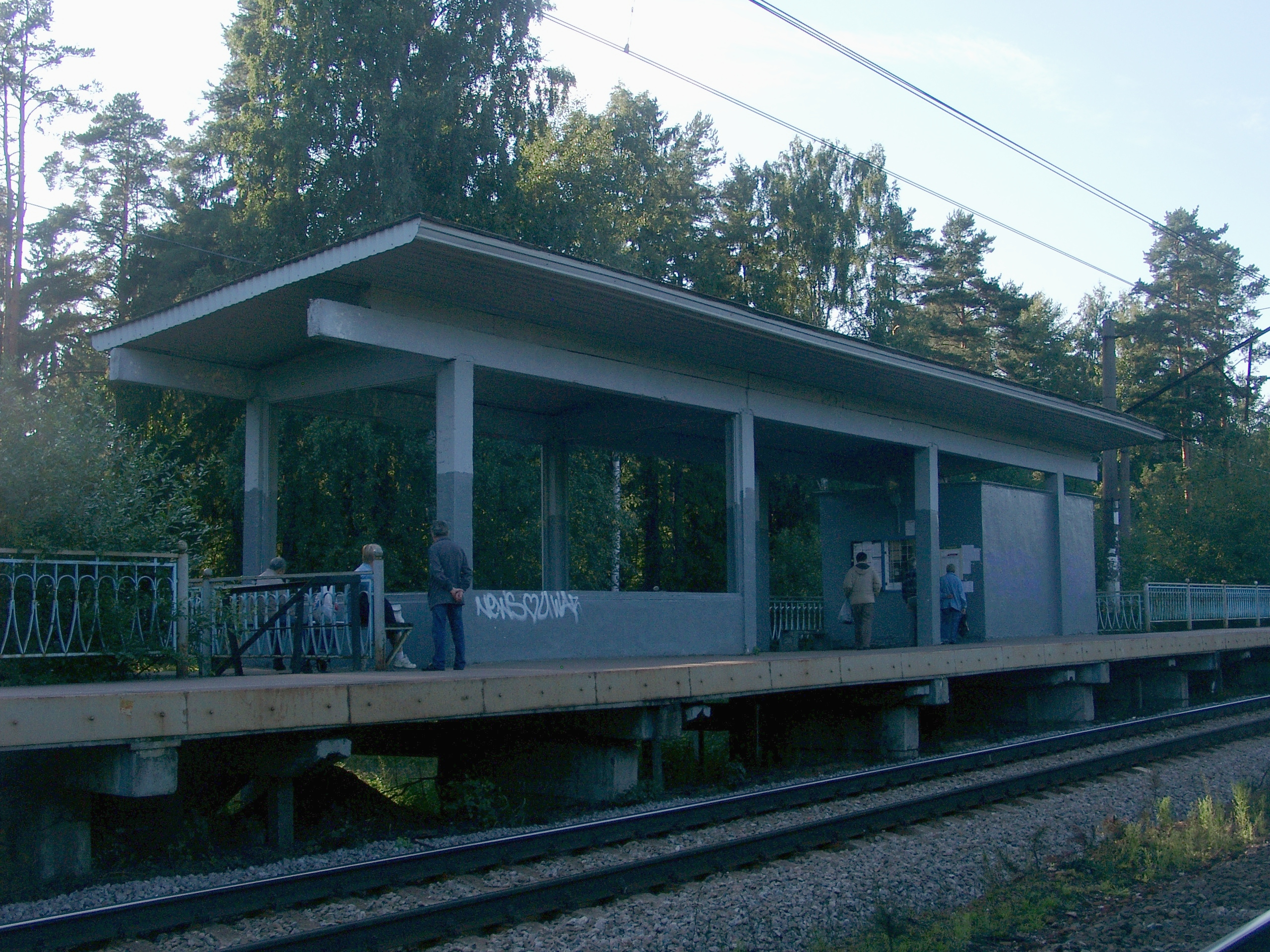

- Location within Leningrad Oblast Location within Russia
- Coordinates: 60°30′36″N 30°13′47″E
- Country: Russia
- Region: Leningrad Oblast
- District: Priozersky District
- Municipality: Sosnovskoye Rural Settlement
- Time zone: UTC+3:00

Platforma 69-y km (Russian: Платформа 69-й км; Finnish: Kelliö) is a rural locality (a settlement) in Sosnovskoye Rural Settlement of Priozersky District, Leningrad Oblast, of northwest Russia. Population: 288 (2010 census); 380 (2002 census);
