= Saimaa Canal =

Transportation canal in Finland

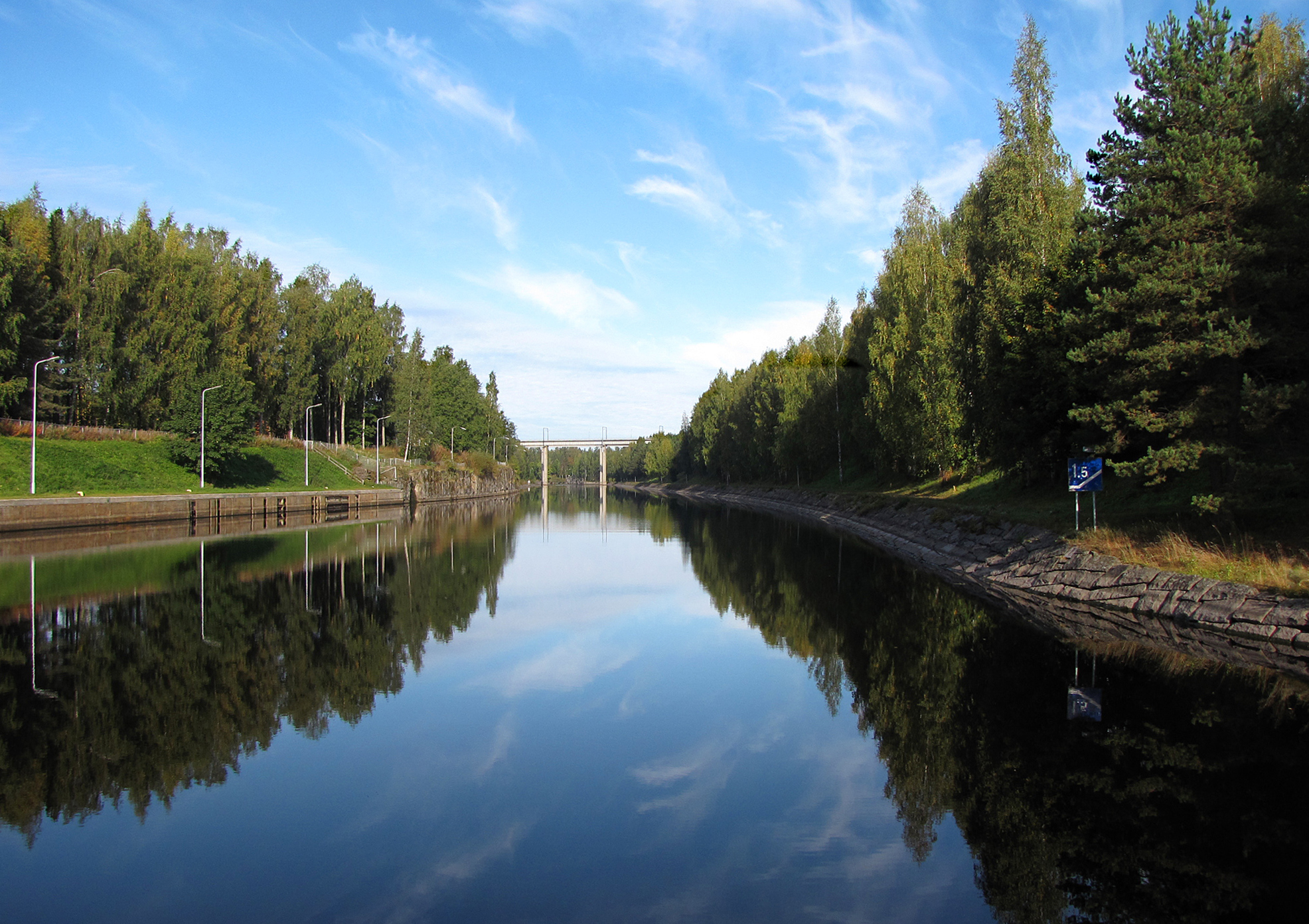
- Saimaa Canal
- Interactive map of Saimaa Canal

Specifications
- Length: 42.9 km (27 mi)
- Maximum boat length: 82.5 m (271 ft)
- Maximum boat beam: 12.6 m (41 ft)
- Maximum boat draft: 4.35 m (14.3 ft)
- Maximum boat air draft: 24.5 m (80 ft)
- Locks: 8

History
- Construction began: 1845
- Date completed: 1856

Geography
- Start point: lake Saimaa, Finland
- End point: Gulf of Finland near Vyborg, Russia

Course of the canal

The Saimaa Canal (Finnish: Saimaan kanava; Swedish: Saima kanal; Russian: Сайменский канал) is a transportation canal that connects lake Saimaa with the Gulf of Finland near Vyborg, Russia. The canal was built from 1845 to 1856 and opened on 7 September [O.S. 26 August] 1856. It was overhauled and widened in 1963–1968.

A system of inland waterways and canals in the 120 interconnected lakes of the south-central and south-east part of Finland (Finnish Lakeland) are reached through the canal. The network of deep channels in Lake Saimaa with at least a draught of 4.2 m (14 ft) covers 814 km (506 mi). The deep channels extend all the way to Kuopio in Central Finland. The canal is closed in the winter.

== Topography ==
The canal begins near Lauritsala, Lappeenranta, Finland, at coordinates (61°04′43″N 028°16′24″E) and ends in Vyborg, Russia, at coordinates (60°48′38″N 028°44′13″E), connecting Lake Saimaa and the Vyborg Bay. On the way, it connects Lake Nuijamaa, on the Finnish–Russian border at coordinates (60°57′6″N 28°34′33″E), and three smaller lakes in Russia.

=== Dimensions ===
- Length: 42.9 km (26.7 mi)
  - Finnish part: 23.3 km (14.5 mi)
  - Russian part: 19.6 km (12.2 mi)
- Width: from 34 to 55 m (112 to 180 ft)
- Total lift from the Gulf of Finland to Lake Saimaa: 75.7 m (248 ft)
- The "Saimax" specification, in analogy to Panamax, specifies the maximum size and required equipment. The maximum dimensions allowed for a ship transiting the canal are:
  - Length: 82.5 m (271 ft)
  - Beam (width): 12.6 m (41 ft)
  - Draft: 4.35 m (14.3 ft)
  - Height of mast: 24.5 m (80 ft)
  - Other requirements include for example that trading vessels must have two VHF radios and an automatic identification system (AIS).
- 217 boundary pillars between Canal Rented Zone and main territory of Russia.

=== Locks ===
There are a total of eight locks on the canal, raising the water level by some 250 ft (76 m): the upper three locks in the Finnish part of the canal, and the lower five locks situated on the Russian side of the border:

Locks on the Saimaa Canal
No.	Name	Meters	Feet	Coordinate	Country
1	Brusnichnoye (Russian); Juustila (Finnish)	10.0	33	60.810667°N 28.737316°E	Russia
2	Iskrovka (Russian); Särkijärvi (Finnish)	11.4	37	60.832155°N 28.73661°E	Russia
3	Tsvetochnoye (Russian); Rättijärvi (Finnish)	5.5	18	60.881817°N 28.650756°E	Russia
4	Ilistoye (Russian); Lietjärvi (Finnish)	10.2	33	60.893306°N 28.622904°E	Russia
5	Pälli	11.7	38	60.907227°N 28.615179°E	Russia
6	Soskua	8.3	27	61°02′23″N 028°24′02″E	Finland
7	Mustola	7.3	24	61°03′45″N 028°18′59″E	Finland
8	Mälkiä	12.4	41	61°04′15″N 028°18′14″E	Finland

Mälkiä Lock has the highest lift (12.4 m, 41 ft), Tsvetochnoye Lock has the lowest (5.5 m, 18 ft).

=== Bridges ===
The canal crosses

- 12 motor vehicles bridges:
  - 6 of them in Finland – 3 movable and 3 immovable
  - the other 6 in Russia – 4 movable and 2 immovable
- 2 railroad bridges (one on the each side of the border), both of them are immovable.

== History ==
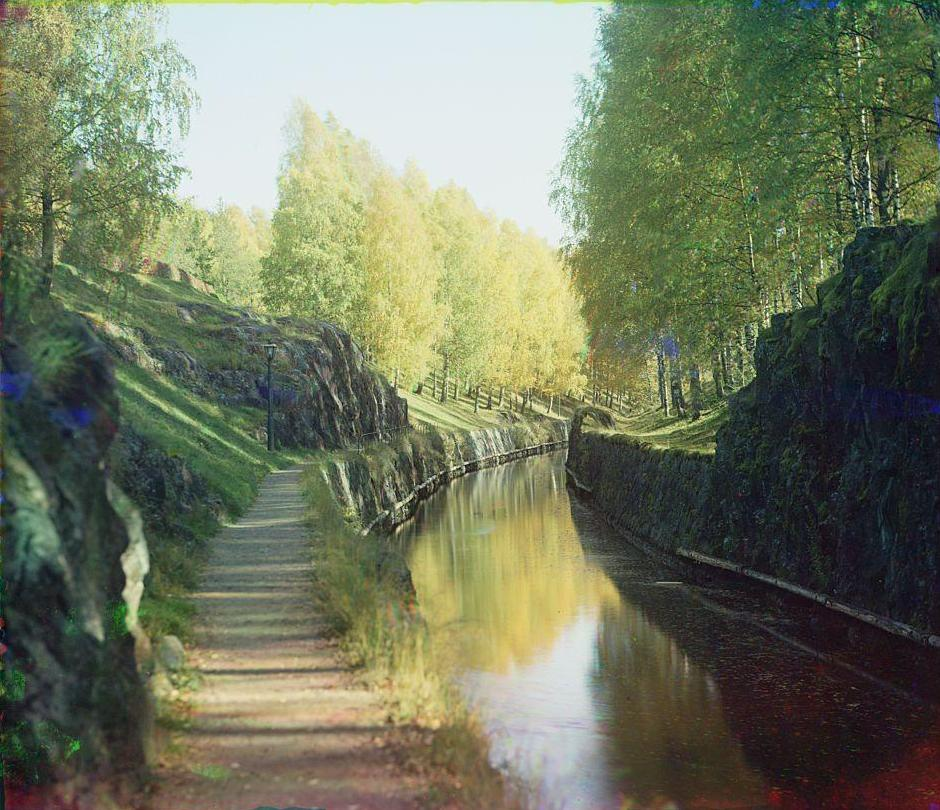
Saimaa Canal in 1903, photo by Prokudin-Gorskii

The canal, inaugurated in 1856, was built between the cities of Lappeenranta and Viipuri (now part of Russia), both of them then in the autonomous Grand Duchy of Finland in the Russian Empire.

In the Moscow Peace Treaty of 1940, Finland ceded the Karelian Isthmus and Vyborg to the Soviet Union; control of the canal was divided and traffic ended.

Finland obtained a 50-year lease on the Soviet part of the canal and Maly Vysotsky Island (Ravansaari) in 1963. Finland constructed a deeper 42.9 kilometres (26.7 mi) canal, which opened in 1968. The annual rent during this lease increased only once.

In 2010, Finland obtained a second 50-year lease from Russia, starting in 2013. Maly Vysotsky was not included in the new lease. Negotiations in 2008 had raised the annual rent from €290,000 to €1.22 million, with revisions every 10 years. The new agreement went into effect on 17 February 2012.

Regulations pertaining to maritime rules and employment of canal staff fall under Finnish jurisdiction; in all other cases Russian laws apply. Passports are required at the international boundaries, but Russian visas are not required for just passing through the canal.

In 2024–2025, the canal remained open to Finnish ships despite Finland abandoning its traditional neutrality and joining NATO. However, many insurance companies have refused to cover ships and cargo moving through the Saimaa Canal, resulting in the transportation artery losing its importance.
