= Sverdlovo, Leningrad Oblast =

Rural locality in Vyborgsky District, Russia

Coordinates: 60°36′16″N 28°49′28″E

Sverdlovo (Russian: Свердло́во; Finnish: Ylä-Somme), called Ylä-Somme before 1948 and Novoselye (Новосе́лье) in 1948–1949, is a rural locality on Karelian Isthmus, in Vyborgsky District of Leningrad Oblast.
