= Valdost =

Valdost Валдость
- Village
- Interactive map of Valdost
- Location of Valdost Valdost (Leningrad Oblast)
- Coordinates: 59°51′10″N 33°16′51″E
- Country: Russia
- Federal subject: Leningrad Oblast
- Administrative district: Tikhvinsky District
- Elevation: 131 m (430 ft)

Population
  - Estimate (2017): 14 )
- Time zone: UTC+3 (MSK)
- Postal code: 187511
- OKTMO ID: 41645416106

Valdost (Russian: Валдость) is a rural locality (a village) in Tikhvinsky District of Leningrad Oblast, Russia, located on Lake Bolshaya Valdost at a height of 131 meters (430 ft) above sea level.
