= Orekhovo, Altai Krai =

Orekhovo Орехово
- Selo
- Location within Altai Krai Location within Russia
- Coordinates: 53°07′N 78°12′E
- Country: Russia
- Region: Altai Krai
- District: Burlinsky District
- Time zone: UTC+7:00

Orekhovo (Russian: Орехово) is a rural locality (a selo) and the administrative center of Orekhovsky Selsoviet, Burlinsky District, Altai Krai, Russia. The population was 540 as of 2013. It was founded in 1910. There are 4 streets.

== Geography ==
Orekhovo is located 27 km southwest of Burla (the district's administrative centre) by road. Tsvetopol and Chernavka are the nearest rural localities.
