= Ivanovo, Petushinsky District, Vladimir Oblast =

Ivanovo Иваново
- Village
- Location within Vladimir Oblast Location within Russia
- Coordinates: 55°56′N 39°12′E
- Country: Russia
- Region: Vladimir Oblast
- District: Petushinsky District
- Time zone: UTC+3:00

Ivanovo (Russian: Иваново) is a rural locality (a village) in Nagornoye Rural Settlement, Petushinsky District, Vladimir Oblast, Russia. The population was 94 as of 2010. There are 6 streets.

== Geography ==
Ivanovo is located 20 km northwest of Petushki (the district's administrative centre) by road. Mashinostroitel is the nearest rural locality.
