= Lezye =

Rural locality in Kirovsky District, Russia

Coordinates: 59°41′11″N 31°06′20″E

Lezye (Russian: Ле́зье) is a village in Mginskoye Urban Settlement, Leningrad Oblast, Russia. Population: 98 (2010 census);
