= Krasnogvardeysky, Altai Krai =

Krasnogvardeysky Красногвардейский
- Settlement
- Location within Altai Krai Location within Russia
- Coordinates: 51°12′N 82°10′E
- Country: Russia
- Region: Altai Krai
- District: Zmeinogorsky District
- Time zone: UTC+7:00

Krasnogvardeysky (Russian: Красногвардейский) is a rural locality (a settlement) in Cherepanovsky Selsoviet, Zmeinogorsky District, Altai Krai, Russia. The population was 1 as of 2013. There is 1 street.

== Geography ==
Krasnogvardeysky is located 6 km north of Zmeinogorsk (the district's administrative centre) by road. Zmeinogorsk is the nearest rural locality.
