= Lampovo =

Lampovo Лампово
- Urban-type settlement
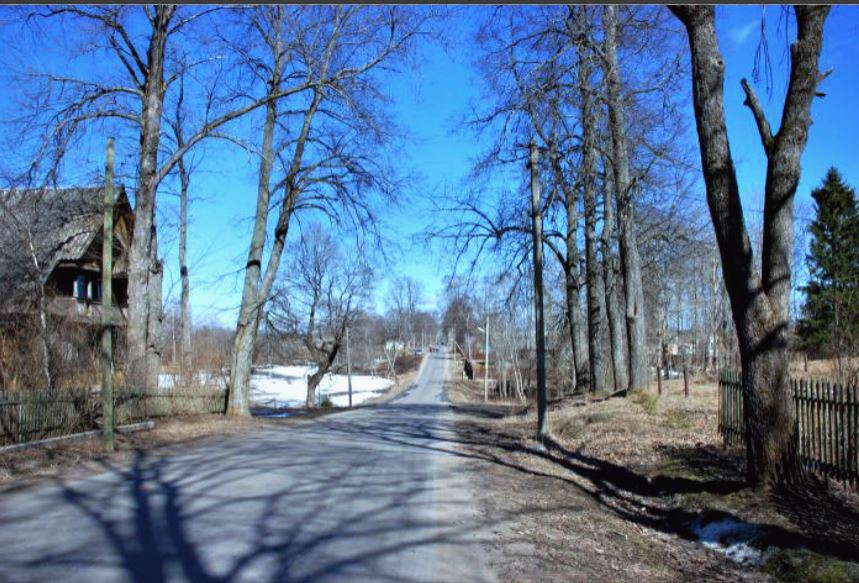
- A street in Lampovo, Russia.
- Interactive map of Lampovo
- Location of Lampovo Lampovo (Leningrad Oblast)
- Coordinates: 59°17′N 30°04′E
- Country: Russia
- Federal subject: Leningrad Oblast

Population (2010 Census)
  - Total: 1,487
  - Estimate (2017): 1,460 (−1.8%)

Municipal status
  - Municipal district: Gatchinsky District
- Time zone: UTC+3 (MSK)
- Postal code: 188336
- OKTMO ID: 41618156126

Lampovo (Russian: Лампово) is a holiday village located in Gatchinsky District, Leningrad Oblast, Russia. Its geographical coordinates are 59° 17' 0" N, 30° 4' 0" E.

It has a population of 1487 people (2010 census) The center of the town is 97 meters above sea level.

== History ==
The name Lampovo goes back to the Ingrian word "lyamppi", which means "a lively, lively place." This name was first mentioned by Tsarevich Alexei, in 1770, who owned this area. Over time, like many Finnish names of surrounding villages, Lamppi transformed into Lampovo.

In the beginning of the 18th century, the first settlers arrived in this village, the natives of the Arkhangelsk and Vologda oblasts.

The peasants of the village of Lampovo were ranked in the parish of the Orlyna Savior-Transfiguration Church. The Chapel of St. Nicholas the Wonderworker was constructed in Lampovo, located near the Lampovsky cemetery. Precise information about the closing time of the church in Lampovo has not been preserved, but indirect evidence indicates that it operated until the end of the 1920s.

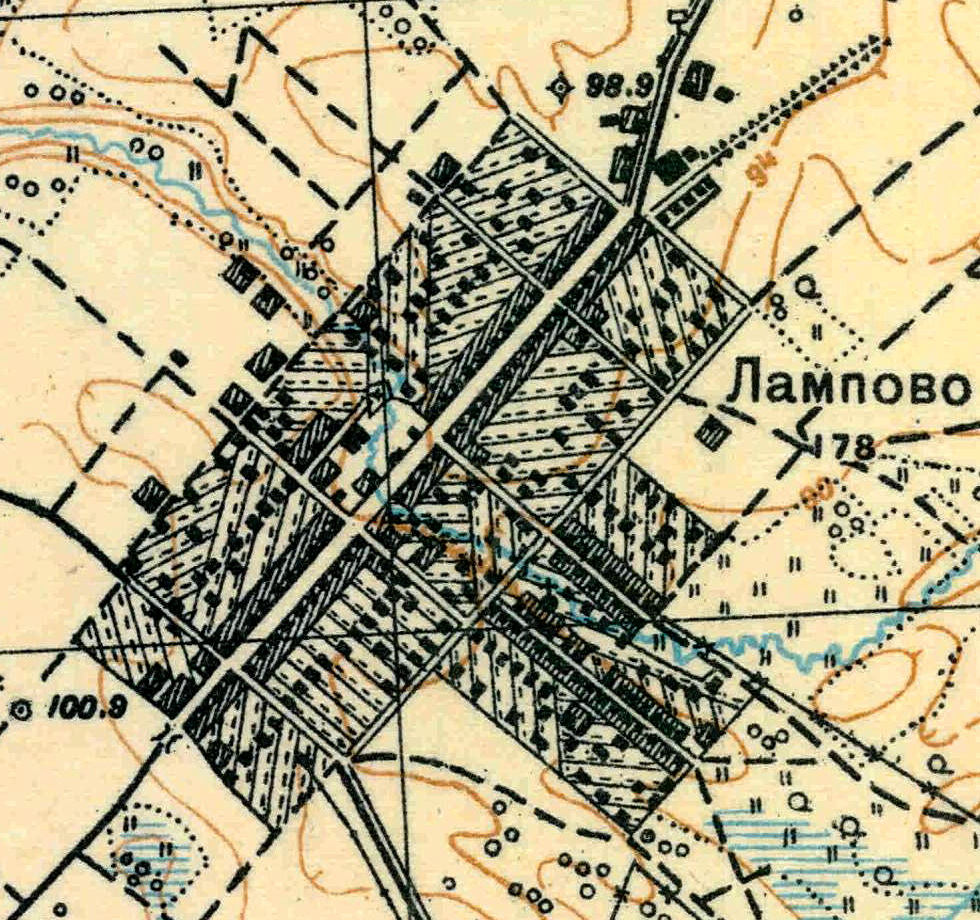
Lampovo village plan in 1931

The present community in Lampovo is made up of holiday housing.

== Transport ==
Buses 120-T, 505, 506, 506A, 507 from Siversky are available.

There is a train station located 1 kilometer west from the village.

== Attractions ==
- The Chapel of St. Nicholas
- "Pavlov's House" - a monument of wooden architecture built in 1863.
