= Orekhovo (settlement), Leningrad Oblast =

Orekhovo Орехово
- Settlement
- Location within Leningrad Oblast Location within Russia
- Coordinates: 60°27′54″N 30°15′51″E
- Country: Russia
- Region: Leningrad Oblast
- District: Priozersky District
- Municipality: Sosnovskoye Rural Settlement
- Time zone: UTC+3:00

Orekhovo (Russian: Орехово; Finnish: Raasuli) is a rural locality (a settlement) in Sosnovskoye Rural Settlement of Priozersky District, Leningrad Oblast, of northwest Russia. Population: 466 (2010 census); 57 (2002 census);
