= Ivanovo, Priozersky District, Leningrad Oblast =

Ivanovo Иваново
- Village
- Location within Leningrad Oblast Location within Russia
- Coordinates: 60°31′33″N 30°11′23″E
- Country: Russia
- Region: Leningrad Oblast
- District: Priozersky District
- Municipality: Sosnovskoye Rural Settlement
- Time zone: UTC+3:00

Ivanovo (Russian: Иваново) is a rural locality (a village) in Sosnovskoye Rural Settlement of Priozersky District, Leningrad Oblast, in northwest Russia. Population: 32 (2010 census); 19 (2002 census);
