= Ivanovo, Cherepovetsky District, Vologda Oblast =

Ivanovo Иваново
- Village
- Location within Vologda Oblast Location within Russia
- Coordinates: 59°30′N 37°25′E
- Country: Russia
- Region: Vologda Oblast
- District: Cherepovetsky District
- Time zone: UTC+3:00

Ivanovo (Russian: Иваново) is a rural locality (a village) in Voskresenskoye Rural Settlement, Cherepovetsky District, Vologda Oblast, Russia. The population was 11 as of 2002.

== Geography ==
Ivanovo is located 71 km (44 mi) northwest of Cherepovets (the district's administrative centre) by road. Gorely Pochinok is the nearest rural locality.
