= Orekhovo (village), Leningrad Oblast =

Orekhovo Орехово
- Village
- Location within Leningrad Oblast Location within Russia
- Coordinates: 60°29′01″N 30°14′04″E
- Country: Russia
- Region: Leningrad Oblast
- District: Priozersky District
- Municipality: Sosnovskoye Rural Settlement
- Time zone: UTC+3:00

Orekhovo (Russian: Орехово) is a rural locality (a village) in Sosnovskoye Rural Settlement of Priozersky District, Leningrad Oblast, in northwest Russia. Population: 14 (2010 census); 3 (2002 census);
