= Voiskovitsy =

- Village
- Location within Leningrad Oblast Location within European Russia
- Coordinates: 59°31′44″N 29°57′32″E
- Country]: Russia
- Federal subject: Leningrad Oblast
- District: Gatchinsky

Population (2018)
  - Total: 239

Voiskovitsy (Russian: Войсковицы) is a village in Gatchinsky District Leningrad Oblast. It is part of Syaskelevsky rural settlement.
