= Krasnogvardeyskoye, Stavropol Krai =

Krasnogvardeyskoye Красногвардейское
- Selo
- Interactive map of Krasnogvardeyskoye
- Location of Krasnogvardeyskoye Krasnogvardeyskoye (Stavropol Krai)
- Coordinates: 45°51′N 41°31′E
- Country: Russia
- Federal subject: Stavropol Krai
- Administrative district: Krasnogvardeysky District
- Founded: 1803

Population (2010 Census)
  - Total: 15,992
  - Estimate (2023): 13,959 (−12.7%)

Administrative status
  - Capital of: Krasnogvardeysky District
- Time zone: UTC+3 (MSK)
- Postal code: 356031
- OKTMO ID: 07630407101

Krasnogvardeyskoye (Russian: Красногварде́йское) is a rural locality (a selo) and the administrative center of Krasnogvardeysky District of Stavropol Krai, Russia. Population: 15,992 (2010 census); 30,801 (2002 census); 14,769 (1989 Soviet census).
