= Ivanovo, Kovrovsky District, Vladimir Oblast =

Ivanovo Иваново
- Selo
- Location within Vladimir Oblast Location within Russia
- Coordinates: 56°10′N 41°28′E
- Country: Russia
- Region: Vladimir Oblast
- District: Kovrovsky District
- Time zone: UTC+3:00

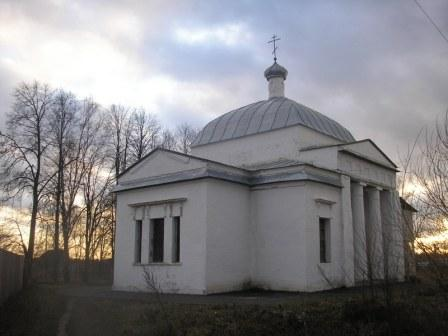
Church of the Nativity of the Theotokos in Ivanovo-Esino, 2008

Ivanovo (Russian: Иваново) is a rural locality (a selo) and the administrative center of Ivanovskoye Rural Settlement, Kovrovsky District, Vladimir Oblast, Russia. The population was 1,808 as of 2010. There are 16 streets.

== Geography ==
Ivanovo is located 32 km south of Kovrov (the district's administrative centre) by road. Pavlovskoye is the nearest rural locality.
