= Koloskovo, Leningrad Oblast =

Koloskovo Колосково
- Settlement
- Location within Leningrad Oblast Location within Russia
- Coordinates: 60°34′59″N 30°11′43″E
- Country: Russia
- Region: Leningrad Oblast
- District: Priozersky District
- Municipality: Sosnovskoye Rural Settlement
- Time zone: UTC+3:00

Koloskovo (Russian: Колосково; Finnish: Luukkolanmäki) is a rural locality (a settlement) in Sosnovskoye Rural Settlement of Priozersky District, Leningrad Oblast, of northwest Russia. Population: 177 (2010 census); 42 (2002 census);

Luukkolanmäki was first mentioned in 1631 as Ludian Mäkj. In 1644, it was mentioned as Luckan Mäckij and in 1768 as Lukolanmäki. According to Saulo Kepsu, the forms with Ludian contain the Orthodox given name Lukyan/Lutyan (a person with this name, Lwdian Rydz, was mentioned in 1613 in the nearby village of Leinikylä), while the latter forms are derived from the name Luka.

Before the Winter and Continuation Wars, Luukkolanmäki was a village in the Finnish municipality of Rautu. The name (Луукколанмяки) remained in official Soviet use until the winter of 1948, when it was renamed Zamkovo, from замок meaning 'lock', due to a misinterpretation of the Finnish name as containing the word lukko meaning the same. Less than six months later, it was renamed to Russkaya, and on 13 January 1949 to Koloskovo, after sergeant A. P. Koloskov who had died nearby in 1944 and was buried in the village. The original Koloskovo was abandoned soon after, but the name was repurposed for a nearby settlement around the 78 km railway platform.
