= Avdetovo =

Avdetovo Авдетово
- Village
- Location within Leningrad Oblast Location within Russia
- Coordinates: 59°20′N 32°31′E
- Country: Russia
- Region: Leningrad Oblast
- District: Kirishsky District
- Time zone: UTC+3:00

Avdetovo (Russian: Авдетово) is a rural locality (a village) in Budogoshchskoye Urban Settlement of Kirishsky District, Leningrad Oblast, Russia. The population was 6 as of 2010. There are 3 streets.

== Geography ==
Avdetovo is located 39 km southeast of Kirishi (the district's administrative centre) by road. Kukuy is the nearest rural locality.
