= Zaytsevo, Leningrad Oblast =

Village in Vyborgsky District, Russia

Coordinates: 61°03′40″N 29°26′30″E

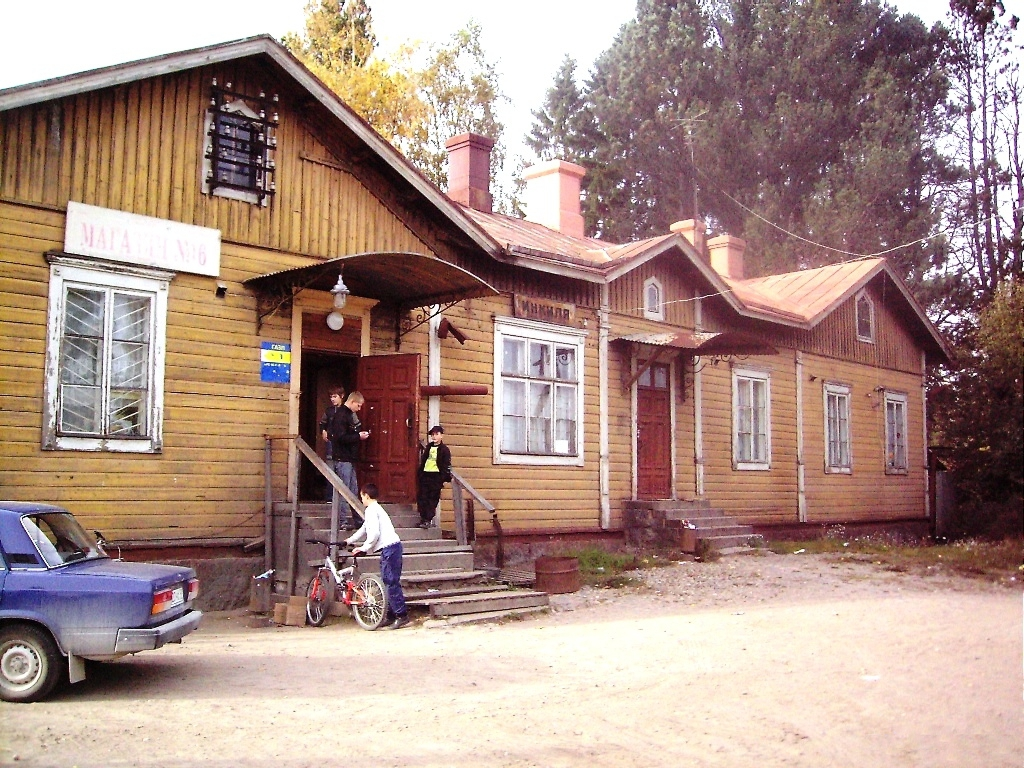
Shop in the former train station building

Zaytsevo (Russian: За́йцево) is a village in Vyborgsky District of Leningrad Oblast, Russia. Before the Continuation War, the village was called Inkilä (Finnish: Inkilä). The station of the Vyborg–Joensuu railroad situated in Zaytsevo is called Inkilya (Инкиля).
