= Telmana, Leningrad Oblast =

Rural locality in Tosnensky District, Russia

Coordinates: 59°43′20″N 30°36′48″E

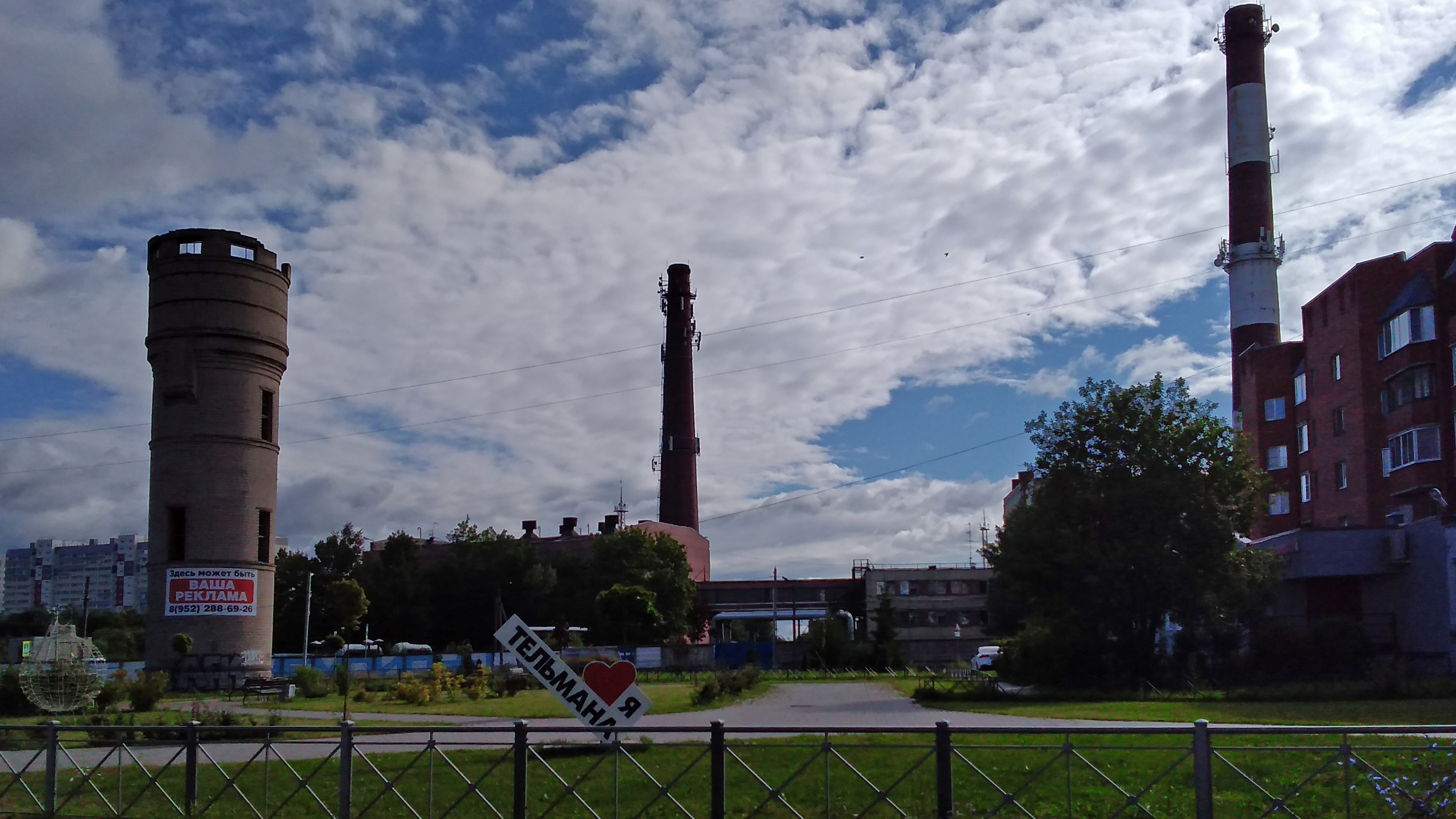
Telmana settlement entrance

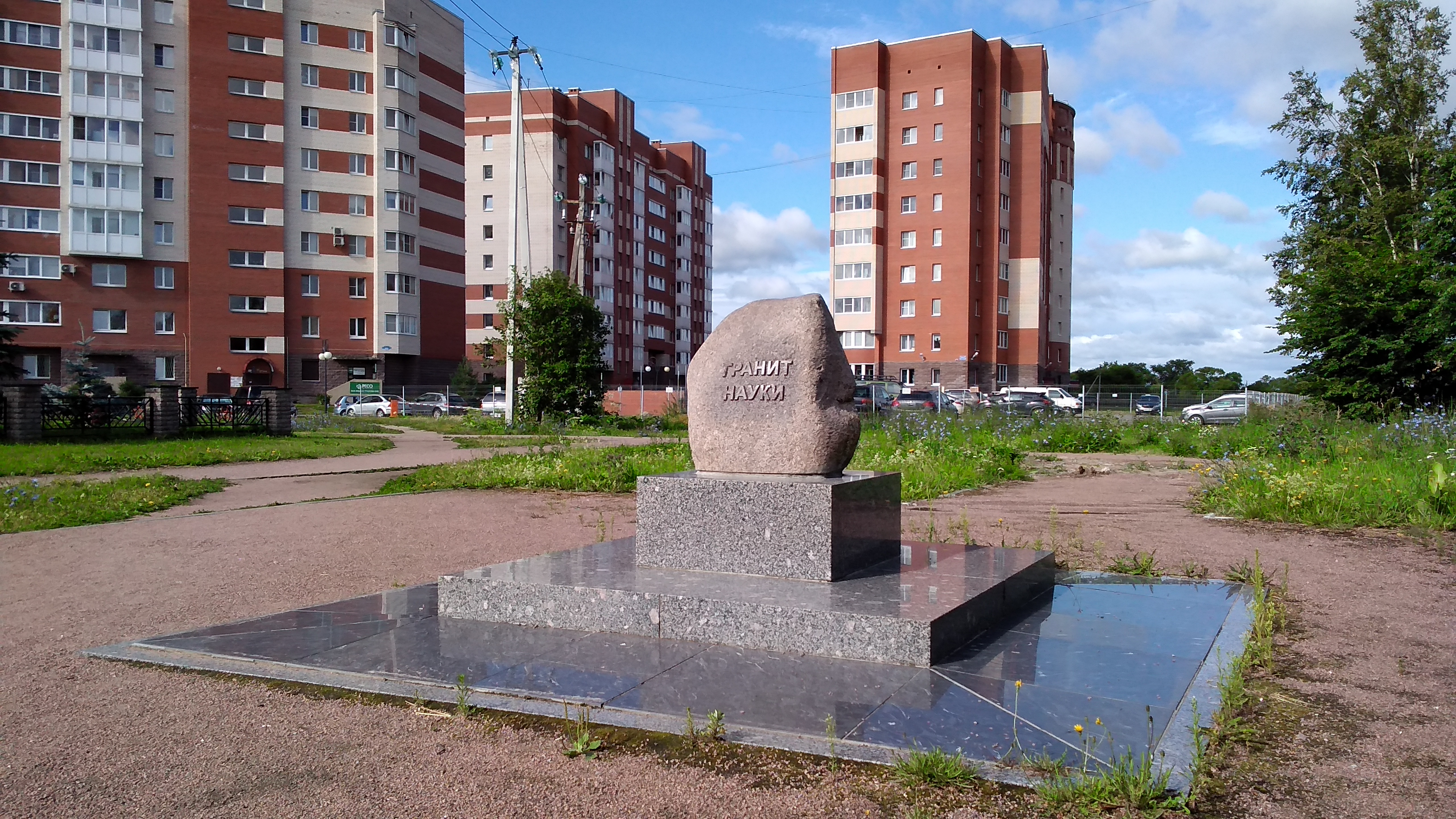
Granit Nauki monument at Telmana settlement

Telmana (Russian: Тельмана) is a rural locality (a logging depot settlement) in Tosnensky District of Leningrad Oblast, Russia, located almost adjacent to the municipal city of Kolpino on the territory of the federal city of St. Petersburg. Population: 8,757 (2010 census); 5,807 (2002 census).

With the expansion of Kolpino, Kolpino buildings are increasingly pushing into the borders of Telmana.
