= Seleznyovo =

Rural locality in Vyborgsky District, Russia

Coordinates: 60.7569°N 28.6222°E

- Vyborgsky District
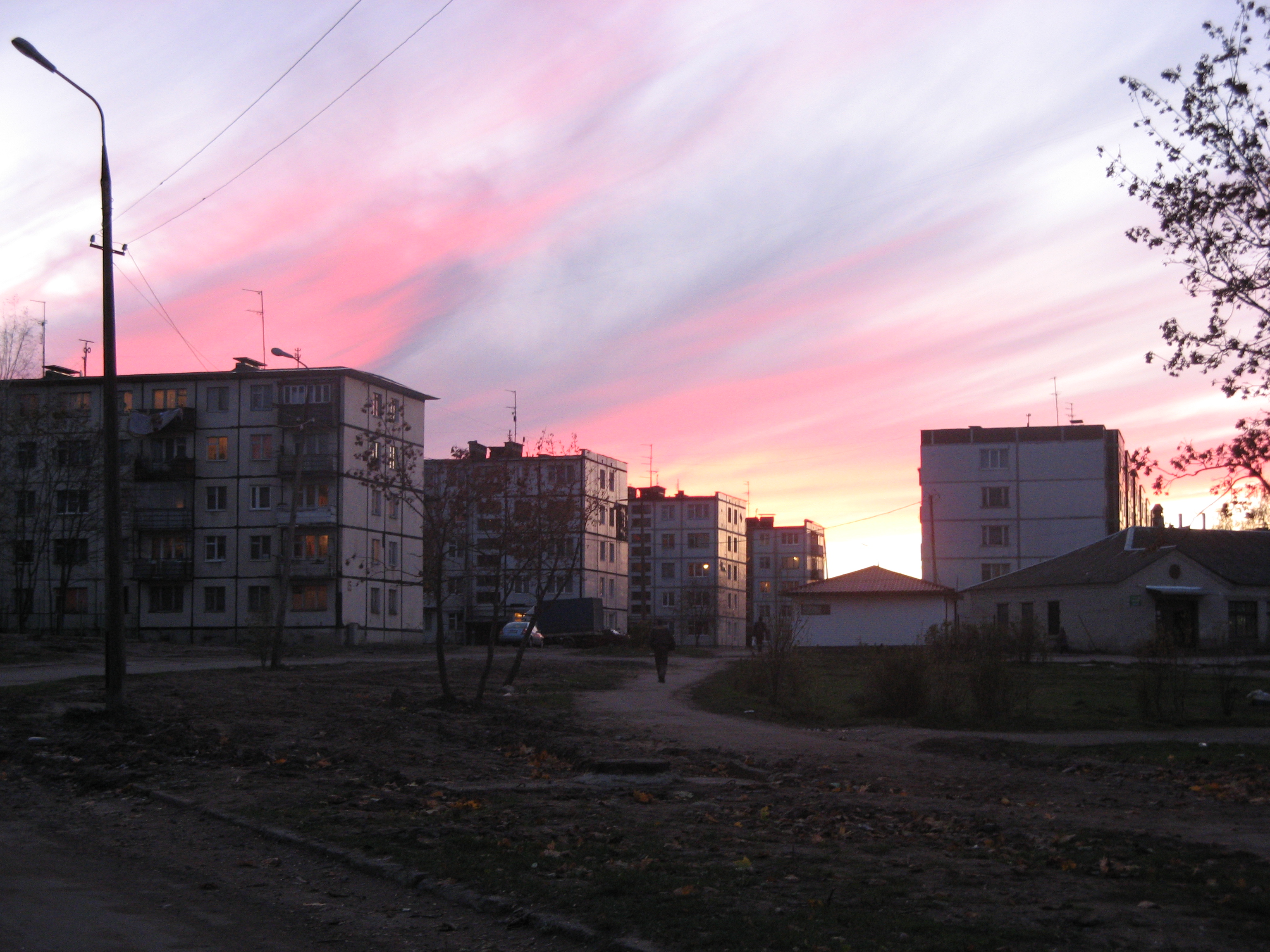
- Interactive map of Seleznyovo
- Country: Russia
- Federal subjects: Leningrad Oblast
- Administrative district: Vyborgsky District

Population (2006)
  - Total: 5 935
- Time zone: UTC+3 (EEST)

Seleznyovo (Russian: Селезнёво; Finnish: Ykspää) is a settlement near Vyborg, in Vyborgsky District of Leningrad Oblast.

== History ==
Part of Ykspää was merged from the Vyborg municipality into the city of Vyborg, along with suburbs of the city, in 1933. In the same year the city of Vyborg submitted an initiative to the Finnish Government to merge further areas from the municipality, including the majority of the village of Ykspää. The municipality opposed the initiative and submitted its own one, proposing that the previously merged areas from Ykspää, Naulasaari, and Haavankylä should be remerged back to the municipality. In 1938 the Finnish Government decided that 27 estates would be remerged to the municipality.

=== Pre-war conditions ===
During the 1930s the Finnish national road 13 and Riihimäki-Saint Petersburg railroad with the Ykspää station ran through Ykspää. In 1937 Ykspää included 379 ha of forests, 301 ha of fields and 3 ha of meadows.

The biggest industrial facility in the village was the wood wool plant of Ykspään Lastu Oy, founded in 1938. Before it the groundwood mill of Ykspään Kartano Oy was located in Ykspää. There was a store owned by M. Nieminen in the village.

The majority of the town belonged to the Merijoki school district, with the school located in the village of Suur-Merijoki. The rest belonged to Kaukola school district, with the school located in the village of Kaukola.

In the 1930 census Ykspää had 2,148 residents, with 2,095 native Finnish speakers, 14 Swedish speakers, and 39 speakers of other languages. In 1937 the village had 174 residents.
