= Avati, Leningrad Oblast =

Avati Авати
- Village
- Location within Leningrad Oblast Location within Russia
- Coordinates: 59°24′N 30°48′E
- Country: Russia
- Region: Leningrad Oblast
- District: Tosnensky District
- Time zone: UTC+3:00

Avati (Russian: Авати) is a rural locality (a village) in Tosnensnoye Urban Settlement of Tosnensky District, Leningrad Oblast, Russia. The population was 10 as of 2017.

== Geography ==
Avati is located 24 km south of Tosno (the district's administrative centre) by road. Gorka is the nearest rural locality.
