= Staroselye, Vyborgsky District, Leningrad Oblast =

Rural locality in Vyborgsky District, Russia

Coordinates: 60°30′15″N 29°23′09″E

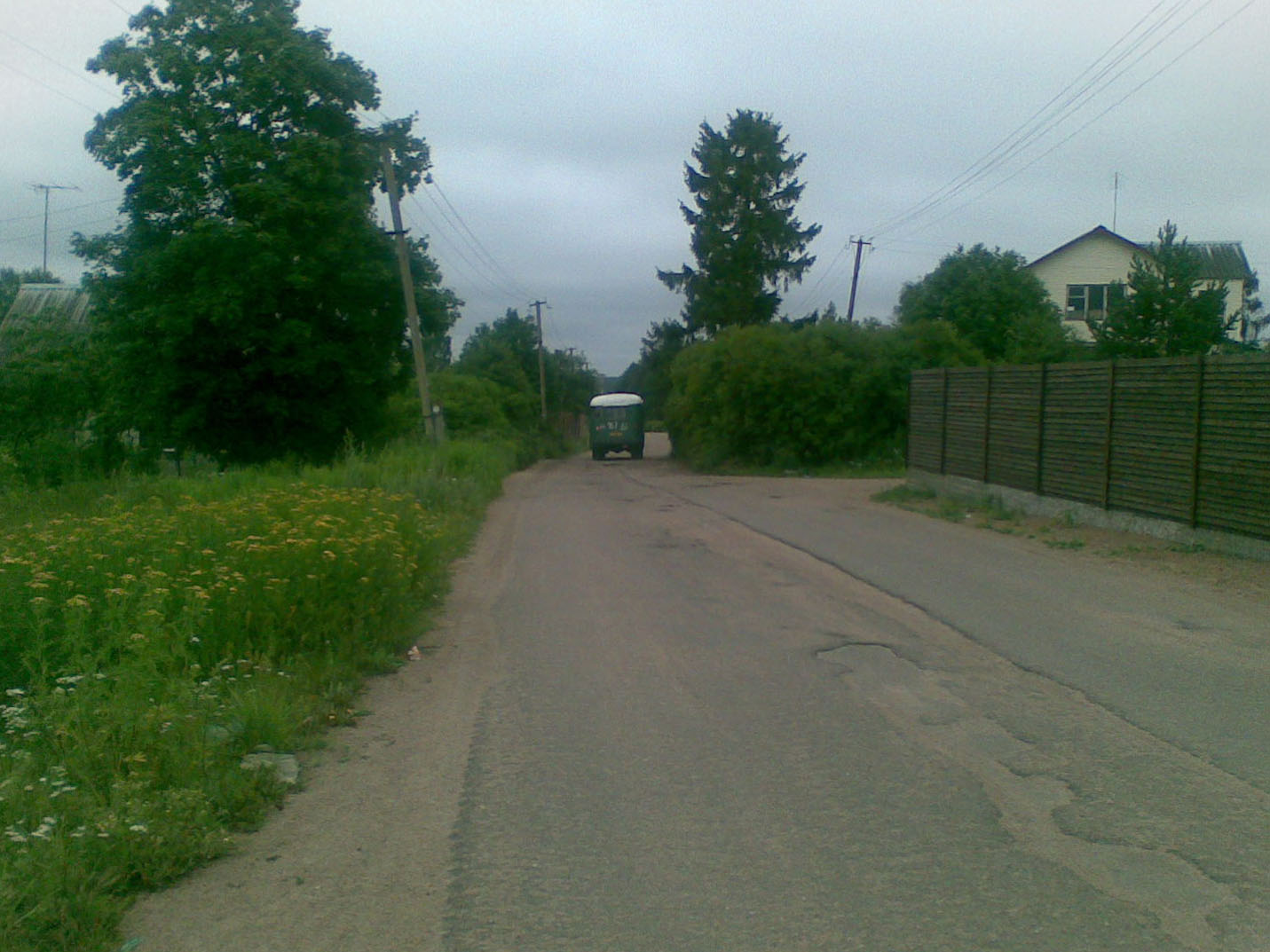
The main road of Staroselye in 2007

Staroselye (Russian: Старосе́лье; Finnish: Keskikylä) is a rural locality (a village) in Vyborgsky District of Leningrad Oblast, Russia, located on the Karelian Isthmus at the head of Zagorsky Gulf, Lake Glubokoye.

== History ==
Before 1939, it was a part of Viipuri Province, Finland and was known as Keskikylä. It also consisted of four lesser settlements: Jääskelä, Norkkola, Orola, and Pyykkölä. In 1948, Jääskelä was renamed Voskhod (Восход) after a kolkhoz of the same name had been established in the village. Soon after it was renamed again, this time Staroselye. The new name was soon spread on the whole Keskikylä. On January 13, 1949, it was confirmed by the Presidium of Supreme Soviet of Russia.
