= Krasnogvardeysky, Vladimir Oblast =

Krasnogvardeysky Красногвардейский
- Settlement
- Location within Vladimir Oblast Location within Russia
- Coordinates: 56°30′N 40°32′E
- Country: Russia
- Region: Vladimir Oblast
- District: Suzdalsky District
- Time zone: UTC+3:00

Krasnogvardeysky (Russian: Красногвардейский) is a rural locality (a settlement) in Seletskoye Rural Settlement, Suzdalsky District, Vladimir Oblast, Russia. The population was 985 as of 2010. There are 9 streets.

== Geography ==
Krasnogvardeysky is located 13 km northeast of Suzdal (the district's administrative centre) by road. Lopatnitsy is the nearest rural locality.
