= Mginskoye Urban Settlement =

Mginskoye Urban Settlement Мгинское городское поселение
- Urban settlement
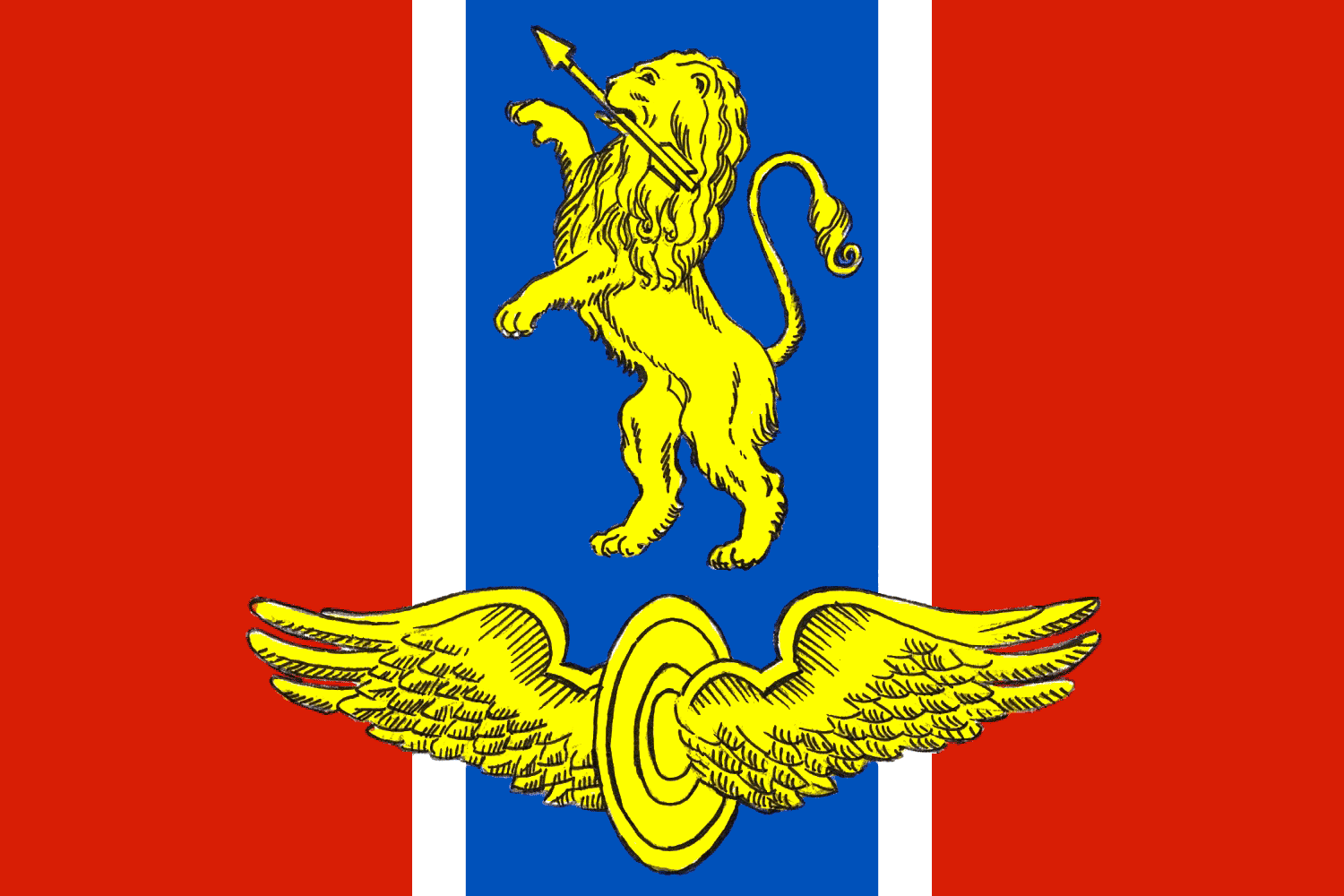
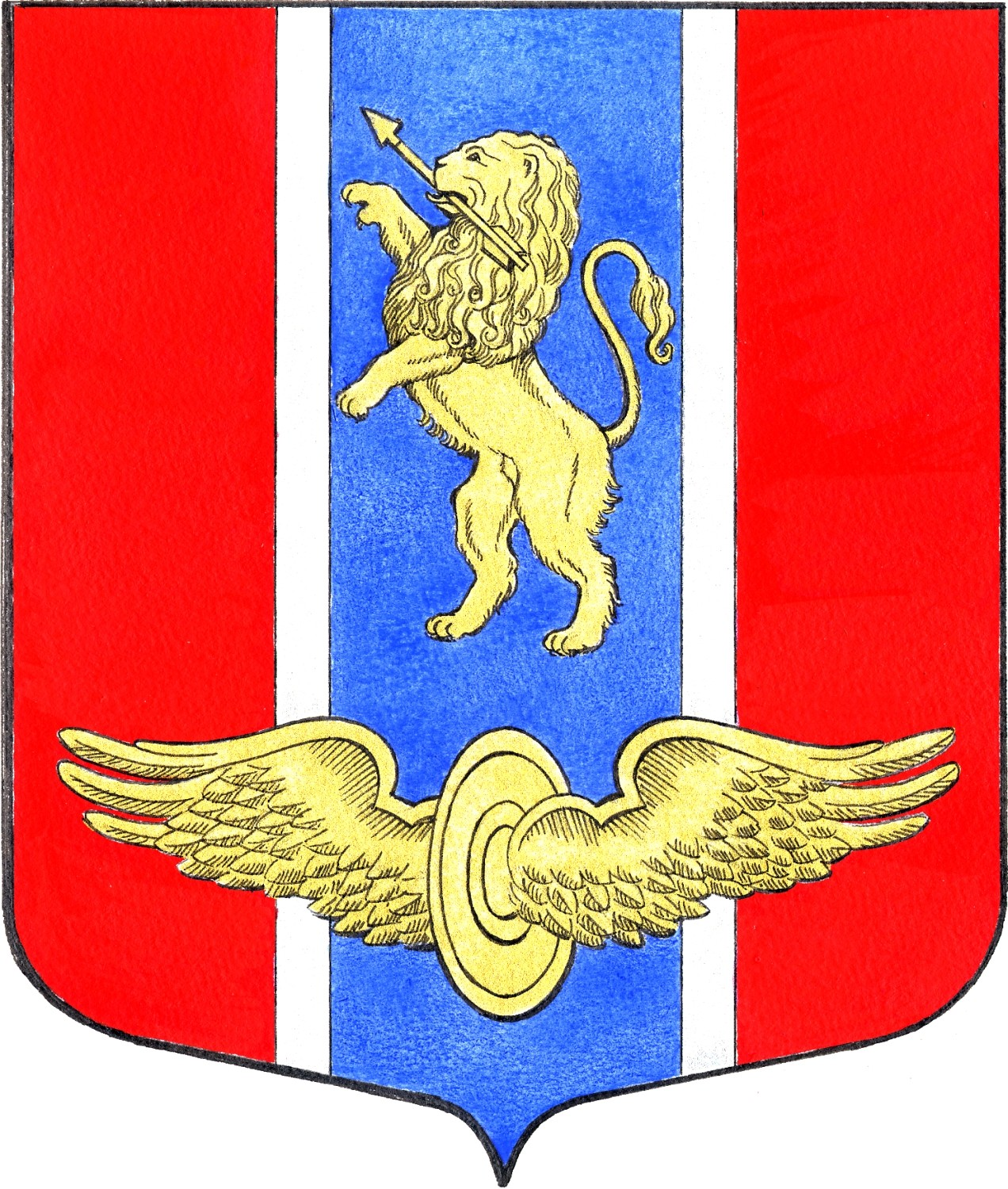
- Flag Coat of arms
- Interactive map of Mginskoye Urban Settlement
- Location of Mginskoye Urban Settlement Mginskoye Urban Settlement (Leningrad Oblast)
- Coordinates: 59°45′N 31°04′E
- Country: Russia
- Federal subject: Leningrad Oblast
- Administrative district: Kirovsky District
- Established: 1 January 2006

Population (2010 Census)
  - Total: 12,353
  - Estimate (2024): 13,143 (+6.4%)
- Time zone: UTC+3 (MSK)
- OKTMO ID: 41625154
- Website: mga.lenobl.ru/mo

Mginskoye Urban Settlement (Russian: Мгинское городское поселение) is an urban settlement (городское поселение) in the Kirovsky District of Leningrad Oblast, Russia. Population: 12,353 (2010 census); It consists of the urban settlement Mga and 18 villages.
