= Krasnogvardeysky District, Stavropol Krai =

Krasnogvardeysky District Красногвардейский район (Russian)
- District
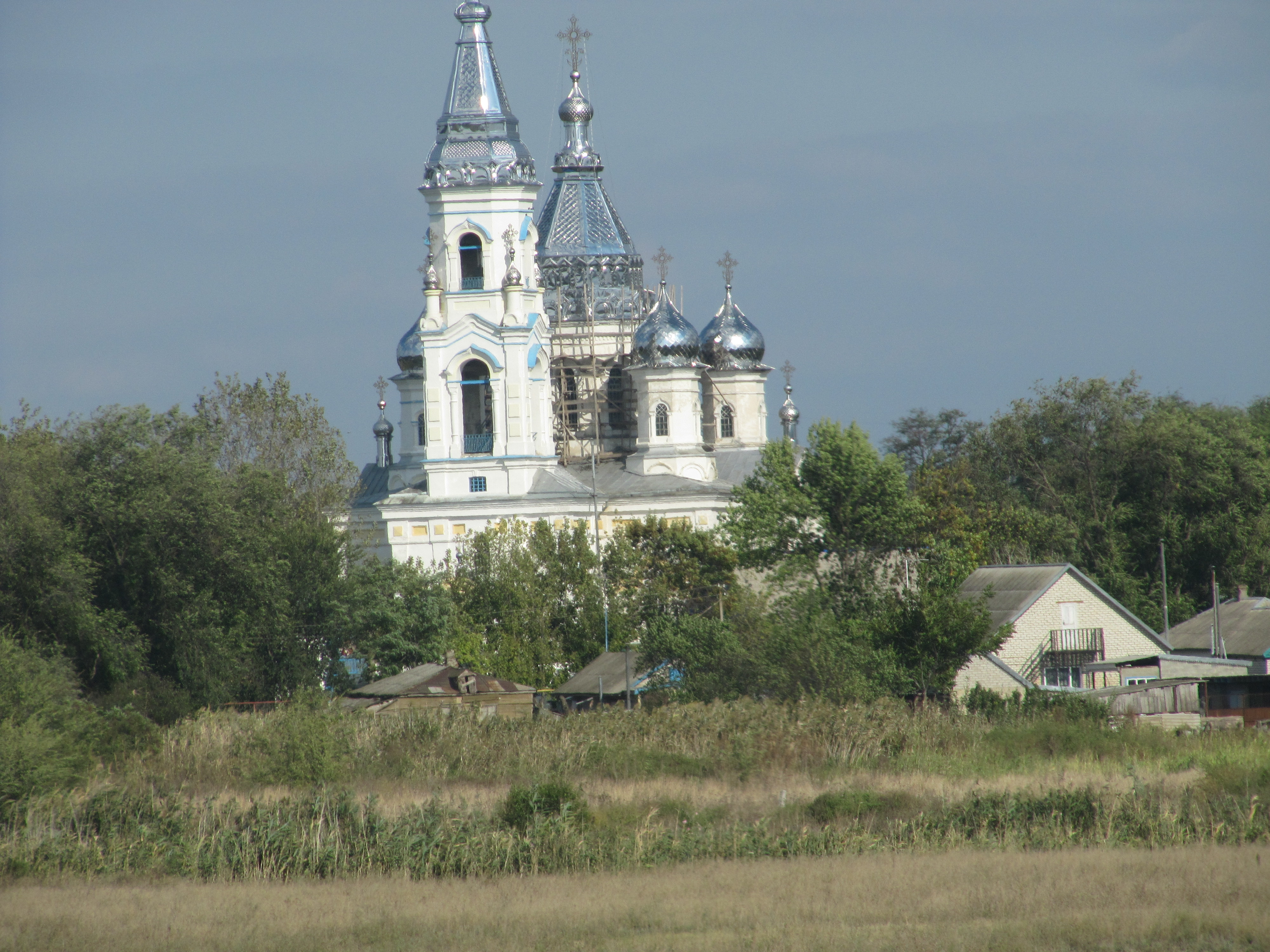
- Church in village Dmitrievsky, Krasnogvardeysky District

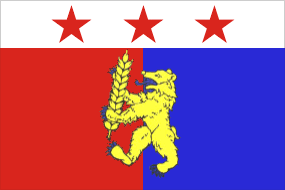
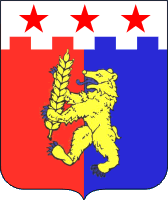
- Flag Coat of arms
- Location of Krasnogvardeysky District in Stavropol Krai
- Coordinates: 45°51′N 41°31′E
- Country: Russia
- Federal subject: Stavropol Krai
- Established: 1957
- Administrative center: Krasnogvardeyskoye

Area
  - Total: 2,236 km^{2} (863 sq mi)

Population (2010 Census)
  - Total: 40,957
  - Density: 18.32/km^{2} (47.44/sq mi)
  - Urban: 0%
  - Rural: 100%

Administrative structure
  - Administrative divisions: 5 Selsoviets
  - Inhabited localities: 19 rural localities

Municipal structure
  - Municipally incorporated as: Krasnogvardeysky Municipal District
  - Municipal divisions: 0 urban settlements, 11 rural settlements
- Time zone: UTC+3 (MSK)
- OKTMO ID: 07630000
- Website: http://www.krasnogvardeiskoe.info

Krasnogvardeysky District (Russian: Красногварде́йский райо́н) is an administrative district (raion), one of the twenty-six in Stavropol Krai, Russia. Municipally, it is incorporated as Krasnogvardeysky Municipal District. It is located in the northwest of the krai. The area of the district is 2,236 square kilometers (863 sq mi). Its administrative center is the rural locality (a selo) of Krasnogvardeyskoye. Population: 40,957 (2010 census); 42,008 (2002 Census); 39,855 (1989 Census). The population of Krasnogvardeyskoye accounts for 39.1% of the district's total population.
