= Yarkoye, Priozersky District =

Yarkoye Яркое
- Village
- Location within Leningrad Oblast Location within Russia
- Coordinates: 61°01′36″N 30°0′0″E
- Country: Russia
- Region: Leningrad Oblast
- District: Priozersky District
- Time zone: UTC+3:00

Yarkoye (Russian: Яркое) is a settlement in the Priozersky District, Leningrad Oblast, Russia by the Vuoksa Lake.

== History ==
Until 1939 the territory of the modern settlement included two villages: Suotniemi and Koivula in the Käkisalmi Rural Municipality (Käkisalmi Maalaiskunta) of Finland. After the Winter War the area was ceded to the Karelo-Finnish Soviet Socialist Republic of the Soviet Union.

In 1842 a porcelain and faience factory was opened in Suotniemi by Christian Wilhelm Löfström (1792-1870), not survived.

There are two tourist bases named "Yarkoye" within this territory. One of them operates since 1947, former name Приозерская туристская база.

The development of a new summer cottage block named "Suotniemi" started in the territory.
