= Sosnovskoye Rural Settlement, Leningrad Oblast =

Human settlement in Priozersky District, Leningrad Oblast, Russia

Coordinates: 60°34′N 30°15′E

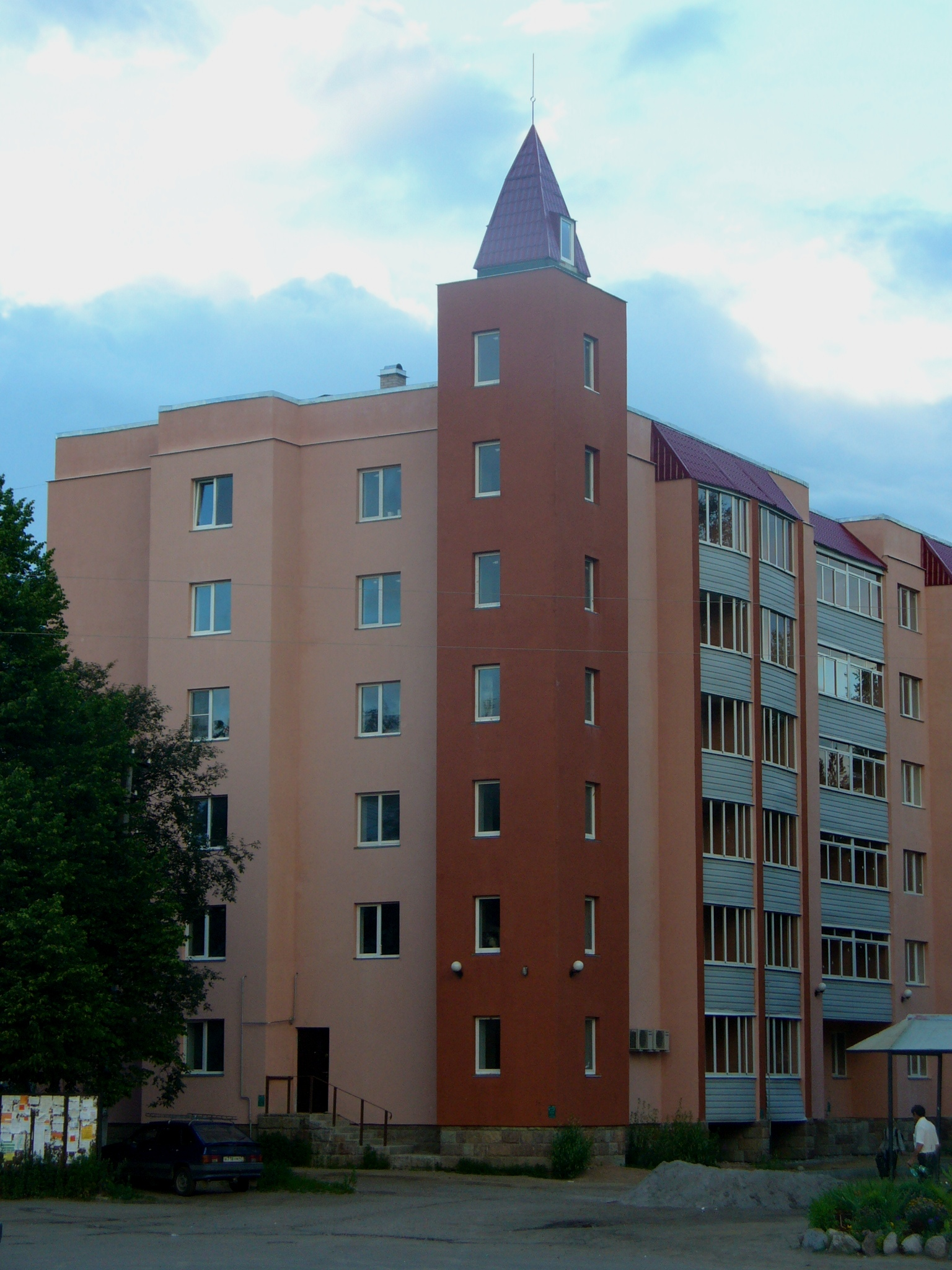
Block of flats in Sosnovo, Priozersk rayon, Leningrad oblast, Russia

Sosnovskoye Rural Settlement (Russian: Сосновское сельское поселение) is an administrative and municipal division (a rural settlement) of Priozersky District of Leningrad Oblast, Russia. Its administrative center is the rural locality (a selo) of Sosnovo. Population: 10,830 (2010 Census);
