= Valuyki, Belgorod Oblast =

Town in Belgorod Oblast, Russia

Valuyki Валуйки
- Town
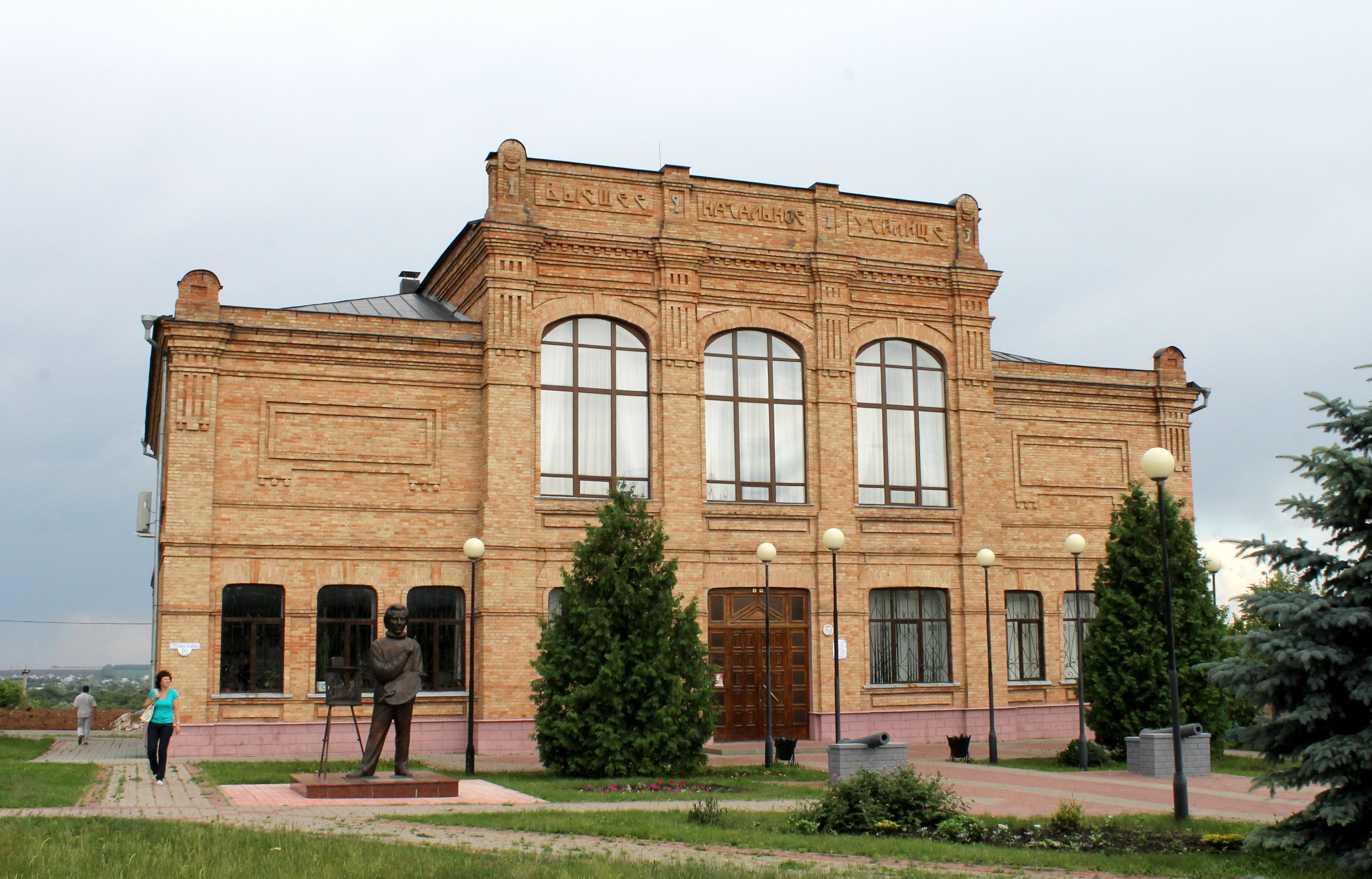
- Museum of history and arts

- Flag Coat of arms
- Interactive map of Valuyki
- Location of Valuyki Valuyki (Belgorod Oblast)
- Coordinates: 50°13′N 38°06′E
- Country: Russia
- Federal subject: Belgorod Oblast
- Founded: 1593
- Elevation: 90 m (300 ft)

Population (2010 Census)
  - Total: 35,322
  - Estimate (2021): 33,032 (−6.5%)

Administrative status
  - Subordinated to: town of oblast significance of Valuyki
  - Capital of: town of oblast significance of Valuyki, Valuysky District

Municipal status
  - Municipal district: Valuysky Municipal District
  - Urban settlement: Valuyki Urban Settlement
  - Capital of: Valuysky Municipal District, Valuyki Urban Settlement
- Time zone: UTC+3 (MSK)
- Postal code: 143615
- OKTMO ID: 14620101001

Valuyki (Russian: Валу́йки) is a town in Belgorod Oblast, Russia, located at the confluence of the Valuy and Oskol Rivers, 150 kilometers (93 mi) east of Belgorod and 15 km north of the Russia–Ukraine border. Population: 33,032 (2021 census); 35,322 (2010 census); 35,790 (2002 census); 34,863 (1989 Soviet census).

== History ==
Historical affiliations

Tsardom of Russia 1593–1721
Russian Empire 1721–1917
Russian Republic 1917
Soviet Russia 1918–1922
Soviet Union 1922–1991
Russian Federation 1991–present

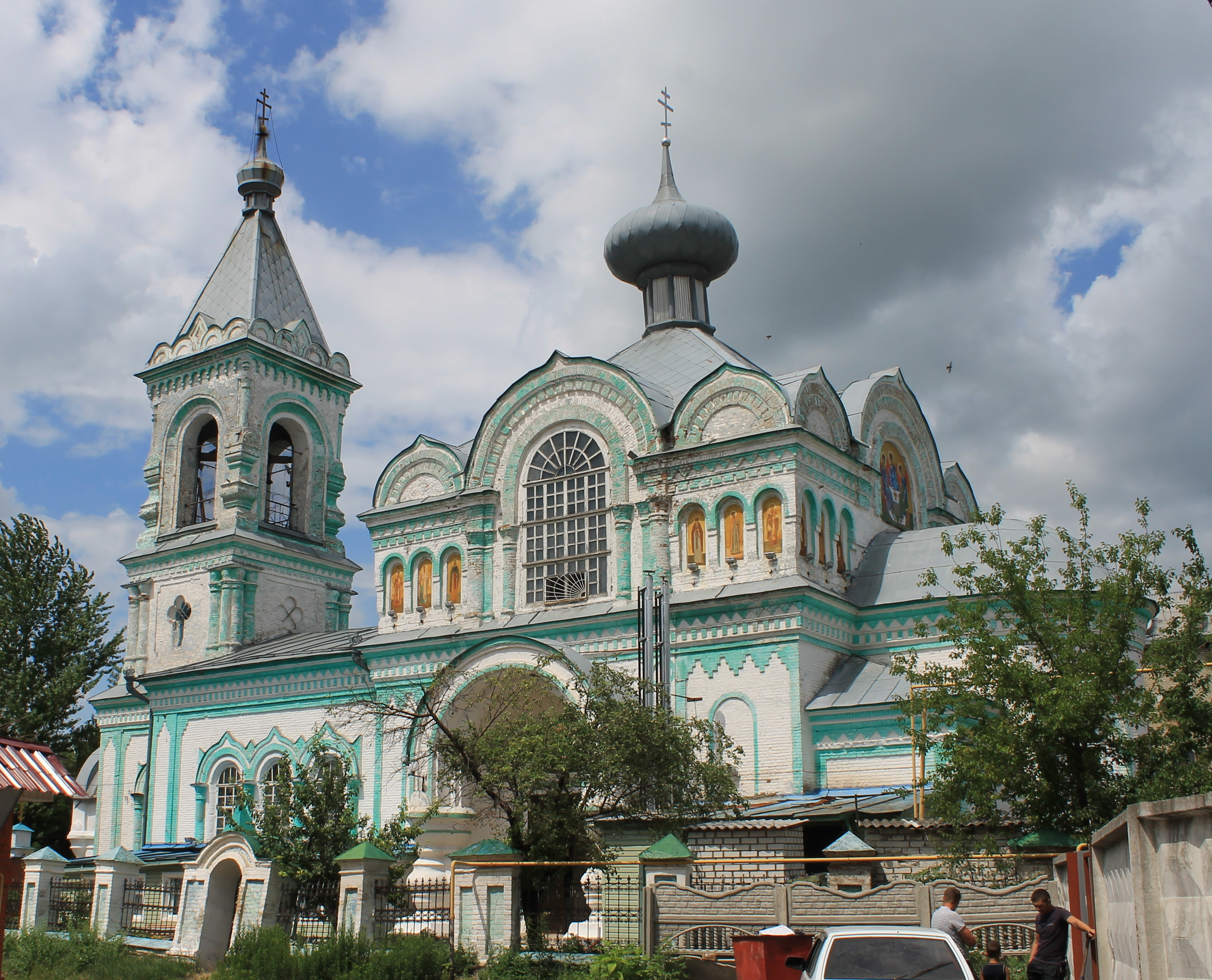
St. Nicholas's Church

Valuyki was founded in 1593 as a fortress for protection against the Crimean and Nogai Tatar raids along the Muravsky Trail.

In January 1943, during ARMIR's retreat from the Don front, after days of continuous fighting, exhausted by cold and hunger, numerous men from various units of the 4th Alpine Division "Cuneense", commanded by General Emilio Battisti, converged in Valuyki. Despite their attempt to break out of encirclement and open a way to the west, the Alpini were surrounded and blocked by Soviet troops and finally forced to surrender.

In early September 2015 Reuters reported that Russia was building a new army base "near Valuyki, a small town not far from Soloti." Established in connection with the war in Ukraine, the base was to have barracks for 3,500 soldiers. During the Russian invasion of Ukraine there were reports that Ukrainian artillery shelled the base of the Russian 3rd Motor Rifle Division in September 2022.

== Politics ==
On 18 January 2012, the municipal council of the city of Valuyki and the Valuysky district appointed by a majority vote Alexei Dybov, who previously headed the Krasnensky District, to the position of its head. At the meeting, deputies considered two candidates who passed the competitive selection. Before Alexey Dybov, this position was held by Ivan Posokhov, who won the election as head of local government in 2003 and was then re-elected by the municipal council in 2008 until he resigned in December 2011.

=== Municipal council and local elections ===
City Assembly of the 3rd convocation after the elections on 8 September 2013 United Russia: 16 deputies CPRF: 1 deputy A Just Russia: 1 deputy

On 13 October 2003, early elections were held for the head of local government in the city of Valuyki and the Valuysky District. Voter turnout was 44.4%. Per the voting results, Ivan Posokhov received 11,028 votes (45.05%), winning against his opponents, Yuri Arkatov, who received 38.9%, and Nikolai Sobolev, who received 3.52%. In the same election, 2,070 voters (or 8.4%) chose to vote "against all options," and 979 ballots were declared invalid.

On 27 July 2007, the city meeting adopted a charter regulating the work of the municipal council of the city of Valuyki and the Valuysky district. The council, consisting of 32 people, was given the authority to approve the municipal budget and introduce local taxes and fees. The key feature of the council was the procedure for its formation: the heads of the settlements that are part of the municipality and deputies of elected bodies (one deputy from each settlement) became members of the council. In 2008, the municipal council re-elected Ivan Posokhov to the position of head of the city and district without elections similar to those held in 2003.

Until 2018, Valuyki had its own city assembly, which was elected three times and consisted of 20 deputies. In the elections of the third convocation of the city assembly, held on 8 September 2013, the voter turnout was 64.2%. Voting was carried out in 5 electoral districts. Two of them were five-mandate, two more were four-mandate. One of the constituencies had two mandates. According to the election results, 18 of the 20 seats in the city assembly were occupied by United Russia deputies, while two of them resigned; therefore, by-elections were required. One seat each went to deputies from the Communist Party of the Russian Federation and A Just Russia.

=== Creation of Valuysky urban district ===
Council of Deputies of the Valuysky Urban District of the 1st convocation United Russia: 20 deputies CPRF: 3 deputies LDPR: 1 deputy A Just Russia: 1 deputy

On 19 April 2018, the city of Valuyki and all settlements that were part of the Valuysky District were united into the Valuysky urban district. As part of the structure of the administration of the urban district, 18 territorial administrations were formed in rural areas, to which 93 rural settlements are subordinate, while 3 rural settlements are directly subordinate to the city of Valuyki (the villages of Agoshevka and Novaya Simonovka, as well as the Kuznetsovka farm).

The newly formed Council of Deputies includes 25 persons, with 12 of them elected in twelve single-mandate constituencies, while 13 are elected in a single electoral district. Among other things, the Council approves the local budget, manages state property, can establish and cancel local taxes and fees, assigns names to streets, and maintains the road network in the territory allocated to it. It also has the right to create museums, higher educational institutions and create the necessary conditions for the national and cultural autonomies of the district.

Map of single-mandate electoral districts as of 2018

It is assumed that residents of the Valuysky urban district can initiate a local referendum, while the decisions of such a referendum are binding and do not require approval by any government bodies; resolutions and orders of the administration must also not contradict the decisions of the local referendum. In addition, residents of the district can come up with a law-making initiative, i.e., propose to the Council of Deputies to adopt a new legal act. Citizens have the right to influence deputies through public hearings. Such hearings are mandatory if deputies intend to make changes to the Charter of the Valuysky Urban District. Also, a draft budget and a report on its implementation must be submitted to the hearing. Finally, residents can cooperate and create territorial public self-governments, using them to satisfy social and everyday needs and protect their interests.

On 8 September 2019, on single voting day, elections of deputies to the Council of Deputies of the Valuysky City District of the first convocation were held. Representatives of the United Russia party won in all twelve single-mandate constituencies. In the single electoral district, representatives of United Russia received 59.4% (15,321 votes); the Communist Party of the Russian Federation - 22.8% (5,877 votes); the Liberal Democratic Party of Russia - 8.9% (2,318 votes); A Just Russia - 5.7% (1486 votes). Thus, according to the voting results, members of the United Russia party received a total of 20 seats. The second largest party was the CPRF, which took 3 of the 25 seats in the council.

=== Regional elections ===
During the elections of deputies to the Belgorod Oblast Duma of the 6th convocation on 13 September 2015, significant violations of election legislation were registered at one of the polling stations. On election day, from 12:00 to 15:00, voter turnout increased sharply from 17.1% to 66.6%. A member of the election commission and an observer voiced doubts about this increase, but their complaints were ignored. Only after the Communist Party of the Russian Federation applied to the election commission of the Belgorod Oblast, the votes were recounted. During the recount, the number of votes received by United Russia decreased by 486. The regional election commission separately noted "serious shortcomings in the work of the election commission of the municipal district "City of Valuyki and Valuysky District" when considering appeals, and the inaction of the commission's leaders." The leaders and members of the precinct election commission were removed from their duties. Its chairman was brought to administrative responsibility.

=== Federal elections ===
In the elections to the 6th State Duma, held on 4 December 2011 in Valuyki and Valuysky district, the United Russia party received 49.4% of the votes; the Communist Party of the Russian Federation - 23.4%; the LDPR - 11.9%; A Just Russia - 10.6%; and Yabloko - 1.2%. The most insignificant results were shown by the parties Patriots of Russia (0.9%) and Right Cause (0.4%). During the elections, members of the precinct election commission registered violations at one of the polling stations, as reported by the press service of the regional branch of the Communist Party of the Russian Federation. The reduced percentage of votes received by United Russia was associated with the resignation of the district head, Ivan Posokhov.

On 18 September 2016, elections to the 7th State Duma were held in Valuyki and Valuysky district. Member of the United Russia faction Andrei Skoch won in the single-mandate constituency with 27,509 votes. The votes in the federal electoral district were distributed as follows:

Results of voting in the federal electoral district in the elections of deputies of the State Duma of the VII convocation
Party	Rodina	Communists of Russia	Russian Party of Pensioners for Social Justice	United Russia	Russian Ecological Party "The Greens"	Civic Platform	Liberal Democratic Party of Russia	People's Freedom Party	Party of Growth	Civilian Power	Yabloko	Communist Party of the Russian Federation	Patriots of Russia	A Just Russia
Votes	313 (0.8%)	721 (1.9%)	599 (1.6%)	21 507 (58.1%)	177 (0.4%)	57 (0.1%)	5 885 (15.9%)	112 (0.3%)	152 (0.4%)	37 (0.1%)	162 (0.4%)	5 585 (15.1%)	117 (0.3%)	817 (2.2%)
Source: Valuyki Election Commission, Central Election Commission of the Russian Federation.

== Administrative and municipal status ==
Within the framework of administrative divisions, Valuyki serves as the administrative center of Valuysky District, even though it is not a part of it. As an administrative division, it is incorporated separately as the town of oblast significance of Valuyki—an administrative unit with the status equal to that of the districts. As a municipal division, the town of oblast significance of Valuyki, together with three rural localities in Yablonovsky Rural Okrug of Valuysky District, is incorporated within Valuysky Municipal District as Valuyki Urban Settlement.

== Notable people ==
- Aleksandr Kokorin (1991) – Russian professional football player
