= Valuysky District =

Valuysky District Валуйский район (Russian)
- District
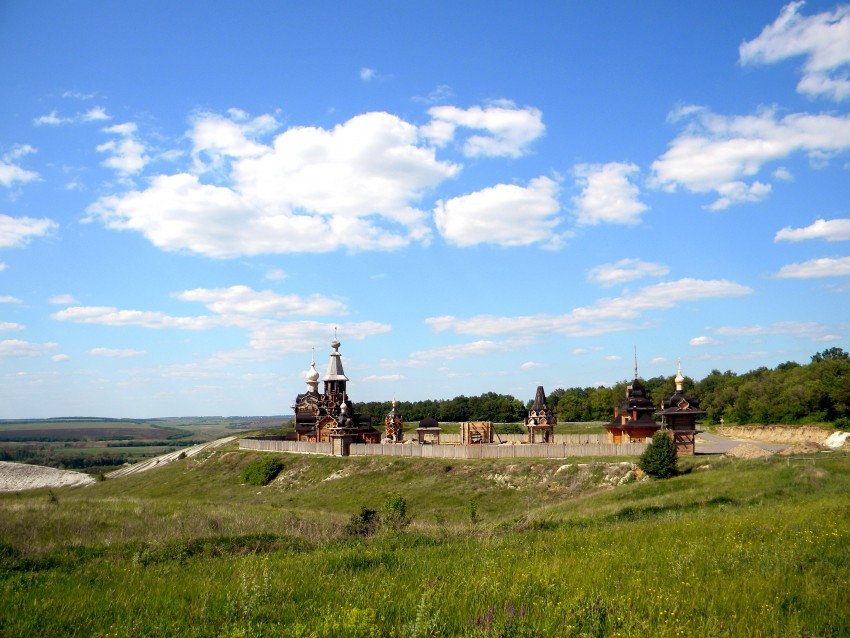
- New Jerusalem Monastery, Valuiki

- Flag Coat of arms
- Location of Valuysky District in Belgorod Oblast
- Coordinates: 50°11′N 38°07′E
- Country: Russia
- Federal subject: Belgorod Oblast
- Established: 1928
- Administrative center: Valuyki

Area
  - Total: 1,709.6 km^{2} (660.1 sq mi)

Population (2010 Census)
  - Total: 33,845
  - Density: 19.797/km^{2} (51.274/sq mi)
  - Urban: 20.6%
  - Rural: 79.4%

Administrative structure
  - Inhabited localities: 1 urban-type settlements, 95 rural localities

Municipal structure
  - Municipally incorporated as: Valuysky Municipal District
  - Municipal divisions: 2 urban settlements, 14 rural settlements
- Time zone: UTC+3 (MSK)
- OKTMO ID: 14720000
- Website: http://val-adm.ru/

Valuysky District (Russian: Валу́йский райо́н) is an administrative district (raion), one of the twenty-one in Belgorod Oblast, Russia. As a municipal division, it is incorporated as Valuysky Municipal District. It is located in the south of the oblast. The area of the district is 1,709.6 square kilometers (660.1 sq mi). Its administrative center is the town of Valuyki (which is not administratively a part of the district). Population: 33,845 (2010 census); 36,601 (2002 Census); 38,293 (1989 Soviet census).

== Administrative and municipal status ==
Within the framework of administrative divisions, Valuysky District is one of the twenty-one in the oblast. The town of Valuyki serves as its administrative center, despite being incorporated separately as a town of oblast significance—an administrative unit with the status equal to that of the districts.

As a municipal division, the district is incorporated as Valuysky Municipal District, with the town of oblast significance of Valuyki being incorporated within it as Valuyki Urban Settlement.
