= February 1918 =

Month in 1918

<<	February 1918					>>
Su	Mo	Tu	We	Th	Fr	Sa
					1	2
3	4	5	6	7	8	9
10	11	12	13	14	15	16
17	18	19	20	21	22	23
24	25	26	27	28

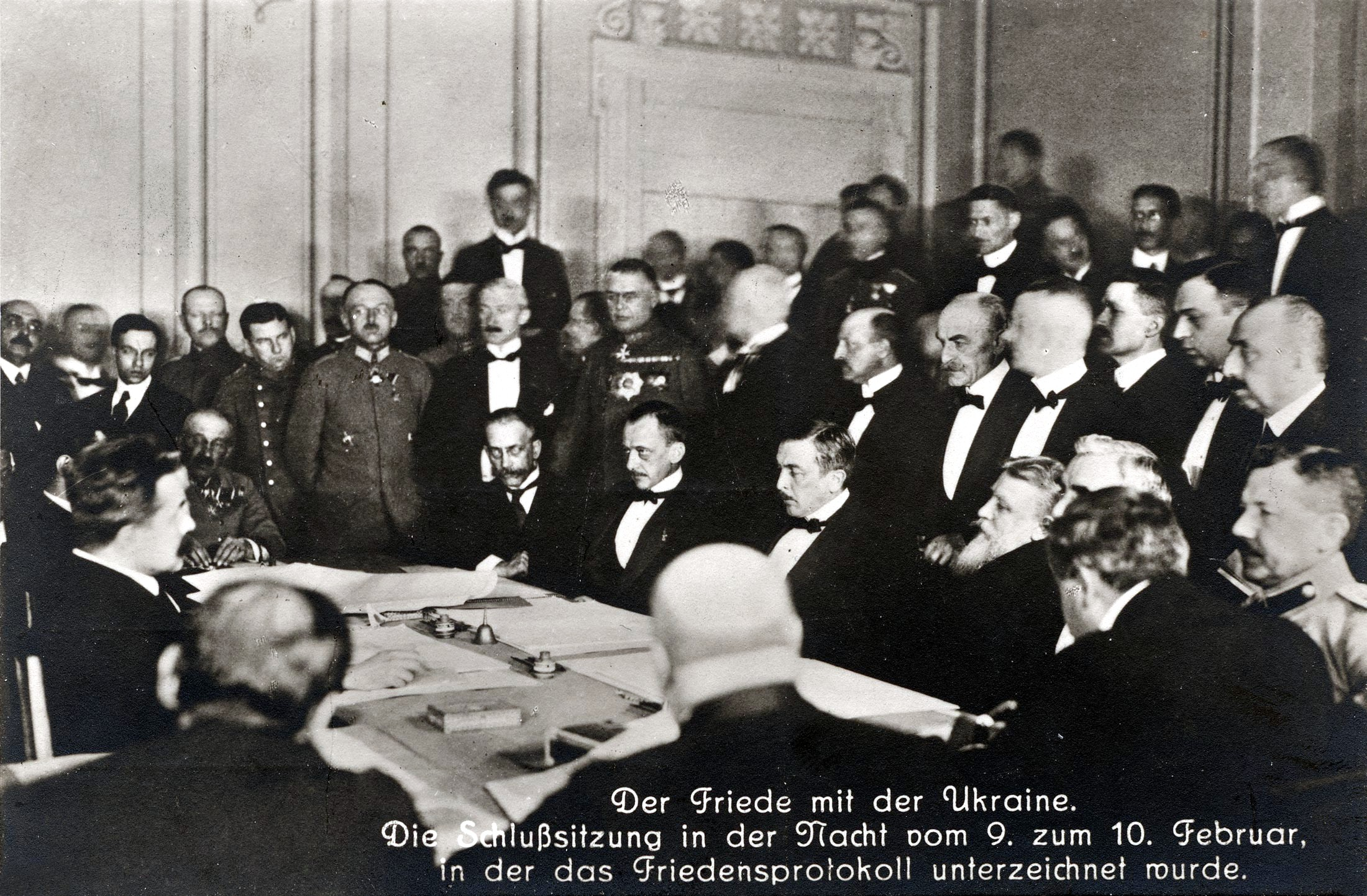
Signing of the Peace Treaty of Brest-Litovsk, ending the fighting between Ukraine and the Central Powers.

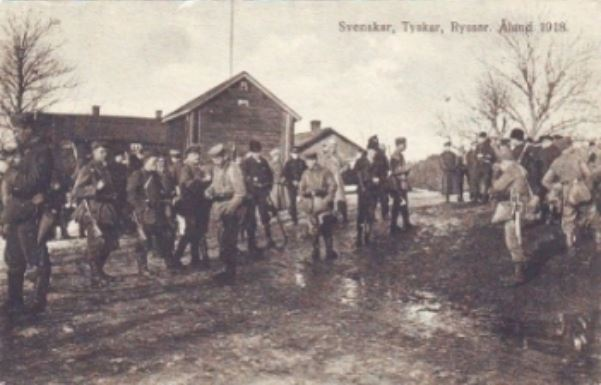
Swedish, German and Soviet soldiers together during a lull in the Invasion of Åland off Finland.

The following events occurred in February 1918:

== February 1, 1918 (Friday) ==
- Sailors of the Austro-Hungarian Navy Fifth Fleet mutinied in the Gulf of Cattaro of the Adriatic Sea near Montenegro.
- Soviet–Ukrainian War – The Central Council of Ukraine called for an end to an armed workers uprising at an arsenal factory in Kiev with a promise to negotiate immediate socioeconomic reforms.
- Royal Navy submarine HMS E50 struck a mine and sank in the North Sea with all 31 crew lost.
- The Imperial German Army established the 17th Army to serve on the Western Front.
- The Royal Flying Corps established air squadrons No. 123, No. 124, No. 125, No. 126, and No. 128.
- The Luftstreitkräfte, the air arm of the Imperial German Army, established air squadrons Jagdstaffel 68 and 69.
- Movie western star William S. Hart was both director and star of 'Blue Blazes' Rawden, released through Paramount Pictures. The film has been preserved and is available in several formats.
- The musical Oh, Lady! Lady!!, written by Guy Bolton and P. G. Wodehouse with music by Jerome Kern, was released on Broadway at the Princess Theatre in New York City where it ran for 219 performances.
- The U-boat War Badge was established to award German submarine crews that completed more than three patrols during wartime.
- The football Club Sportivo was established in Buenos Aires.
- Born:
  - Carlos Fayt, Argentine politician, Minister of the Supreme Court of Argentina from 1983 to 2015; in Salta, Argentina (d. 2016)
  - Muriel Spark, Scottish writer, author of The Prime of Miss Jean Brodie; as Muriel Sarah Camberg, in Edinburgh, Scotland (d. 2006)
- Died:
  - William Melville, 67, British law enforcer and intelligence officer, first chief of the British Secret Bureau (b. 1850)
  - Leonilla Bariatinskaya, 101, Russian noble, wife to Ludwig zu Sayn-Wittgenstein-Berleburg, subject of various portraits by German artist Franz Xaver Winterhalter (b. 1816)
  - Juho Halme, 29, Finnish Olympic track and field athlete; executed by Red Guards during the Finnish Civil War (b. 1888)

== February 2, 1918 (Saturday) ==
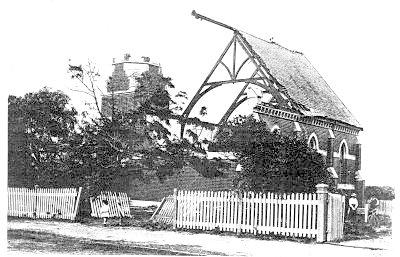
The Methodist Church in Brighton, Victoria, Australia destroyed by a tornado.

- Soviet–Ukrainian War – Militias led by Ukrainian independence leader Symon Petliura entered Kiev and stormed the Arsenal Factory where workers in support of the Bolsheviks were barricaded.
- A pair of tornadoes struck Brighton, Victoria, Australia, at the same time, killing two people and injuring six others. Property damages from the storm were estimated to be between A£100,000 and 150,000.
- The Defence Command of Finland was established.
- The Luftstreitkräfte reorganized its fighter wings Jagdstaffel 2, with Bruno Loerzer as its first commanding officer, and Jagdstaffel 3, with Adolf Ritter von Tutschek in command.
- The Cape-Kootjieskolk to Calvinia rail line, stretching a total 43 miles 47 chains (70.1 kilometres), opened in South Africa.
- Born:
  - Hella Haasse, Dutch writer, author of Oeroeg; as Hélène Serafia Haasse, in Batavia, Dutch East Indies (present-day Jakarta, Indonesia) (d. 2011)
  - Stuart Blanch, British clergy, Archbishop of York from 1975 to 1983; in Blakeney, Gloucestershire, England (d. 1994)
  - Fyffe Christie, British artist, best known for his murals at Glasgow University Union; in Bushey, England (d. 1979)
- Died: John L. Sullivan, 59, American boxer, first world heavyweight boxing champion (b. 1858)

== February 3, 1918 (Sunday) ==
- The Austro-Hungarian Navy Third Fleet put down a mutiny within the Fifth Fleet off Montenegro. About 800 sailors were imprisoned and dozens faced court-martial (with four later executed).
- Finnish Civil War: Battle of Oulu – The White Guard defeated the Reds.
- The Twin Peaks Tunnel, the longest (11,920 feet or 3,630 metres) streetcar tunnel in the world, opened in San Francisco.
- Born:
  - Joey Bishop, American entertainer, member of the "Rat Pack", host of The Joey Bishop Show; as Joseph Abraham Gottlieb, in New York City, United States (d. 2007)
  - Helen Stephens, American runner, two-time gold medalist in the 1936 Summer Olympics; in Fulton, Missouri, United States (d. 1994)
- Died: Ernest Hoben, 54, New Zealand sports executive, co-founder of New Zealand Rugby (b. 1864)

== February 4, 1918 (Monday) ==
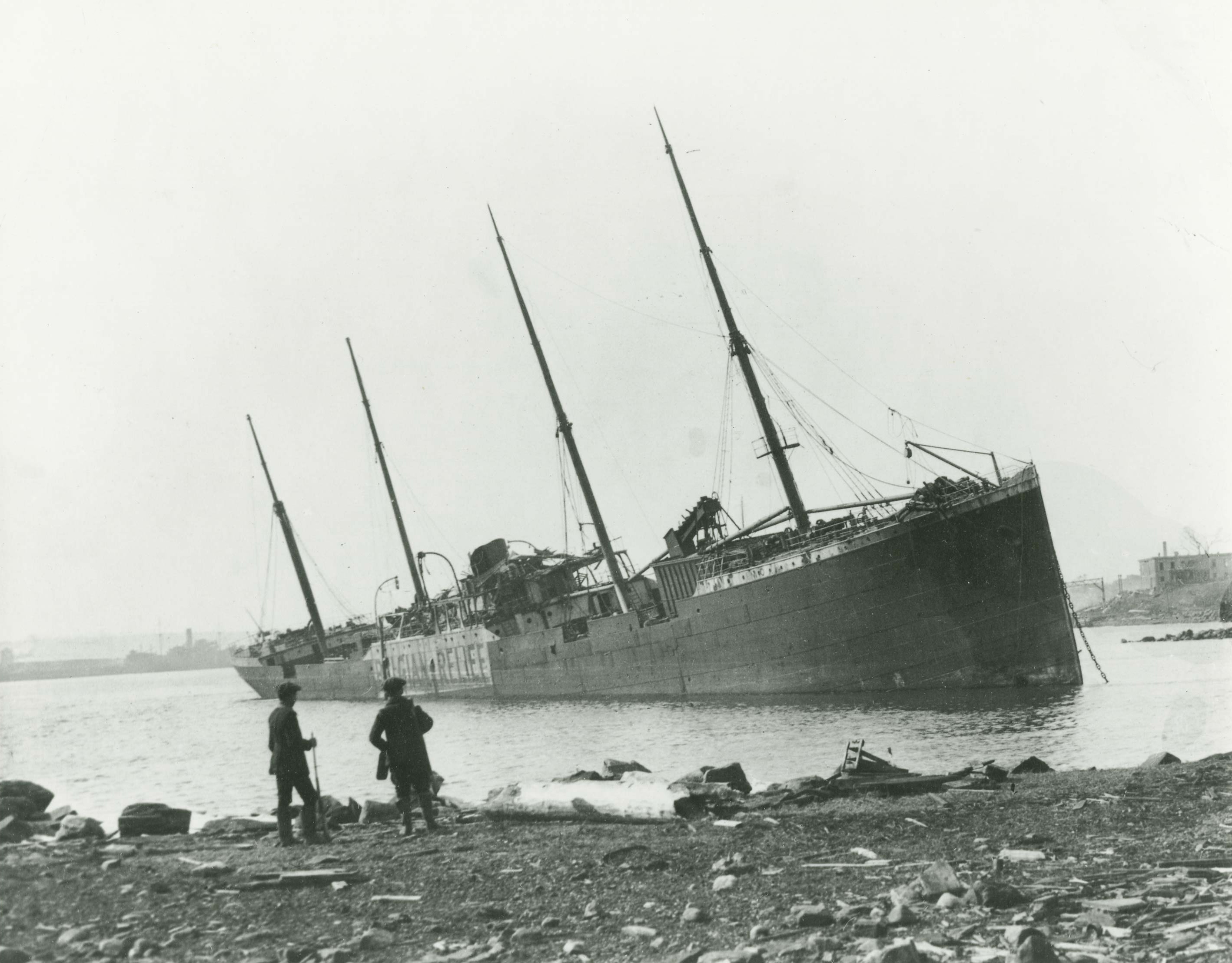
SS Imo aground on the Dartmouth side of the harbour Halifax Explosion in December 1917.

- Soviet–Ukrainian War – Ukrainian militias quelled the armed uprising at the Arsenal Factory in Kiev, resulting in over 300 deaths.
- An election for the Estonian Constituent Assembly was held with the Bolsheviks hoping for a majority to keep Estonia part of Russia. However, they only received 38% of the vote with the majority of the other political parties combined in favor of independence.
- German submarine SM UC-50 was depth charged and sunk in the English Channel by Royal Navy destroyer HMS Zubian, killing all 26 crew.
- A judicial inquiry into the Halifax Explosion last December released a report concluding the captain and crew of the Mont-Blanc were responsible for causing the collision with the ship Imo in Halifax Harbour that eventually started the explosion that destroyed most of the city in Nova Scotia and killed 1,963 people.
- The Imperial German Army established the 19th Army to serve on the Western Front.
- Born: Ida Lupino, English-American actress and filmmaker, known for roles in High Sierra and The Hard Way, director of films including The Hitch-Hiker and The Bigamist and television episodes including Alfred Hitchcock Presents, Thriller, and The Twilight Zone; in London, England (d. 1995)
- Died: Akiyama Saneyuki, 49, Japanese naval officer, chief planner for the Imperial Japanese Navy during the Russo-Japanese War (b. 1864)

== February 5, 1918 (Tuesday) ==
- Soviet–Ukrainian War – Soviet soldiers totaling 7,000 marched on Kiev but met little resistance from the Ukrainian garrison.
- The Decree on Separation of Church and State was adopted by the Russian Soviet Federative Socialist Republic.
- British troopship SS Tuscania, the first ship carrying American troops to Europe, was torpedoed and sunk off the coast of Ireland with 210 killed on board.
- American fighter pilot Stephen W. Thompson achieved the first aerial victory for the United States Army in World War I, shooting down an attacking German Albatros fighter while part of a bombing raid over Saarbrücken, Germany.
- Born: Gara Garayev, Azerbaijani composer, known for works including Symphony No. 3 and The Path of Thunder, two-time recipient of the Order of Lenin; in Baku, Transcaucasian Commissariat (present-day Azerbaijan) (d. 1982)

== February 6, 1918 (Wednesday) ==
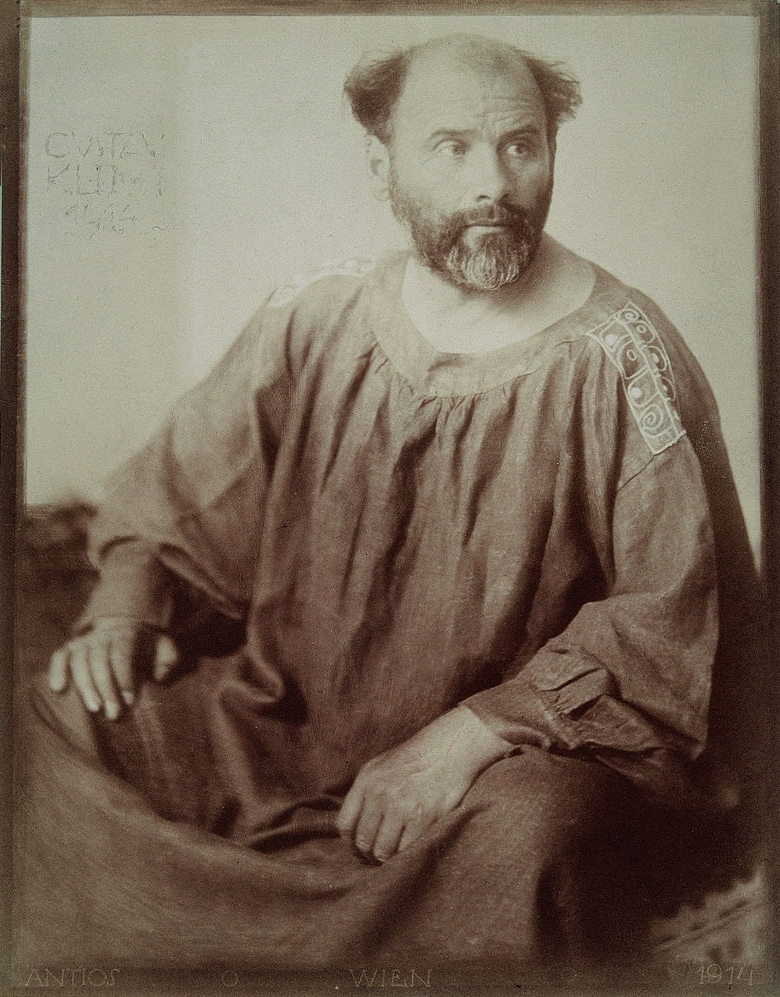
Gustav Klimt

- The Representation of the People Act was enacted to give most British women over the age of 30 the right to vote.
- An attempt by the Finnish White Guards to take Varkaus, Finland, from the Finnish Red Guards failed, resulting in four casualties.
- The Luftstreitkräfte established air squadrons Jagdstaffel 70 and 71.
- The Brooklyn Chamber of Commerce was established in Brooklyn and grew to become the largest chamber of commerce in the state of New York.
- Born:
  - Lothar-Günther Buchheim, German writer, author of Das Boot; in Weimar, German Empire (present-day Germany) (d. 2007)
  - Louis Dudek, Canadian poet, known for his poetry and criticism on modernism in Canada, recipient of the Order of Canada; in Montreal, Canada (d. 2001)
- Died: Gustav Klimt, 55, Austrian painter, member of the Vienna Secession, known for works including Judith I, Portrait of Adele Bloch-Bauer I and The Kiss (b. 1862)

== February 7, 1918 (Thursday) ==
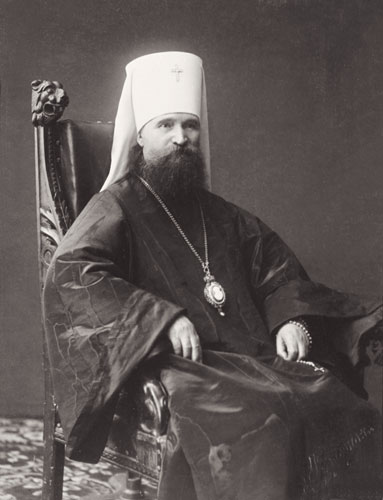
Bishop Vladimir Bogoyavlensky

- Vladimir Bogoyavlensky, Bishop of Kiev, was executed in front of his monks by Red Army soldiers under command of Mikhail Artemyevich Muravyov. His death made him a martyr and was canonized by the Russian Orthodox Church in 1998.
- The sports club Centro Asturiano de México was established in Mexico City initially as a football club called Club Asturia.
- Born:
  - Peter Blau, Austrian-American sociologist, developed social exchange theory; in Vienna, Austria-Hungary (present-day Austria) (d. 2002)
  - Lin Lanying, Chinese chemist, developed the chemical gallium arsenide that is used in circuits, semiconductors and solar panels; in Putian, Republic of China (present-day China) (d. 2003)

== February 8, 1918 (Friday) ==
- Soviet–Ukrainian War – Soviet forces occupied Kiev, forcing the Ukrainian government to relocate to Zhytomyr, Ukraine.
- German submarine SM UB-38 struck a mine and sank in the North Sea with the loss of all 27 crew.
- Royal Navy destroyer HMS Boxer collided with another ship in the English Channel and sank with all but one crew rescued.
- The Lafayette Escadrille, the American volunteer squadron serving in the French Army, was transferred to the United States Army to become the 103rd Aero Squadron.
- The United States replaced the star insignia for its military aircraft adopted in 1917 with a roundel that contained an outer red ring, an inner blue ring, and a white center. The Allies requested the change out of a fear that the star could be mistaken for a German cross.
- The York Daily Record in York, Pennsylvania, released a news article on Jim McIlherron, a son of a black landowner in Estill Springs, Tennessee, who was lynched and burned alive by a mob following a manhunt and shootout with local police. McIlherron was on the run after shooting three young white men he accused of throwing rocks at him. A grand jury later concluded there was little substantial evidence to charge any members of the lynch mob.
- The British Army established the 4th Guards Brigade when it reorganized its brigades from four to three battalions for the Western Front.
- Tbilisi State University was established in Tbilisi, Georgia, the first post-secondary education institution of its time in the Caucasus region.
- Born: Freddie Blassie, American professional wrestler, prominent early member of the World Wrestling Federation; as Frederick Kenneth Blassie, in St. Louis, United States (d. 2003)
- Died: Louis Renault, 74, French lawyer, recipient of the Nobel Peace Prize for his working on developing international law (b. 1843)

== February 9, 1918 (Saturday) ==
- The Central Powers signed an exclusive protectorate treaty with the Ukrainian People's Republic as part of the negotiations that took place in Brest-Litovsk, Belarus.
- A violent rail strike grounded much of Argentina, with federal troops mobilized to prevent anarchists from destroying rail tracks and train cars carrying grain.
- German agricultural equipment manufacturer Fella-Werke was established in Feucht, Germany.

== February 10, 1918 (Sunday) ==
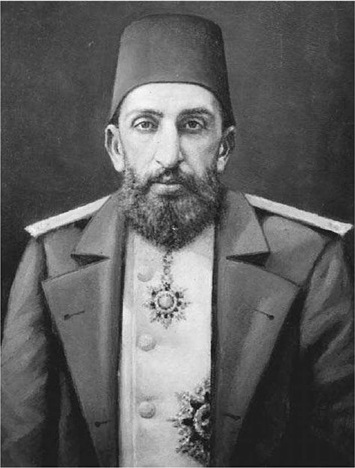
Turkish Sultan Abdul Hamid II

- Marco Fidel Suárez won the presidential election in Colombia over opponent Guillermo Valencia with 54% of the vote, becoming the ninth President of Colombia.
- Invasion of Åland – A squad of 460 Finnish White Guards landed on the Åland Islands in the Baltic Sea in an attempt to discourage a local group from advocating secession from Finland and union with Sweden during the Finnish Civil War.
- A shootout between a group of lawmen and the Powers, a family of miners, at their cabin in the Galiuro Mountains of Arizona resulted in four deaths and the start of the largest manhunt in the state's history. Jeff Power, Sheriff Robert F. McBride, Undersheriff Martin R. Kempton and Deputy Sheriff Thomas Kane Wooten of the Graham County, Arizona Sheriff's Office were killed in the shootout.
- The Ministry of Information was established for the Government of the United Kingdom, with Lord Beaverbrook appointed as minister.
- The Royal Flying Corps established air squadron No. 148 at RAF Andover, England.
- The sports club Raufoss was established in Raufoss, Norway.
- Born: Albert Geyser, South African theologian, member of the Dutch Reformed Church in South Africa and anti-apartheid activist; as Albertus Geyser, in Naboomspruit, Union of South Africa (present-day Mookgophong, South Africa) (d. 1985)
- Died:
  - Abdul Hamid II, 75, Turkish noble, 34th Sultan of the Ottoman Empire (b. 1842)
  - Johannes Wilhelm Colenbrander, 62, Natal-born British soldier and colonial official, drowned with two other actors during filming of Symbol of Sacrifice (b. 1855)
  - Ernesto Teodoro Moneta, 84, Italian activist, founder of the Lombard Association for Peace and Arbitration, recipient of the Nobel Peace Prize (b. 1833)

== February 11, 1918 (Monday) ==
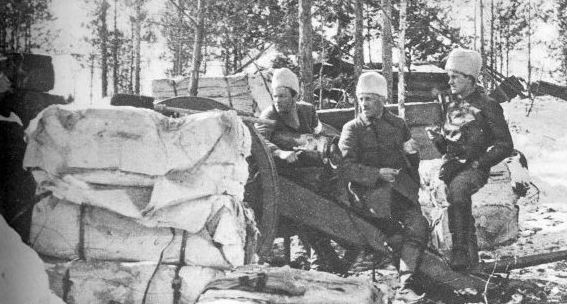
White Guard artillery men during the Battle of Antrea in Finland.

- Battle of Antrea – The Finnish Reds marched on Antrea, Finland, which held an important rail hub for the east half of the country. They captured the villages of Seistola and Ahvola west of the rail town of Hannila but failed to take the community itself.
- German submarine SM U-53 torpedoed and sank British cargo ship SS Merton Hall in the Atlantic Ocean, killing 57 crew.
- Royal Navy Q-ship HMS Westphalia was sunk by German submarine SM U-97 with the loss of 46 crew.
- An internal explosion sank the French submarine Diane in the Bay of Biscay, killing all 43 crew.
- The Defence Command of Finland established its own Intelligence Division.
- The Luftstreitkräfte established air squadrons Jagdstaffel 72 and 73.
- The roof of the Portland–Lewiston Interurban electric rail car barn in Gray, Maine, collapsed under heavy snow.
- Composer Carl Nielsen premiered his symphonic poem Pan and Syrinx in Copenhagen.
- Former employees for Thomas Edison formed the Edison Pioneers society on the same day as the inventor's 71st birthday, although Edison himself was unavailable to attend as he was "engaged in important government service" (rumored to be a secret government weapons project for use in World War I).
- Born:
  - Anne Stine Ingstad, Norwegian archaeologist, co-discoverer of Viking artifacts at L'Anse aux Meadows, Newfoundland; as Anne Kirstine Moe, in Lillehammer, Norway (d. 1997)
  - Lawrence H. Johnston, American physicist, member of the Manhattan Project, only man to witness all three atomic explosions in 1945 including the Trinity nuclear test and the atomic bombings of Hiroshima and Nagasaki; in Shandong, Republic of China (present-day China) (d. 2011)
- Died:
  - Alexey Kaledin, 56, Russian army officer, commander of the Don Cossacks during the Kaledinschina counterrevolution against the Soviet government; died by suicide (b. 1861)
  - Taytu Betul, 66-67, Ethiopian noble, Consort for the Ethiopian Empire from 1889 to 1913 (b. 1851)

== February 12, 1918 (Tuesday) ==
- The Donetsk–Krivoy Rog Soviet Republic was established with the city Kharkov as its capital.
- Battle of Antrea – In early stages of the battle, White Guard commander Aarne Sihvo disobeyed an order to retreat across the Vuoksi River and instead ordered his forces to recapture the village of Ahvola, Finland from the Red Guards. The attack was successful and Sihvo was promoted to commander of all White forces in the area.
- Royal Navy cruiser HMS Roxburgh rammed and sunk German submarine SM U-89 in the Atlantic Ocean, killing all 43 crew.
- The Austro-Hungarian patrol steamship Pelagosa sank west of the islet of Grujica after being torpedoed by the Italian F 7 submarine; all crew survived.
- Born:
  - Julian Schwinger, American physicist, recipient of the Nobel Prize in Physics for research into quantum electrodynamics; in New York City, United States (d. 1994)
  - Norman Farberow, American psychologist, considered the founder of modern suicidology, co-founder of the Los Angeles Suicide Prevention Center; in Pittsburgh, United States (d. 2015)
  - Werner Schröer, German air force officer, commander of the Jagdgeschwader 27 and Jagdgeschwader 3 for the Luftwaffe during World War II, recipient of the Knight's Cross of the Iron Cross; in Mülheim, German Empire (present-day Germany) (d. 1985)

== February 13, 1918 (Wednesday) ==
- An earthquake struck Shantou, China with a strength of 7.2 in magnitude, killing 2,000 people and injuring a thousand more.
- French submarine Bernoulli struck a mine and sank in the Adriatic Sea with all 23 crew lost.
- British cellist May Mukle and her peers, violinists Rebecca Clarke and Marjorie Hayward, gave a recital at the Aeolian Hall in New York City, performing works by Hubert Parry, Frank Bridge, and the premiėre of Morpheus, written by Clarke under the pen-name "Anthony Trent".
- Born:
  - Patty Berg, American golfer, founding member of the LPGA, winner of the U.S. Women's Open in 1946; as Patricia Jane Berg, in Minneapolis, United States (d. 2006)
  - Junichi Sasai, Japanese air naval officer, member of the Tainan Air Group during World War II, recipient of the Order of the Golden Kite; in Tokyo, Empire of Japan (present-day Japan) (d. 1942, killed in action during the Guadalcanal campaign)
- Died: Henry Arthur Blake, 78, British colonial administrator, 12th Governor of Hong Kong, 19th Governor of Ceylon and 65th Governor of Jamaica (b. 1840)

== February 14, 1918 (Thursday) ==
- Russia switched from the Julian calendar to the Gregorian calendar, with the date skipping from January 31 to February 14. As a result, the October Revolution was to have occurred in November following the conversion.
- Invasion of Åland – A White Guards unit took the Russian-held villages of Prästö and the telegraph station in Sund on the Åland Islands.
- The United States Army established the 278th Aero Squadron at Love Field, Dallas, Texas.
- A U.S. Army air naval station was established at Aghada, Ireland, but closed the following year.
- The Broadway musical Sinbad, by Harold R. Atteridge with music by Sigmund Romberg, opened at the Winter Garden Theatre in New York City with Al Jolson in the lead role. It ran for 164 performances.
- Died: Cecil Spring Rice, 58, British diplomat, Ambassador of the United Kingdom to the United States from 1912 to 1918 (b. 1859)

== February 15, 1918 (Friday) ==
- Invasion of Åland – Sweden landed forces at Eckerö on the Åland Islands to safeguard Swedish-held territory from the White Guards.
- Battle of Rarańcza – Polish forces under the command of Józef Haller attempted to break through Austrian lines at Rarancza, Bukovina in Eastern Europe.
- A German navy squadron of Korvettenkapitän Heinecke's 2nd Flotilla of the High Seas Fleet clashed with patrolling British ships in the Strait of Dover, resulting in nine lost ships and 22 sailors and officers killed, 13 wounded, and 54 missing. There were no German casualties.
- Mortar Board, the first American honor society for female college students, held its inaugural meeting at Syracuse University, New York.
- The Metal Central of the State was established to manage imports and exports in Norway affected by World War I.
- The football club Skarphedin was established in Osterøy, Norway. It merged in 1946 with clubs Mjeldalen and Skarpodder to become Osterøy IL. It now offers football, handball, track and field, gymnastics and Nordic skiing.
- Born:
  - Allan Arbus, American actor, best known for the role of Dr. Sidney Freeman on M*A*S*H; in New York City, United States (d. 2013)
  - Hank Locklin, American country music songwriter, known for country hits including "Please Help Me, I'm Falling" and "Send Me the Pillow You Dream On"; as Lawrence Hankins Locklin, in McLellan, Florida, United States (d. 2009)
  - Joël Le Tac, French resistance fighter, key player in Operation Savanna and Operation Josephine B during World War II; in Paris, France (d. 2005)
- Died: Vernon Castle, 30, American dancer, noted for his partnership with wife Irene in promoting modern ballroom dancing; died in a plane crash (b. 1887)

== February 16, 1918 (Saturday) ==
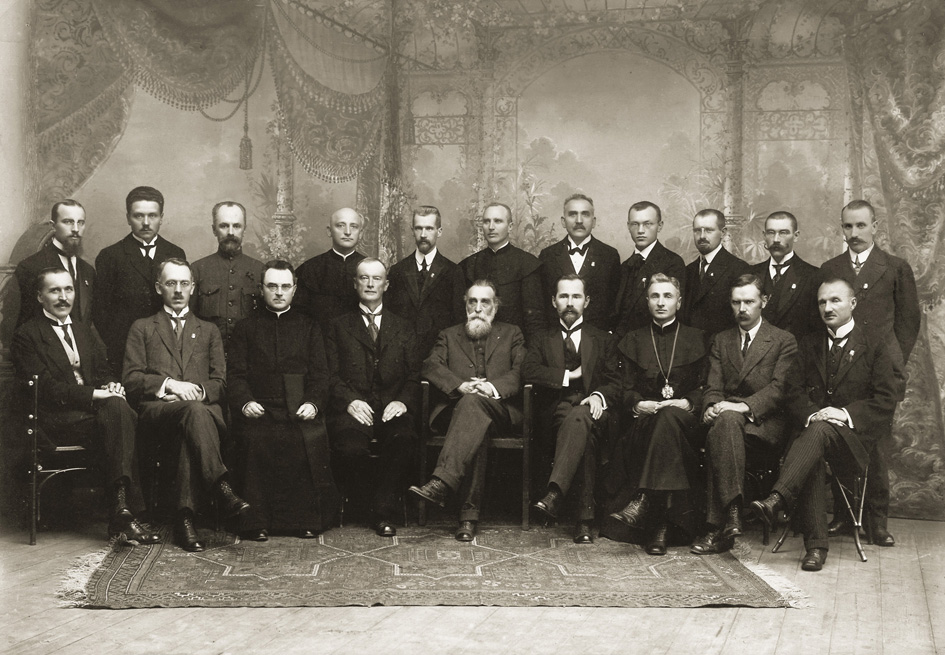
The original 20 members of the Council of Lithuania after signing the Act of Independence of Lithuania.

- The Council of Lithuania declared independence from Russia.
- Battle of Rarańcza – Polish forces defeated Austrian forces at Rarancza, Bukovina with some accounts recording heavy casualties.
- Four German Riesenflugzeug bombers raided England. A single 1,000-kg (2,205-lb) bomb was to be dropped on London Victoria station, but it landed half a mile away on the Royal Hospital in Chelsea, London, England.
- The Luftstreitkräfte established air squadrons Jagdstaffel 74 and 75.
- The first solo exhibition of Spanish artist Joan Miró opened at the Galeries Dalmau in Barcelona but his work was ridiculed and defaced by many of the patrons.
- Japanese silicon manufacturer Tokuyama Corporation was established in Tokuyama, Yamaguchi, Japan.
- Born:
  - Patty Andrews, American singer, member of The Andrews Sisters; in Mound, Minnesota, United States (d. 2013)
  - Gordon M. Graham, American air force officer, commander of United States Forces Japan and Fifth Air Force in 1970, two-time recipient of the Distinguished Flying Cross and 30 Air Medals; in Ouray, Colorado, United States (d. 2008)
- Died: Károly Khuen-Héderváry, 68, Hungarian state leader, 14th Prime Minister of Hungary (b. 1849)

== February 17, 1918 (Sunday) ==
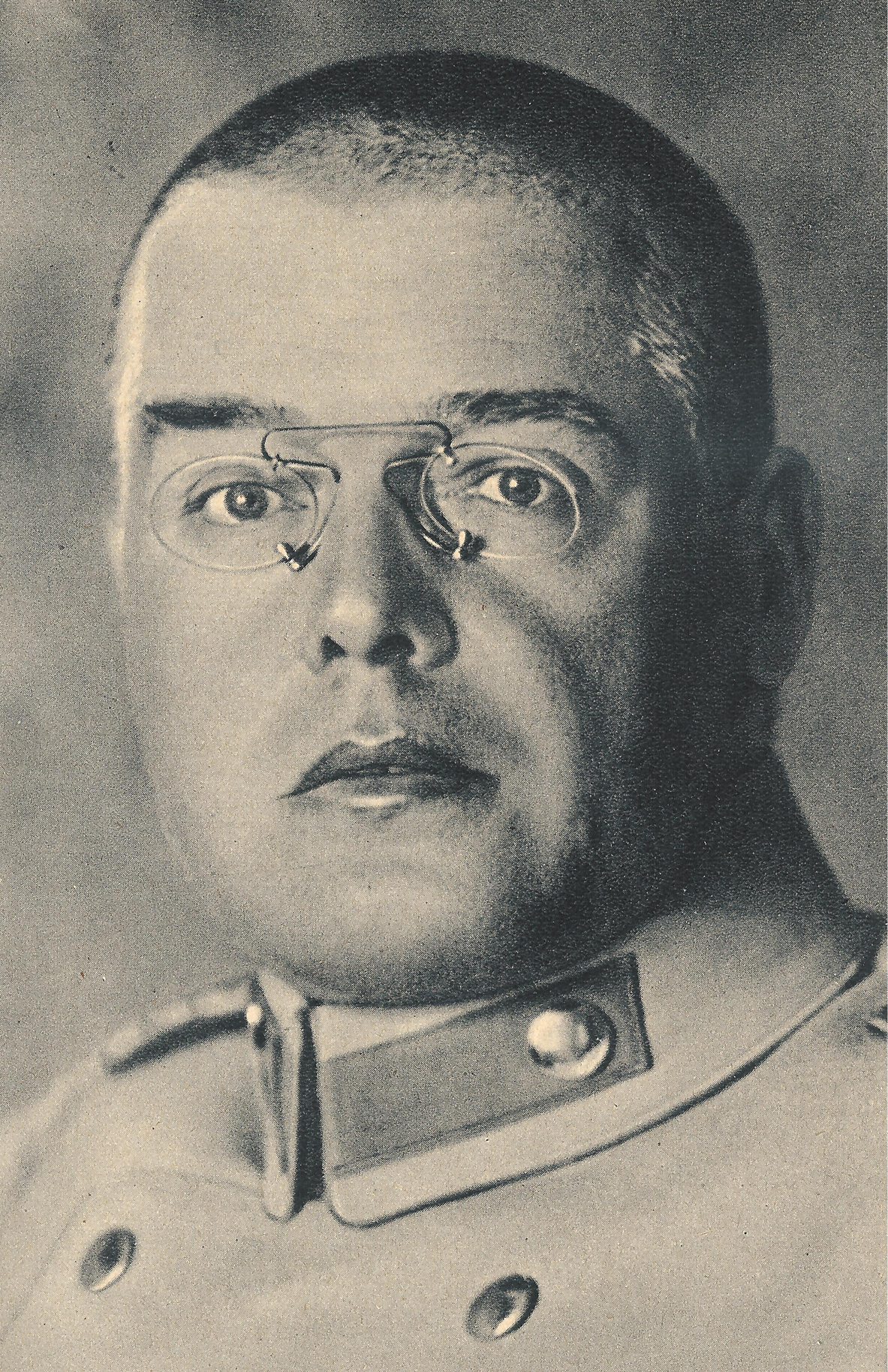
General Max Hoffmann

- German General Chief of Staff Max Hoffmann announced an end of the cease-fire with Russia following a breakdown in peace talks.
- Notified that the ceasefire with the Central Powers was ending, Vladimir Lenin ordered the Baltic Fleet of the Imperial Russian Navy to leave Tallinn, Estonia and sail to Helsinki.
- Invasion of Åland – A Finnish Red Guard unit of 150 men landed on the Åland Islands to help the Russians posted defend against the White Guards and the Swedes already in the region. Meanwhile, the White Guards captured the village of Godby in Finström while the Russians retained the village Jomala and the artillery fort of Sålis.
- A single German bomb attack hit St Pancras railway station in London, killing 21 people and injuring 32.
- Born: William Bronk, American poet, known for his poetry collection Life Supports, recipient of the National Book Award for Poetry; in Fort Edward, New York, United States (d. 1999)

== February 18, 1918 (Monday) ==
- Operation Faustschlag – The Central Powers launched a final offensive code-named "Operation Fist Punch" on the Eastern Front to take advantage of crumbling Russian resistance. A total 53 divisions were involved in a three-pronged attack, with the northern force advancing on Pskov, Russia and Narva, Estonia, the central force pushing towards Smolensk, and the southern force towards Kiev. Daugavpils, Latvia was captured on the first day of the offense.
- Local White Guard military staff met in Pieksämäki, Finland to discuss plans to capture Varkaus from the Red Guard.
- British authorities began operations against the Marri and Khetran tribes in Balochistan, British India.
- The Sisters of Mercy founded Villa Maria College in Christchurch, New Zealand with 14 students.
- The main train station for Poughkeepsie, New York, was opened.

== February 19, 1918 (Tuesday) ==
- The Egyptian Expeditionary Force began attacking Ottoman defenses in the Jordan Valley east of Jerusalem.
- The Imperial Russian Navy began evacuating the first of their ships from Tallinn, Estonia through thick ice over the Gulf of Finland.
- Battle of Varkaus – A force of 1,000 White Guards attacked Varkaus, Finland. The 1,200 Red Guards in the city were lightly armed despite their numbers, with only 150 rifles among them.
- Invasion of Åland – Sweden dispatched another regiment to the Åland Islands to press the remaining Russian units to leave.
- Born:
  - Fay McKenzie, American actress, starred in both silent and sound films including Station Content, Down Mexico Way and Cowboy Serenade; as Eunice Fay McKenzie, in Hollywood, Los Angeles, United States (d. 2019)
  - Forest Evashevski, American college football coach, manager for the Washington State Cougars football team from 1950 to 1951 and the Iowa Hawkeyes football team from 1952 to 1960; in Detroit, United States (d. 2009)
  - Andrija Puharich, American medical researcher, endorser of paranormal individuals including Uri Geller and Peter Hurkos; as Henry Karel Puharić, in Chicago, United States (d. 1995)

== February 20, 1918 (Wednesday) ==
- Invasion of Åland – Finnish army officer Carl Gustaf Emil Mannerheim, commander of the White Guards in the Finnish Civil War, issued an order for the White Guards to retreat from the Åland Islands, although it was ruse to dispatch a larger invasion force to take the islands and set it up as a staging ground for a siege on the Red Guard capital of Turku in southwest Finland.
- Battle of Varkaus – The White Guards surrounded Varkaus, Finland.
- German military command issued a memorandum directing air squadrons to support ground troops with suppressing aerial fire for the upcoming spring offensive on the Western Front, the first time aircraft worked in tandem with ground units in military operations.
- The Order of Sleeping Car Conductors was established in Kansas City, Missouri.
- Born:
  - Leonore Annenberg, American business leader, 23rd Chief of Protocol of the United States, president of the Annenberg Foundation, wife to publisher Walter Annenberg; as Leonore Cohn, in New York City, United States (d. 2009)
  - Ben Klassen, Ukrainian-American religious leader and white supremacist, founder of the Creativity movement; as Bernhardt Klassen, in Rudnerweide, Ukraine (d. 1993)

== February 21, 1918 (Thursday) ==
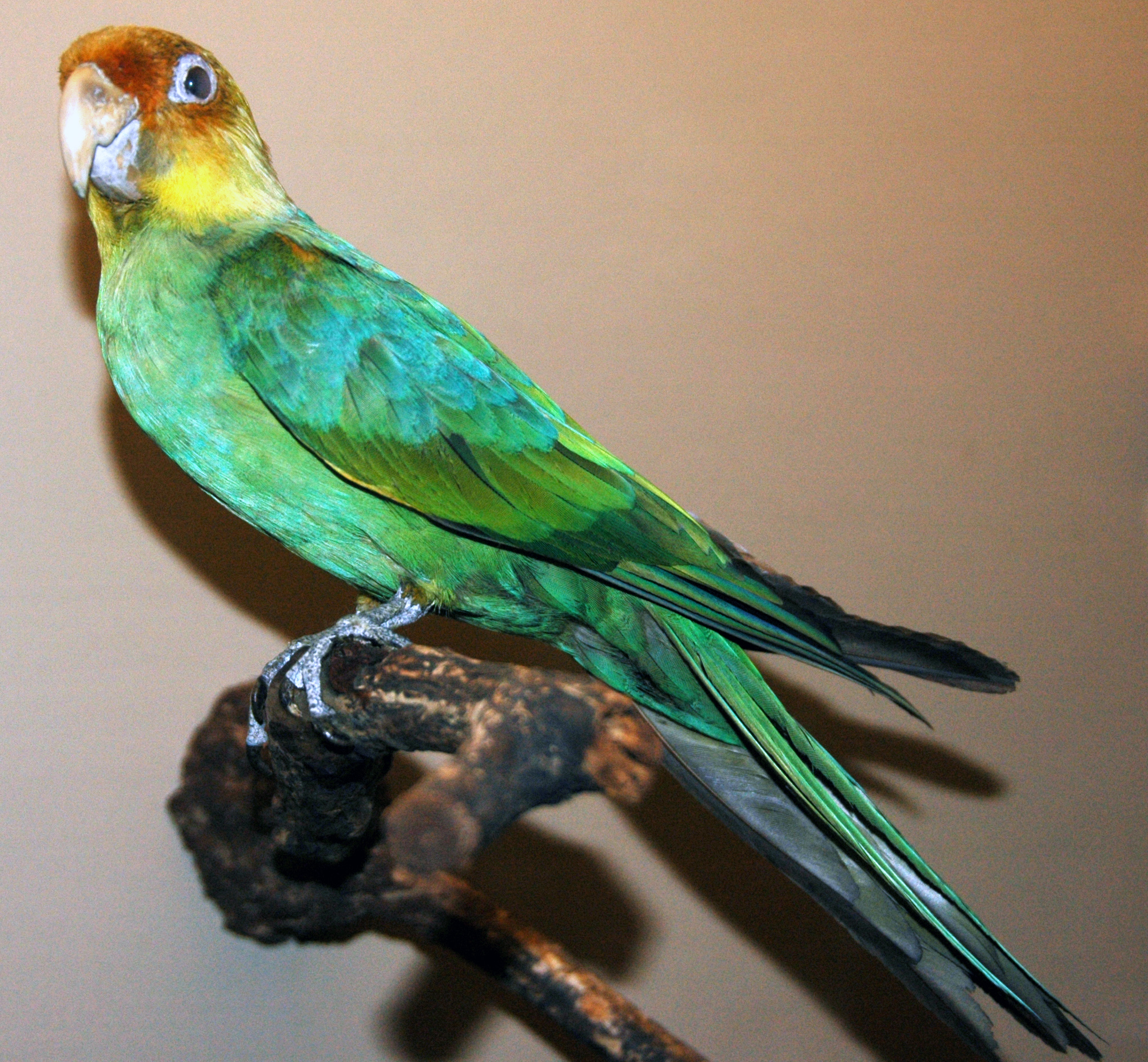
The last Carolina parakeet dies at the Cincinnati Zoo.

- The Egyptian Expeditionary Force occupied Jericho, beginning the British occupation of the Jordan Valley in Palestine. The British force lost 510 casualties but captured 144 Ottoman prisoners and eight machine guns.
- Operation Faustschlag – The Central Powers captured Minsk during "Operation Fist Punch".
- Battle of Rautu – Fighting commenced between the White Guards against the Red Guards at Rautu Finland (now Russia). Russia provided much support for the Red Guards as the rail station at Rautu was located 60 kilometers north of Petrograd and had the potential to be a staging area for an attack on the Russian capital.
- Battle of Varkaus – The Red Guards, outgunned, retreated from Varkaus, Finland, with 700 holed up in a pulp mill in Ahlström. After running out of ammo, the force surrendered at 10:00 pm. A total of 20 Red Guards were killed, along with a dozen men from the White Guard force.
- Austrian submarine SM U-23 was sunk in the Strait of Otranto by an Italian destroyer, killing all 18 crew.
- Incas the last captive Carolina parakeet (the only parrot species native to the eastern United States) died at the Cincinnati Zoo in the same enclosure where Martha, the last passenger pigeon, died in 1914.
- The Charles Cuvillier operetta The Lilac Domino opened for its second run at the Empire Theatre in London.
- Died: William H. Workman, 79, American politician, 18th Mayor of Los Angeles (b. 1839)

== February 22, 1918 (Friday) ==
- Russian icebreaker Yermak began cutting a path through the ice in the Gulf of Finland for the bulk of the retreating Imperial Russian Navy Baltic Fleet to follow.
- Operation Faustschlag – The Central Powers offensive advance was so rapid that in a week it had advanced 150 miles (240 km) and was within 100 miles (160 km) of Petrograd. Much of the advance was done by rail, with German General Max Hoffmann writing in his diary: "It is the most comical war I have ever known. We put a handful of infantrymen with machine guns and one gun onto a train and rush them off to the next station; they take it, make prisoners of the Bolsheviks, pick up few more troops, and so on. This proceeding has, at any rate, the charm of novelty."
- Invasion of Åland – Russia confirmed their forces would be leaving the Åland Islands, with 300 Russian Finnish Red Guards redeployed to Turku, Finland.
- A Soviet decree, initially thought to be released by Vladimir Lenin but later attributed to Leon Trotsky, ordered citizens to defend the territory to "the last drop of blood" and destroy any food provisions before having them fall to enemy hands as the Central Powers "Operation Fist Punch" closed in on Petrograd. The decree further disrupted peace talks between Soviet Russia and the Central Powers.
- The United States Army Air Corps established the 73rd Aero Squadron at Rich Field, Texas.
- Born:
  - Charlie Finley, American sports executive, owner of the Oakland Athletics from 1960 to 1980; as Charles Oscar Finley, in Ensley, Alabama, United States (d. 1996)
  - Sid Abel, Canadian hockey player, centre for the Detroit Red Wings and Chicago Blackhawks from 1938 to 1954, three-time Stanley Cup champion; as Sidney Gerald Abel, in Melville, Saskatchewan, Canada (d. 2000)
  - Don Pardo, American television personality, announcer for Saturday Night Live from 1975 to 2014; as Dominick George Pardo Jr., in Westfield, Massachusetts, United States (d. 2014)
  - Robert Wadlow, American personality, officially the tallest man ever according to Guinness World Records; in Alton, Illinois, United States (d. 1940)
  - Alfred J. Gross, Canadian-American inventor, patented early Wireless communication including the walkie-talkie, Citizens band radio, the pager, and the cordless telephone; as Irving Gross, in Toronto, Canada (d. 2000)
- Died: Terry McGovern, 37, American boxer, World Bantamweight Champion and World Lightweight Champion in 1899, World Featherweight Champion in 1900 (b. 1880)

== February 23, 1918 (Saturday) ==
- The first drafting of new recruits for Soviet Russia were held in Petrograd and Moscow while the first professional infantry units fought occupying German forces, marking it as the unofficial birth of the Red Army.
- Battle of Rautu – The force of 1,0000 Finnish Red Guards were forced to retreat from Rautu, Finland and were encircled on three sides by Finnish White Guards days later, with the only escape route leading back to Petrograd. The Red Guards dug trenches and began holding off White Guard attacks for several weeks.
- Newfoundland passenger ship Florizel ran aground in a winter sea storm at Cappahayden, Newfoundland, killing 94 passengers and crew. An SOS was sent out as the 44 survivors took shelter in the undamaged part of the ship until rescue the following day.
- The Estonian Red Riflemen were established.
- Arthur Scherbius applied to patent the Enigma machine.
- Pompton Township, New Jersey, was split up into three separate boroughs including Bloomingdale, Ringwood, and Wanaque.
- Born: Robert T. Smith, American air force officer, member of the Flying Tigers squadron and commander of the 337th Fighter Squadron during World War II, recipient of the Distinguished Flying Cross from both the United States and United Kingdom, the Air Medal and Silver Star; in York, Nebraska, United States (d. 1995)
- Died:
  - Adolphus Frederick, 35, German royalty, last monarch for the Grand Duchy of Mecklenburg-Strelitz; died by suicide (b. 1882)
  - Noman Çelebicihan, 32-33, Crimean state leader, president of the Crimean People's Republic; executed (b. 1885)
  - Thomas Brassey, 82, British politician, 9th Governor of Victoria (b. 1836)

== February 24, 1918 (Sunday) ==
- Estonia declared its independence from Russia after seven centuries of foreign rule.
- The Imperial Russian Navy completed their evacuation of the Baltic Fleet from Tallinn, Estonia.
- Operation Faustschlag – The Central Powers captured Zhytomyr, Ukraine during "Operation Fist Punch".
- Battle of Antrea – A front line between the White Guards and the Red Guards formed around the villages of Ahvola and Pullila east of Antrea. Both sides, evenly matched at 1,500 men, engaged in trench warfare that dragged the battle out for several weeks, long enough that it was nicknamed "Verdun of Finland" in reference to the 1916 battle at Verdun, France.
- Invasion of Åland – Sweden landed a second force at Eckerö and took control of the entire Åland Islands by March 2, although there were still 1,200 disarmed Russian soldiers present on the islands.
- A general election began in Spain to elect the 17th Cortes Generales, with final results tallied on March 10.
- The United States Army established the Second Corps for action on the Western Front.
- Born: Hans Berglund, Swedish canoeist, gold medalist at the 1948 Summer Olympics; in Stockholm, Sweden (d. 2006)
- Died: Voltaire P. Twombly, 76, American army officer, recipient of the Medal of Honor for action at Battle of Fort Donelson during the American Civil War (b. 1842)

== February 25, 1918 (Monday) ==
- Operation Faustschlag – German forces captured Tallinn, Estonia. Rather than recognize the country's declaration of independence the day before, Germany overthrew the Estonian government and made the country part of the German Empire.
- Finnish White Guards commander Carl Gustaf Emil Mannerheim declared officers could carry out executions of Red Guard prisoners at their discretion. The "shoot on the spot" declaration lead to the massacre of 180 communist Finns following the Battle of Varkaus in what was referred to as the "Lottery of Huruslahti".
- The film romantic comedy Headin' South, starring Douglas Fairbanks and directed by Arthur Rosson, was released to become one of the top 10 grossing films for the year. The film is now considered lost.
- Born:
  - Barney Ewell, American runner, two-time silver medalist and gold medalist at the 1948 Summer Olympics; as Henry Norwood Ewell, in Harrisburg, Pennsylvania, United States (d. 1996)
  - Bobby Riggs, American tennis player, held the top world ranking in tennis in 1939, 1946 and 1947; as Robert Larimore Riggs, in Los Angeles, United States (d. 1995)

== February 26, 1918 (Tuesday) ==
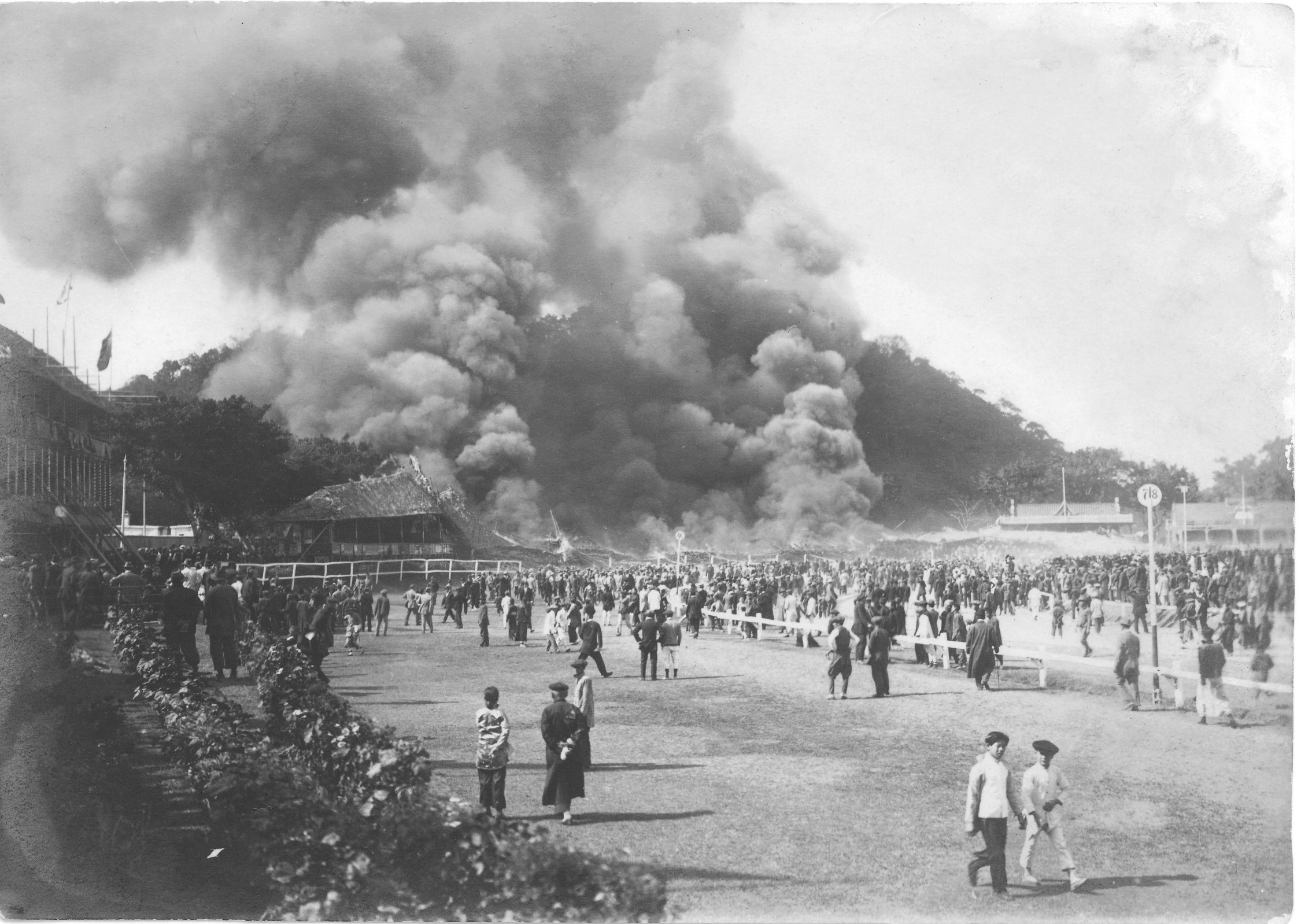
A fire kills hundreds at the Happy Valley Racecourse in Hong Kong.

- A massive fire at the Happy Valley Racecourse in Hong Kong killed 590 people.
- Royal Navy hospital ship HMHS Glenart Castle was torpedoed and sunk in the Bristol Channel by German submarine SM UC-56, killing 162 passengers and crew.
- U.S. Navy tugboat USS Cherokee foundered in the Atlantic Ocean with the loss of 32 of her 42 crew.
- Born:
  - Herbert Blaize, Grenadian state leader, 6th Prime Minister of Grenada; in Carriacou, Grenada (d. 1989)
  - Otis Bowen, American politician, 44th Governor of Indiana; in Fulton County, Indiana, United States (d. 2013)
  - Theodore Sturgeon, American science fiction writer, author of More Than Human; as Edward Hamilton Waldo, in Staten Island, New York, United States (d. 1985)
  - Michael Sinclair, British army officer, escapee from the German POW camp at Oflag IV-C at Colditz Castle in Germany, recipient of the Distinguished Service Order; as Albert Michael Sinclair (d. 1944, killed while attempting to escape)
- Died: Edmond Francis Prendergast, 74, American clergy, Archbishop of Philadelphia from 1911 to 1918 (b. 1843)

== February 27, 1918 (Wednesday) ==
- The Fruehauf Trailer Corporation was established in Detroit and began producing the first "semi-trailers".
- Born:
  - Brian Carbury, New Zealand air force officer, one of the four "aces in a day" during the Battle of Britain, recipient of the Distinguished Flying Cross; in Wellington, New Zealand (d. 1961)
  - Thomas Kirby-Green, British air force pilot, member of the escape team from the German POW camp Stalag Luft III; in Dowa, Nyasaland (present-day Malawi) (d. 1944, executed)

== February 28, 1918 (Thursday) ==
- Operation Faustschlag – The Central Powers captured Pskov, Russia and Narva, Estonia during "Operation Fist Punch".
- Invasion of Åland – A German naval unit was dispatched for the Åland Islands.
- The borough of Ocean Gate, New Jersey, was established using portions of Berkeley.
- Born:
  - Alfred Burke, English actor, best known for his role in the BBC series Public Eye; in Peckham, London, England (d. 2011)
  - Pepita Embil, Spanish opera singer, best known for her collaborations with composers Federico Moreno Torroba, Jacinto Guerrero, and Pablo Sorozábal, wife to opera singer Plácido Domingo Ferrer; as Josefa Embil Echániz, in Getaria, Spain (d. 1994)
  - Lim Goh Tong, Chinese-Malaysian business leader, best known for developing the Genting Highlands of Bentong, Malaysia into a resort destination; in Anxi County, Republic of China (present-day China) (d. 2007)
- Died: Hans Mustad, 81, Norwegian business leader, founder of O. Mustad & Son (b. 1837)

== Sources ==
- Franks, Norman L. R.; Bailey, Frank W.; Guest, Russell F. (1993). Above The Lines: The Aces and Fighter Units of the German Air Service, Naval Air Service and Flanders Marine Corps 1914-1918. London, UK: Grub Street. ISBN 978-0-948817-73-1.
- Harjula, Mirko (2010). Itämeri 1914-1921: Itämeren laivastot maailmansodassa sekä Venäjän vallankumouksissa ja sisällissodassa [Baltic Sea 1914-1921: Baltic Fleets in World War I, Russian Revolutions and Civil War] (in Finnish). Helsinki: Books on Demand. ISBN 978-952-49838-3-9.
- Jefford, C.G. (1988). RAF Squadrons. Airlife Publishing Ltd. ISBN 978-1-85310-053-6.
- Roselius, Aapo (2014). The Finnish Civil War 1918: History, Memory, Legacy. Leiden: Brill Publishers. ISBN 978-900-42436-6-8.
