= List of massacres during the Finnish Civil War =

This is a list of massacres during or immediately after the Finnish Civil War. The Finnish Civil War was a conflict in 1918, which killed more than 38,000 people (about one percent of the country's population), of whom 1,650 were victims of the Red Terror, and over 10,000 of the White Terror.

Event	Estimated deaths	Date	Perpetrators	Notes
Suinula massacre	15	31 January	Red Guards	
Vihti executions	17	1 February	Red Guards	
Lottery of Huruslahti	90	February (after Battle of Varkaus)	White Guard	The name lottery refers to the alleged logic of executing one in 10 of the accused.
Pori Lyceum massacre	11	6 February	Red Guards	
Haaga executions	45	12 April	Baltic Sea Division	The only massacre by the German troops in Finland.
Kuurila train murders	22	19 April	Red Guards	
Vyborg provincial prison massacre	30+	27–28 April	Red Guards	
Vyborg massacre	360–420	28 April – 3 May	White Guard	Victims were predominantly Russian.
Jämsä executions	70–80	April – May	White Guard	
Hollola executions	200–500	April – May	White Guard	
Paukaneva executions	40+	April – May	White Guard	
Tampere executions	Hundreds	April – May	White Guard	
Toijala executions	222	April – May	Red Guards, White Guard	Both sides committed executions in the area.
Kouvola and Koria massacres	120		Red Guards, White Guard	Finnish wikipedia
Valkeakoski female guard executions	36	1 May	White Guard	
Jakobstad executions	7	2 May	White Guard	The executed included a White Guard lawyer defending the accused.
Västankvarn executions	62+	2 – 26 May	White Guard	Finnish wikipedia
Harmoinen sick room mass murder	13	10 May	White Guard	Victims were hospital patients.
Koliahde massacre	16	May	Red Guards	
Länkipohja massacre	80+	May	White Guard	
Perttula executions	30–40	18–20 May	White Guard	

== See also ==
- List of massacres in Finland
