= List of massacres in Finland =

The following is a list of massacres that have occurred in Finland (numbers may be approximate):

Name	Date	Location	Deaths	Notes
Åbo Bloodbath	November 10, 1599	Turku	14	
Murder Friday	September 29, 1714	Hailuoto	800	About 200 Cossacks killed almost all the civilians on the island during the Great Wrath.
Klaukkala axe murders	May 10, 1899	Nurmijärvi	7	
Officers' Swimming School	September 1917	Viipuri	20+	Massacre of Kornilovite high-ranking officers by Bolshevism-supporting soldiers
Toijala executions	April 15, 1918	Toijala	100	The Red forces killed about 100 members of the White Guard, bourgeois, civil servants and schoolchildren in the area
Toijala executions	25 April–May 3, 1918	Toijala	122	
Koria massacre	1918	Kouvola	120	
Varkaus executions		Varkaus	170–180	
Suinula massacre	January 31, 1918	Kangasala	17	Thirty seriously wounded.
Vihti executions	February 1, 1918	Vihti	18	
Nurmijärvi murders	February 1, 1918	Nurmijärvi	4	
Pori lyceum massacre	February 6, 1918	Pori	11	
Lottery of Huruslahti	February 21, 1918	Varkaus	90	90 Red Guard prisoners of war were killed by the White Guards
Harmoinen sanatorium massacre	March 10, 1918	Kuhmoinen	13	
Koliahde massacre	March 10, 1918	Noormarkku	16	
Länkipohja massacre	March 16, 1918	Jämsä	80	
Kuurila train murders	April 19, 1918	Hämeenlinna	23	
Lappeenranta massacre	April 25, 1918	Lappeenranta	23	
Viipuri County Prison massacre	27 April–28, 1918	Viipuri	30	
Valkeakoski Women's Guard massacre	May 1, 1918	Valkeakoski	36	
Tampere executions	April–May 1918	Tampere	1,000	Whites executed hundreds of capitulated Reds. See also Battle of Tampere § Aftermath.
Vyborg massacre	April–June 1918	Viipuri	400	Massacre of ethnic Russians and foreigners
Perttula executions	18 May–24, 1918	Nurmijärvi	21	Seven of the victims were murdered on the eighteenth, five on the nineteenth, two on the twentieth, five on the twenty-first and one on the twenty-fourth. One of the victims, Kalle Fredrik Aaltio (b. December 20, 1882), was decapitated on May 19, 1918. As were three other individuals on May 21 of that same year.
Västankvarn executions	2 May–26, 1918	Ingå	60+	
Karhiniemi axe murders	March 17, 1943	Huittinen	6	
Soso railway stop murders	April 3, 1953	Muhos	4	
Lake Bodom murders	June 5, 1960	Espoo	3	1 injured; perpetrator unknown
Pihtipudas police killings	March 7, 1969	Pihtipudas	4	
Raumanmeri school shooting	January 24, 1989	Rauma	2	
Kotka murders	18 April–19, 1994	Kotka	3	
Helsinki Shooting Club killings	February 21, 1999	Helsinki	3	1 injured
Myyrmanni bombing	October 11, 2002	Vantaa	7	159 injured
Jokela school shooting	November 7, 2007	Tuusula	9	1 injured
Kauhajoki school shooting	September 23, 2008	Kauhajoki	11	1 injured
Sello mall shooting	December 31, 2009	Espoo	6	
Hyvinkää shooting	May 26, 2012	Hyvinkää	2	8 injured
2017 Turku attack	August 18, 2017	Turku	2	8 injured + attacker injured

== See also ==
- List of massacres in the Finnish Civil War
