= Battle of Kämärä =

1918 battle of the Finnish Civil War

Coordinates: 60.591440°N 29.044730°E

- Part of the Finnish Civil War
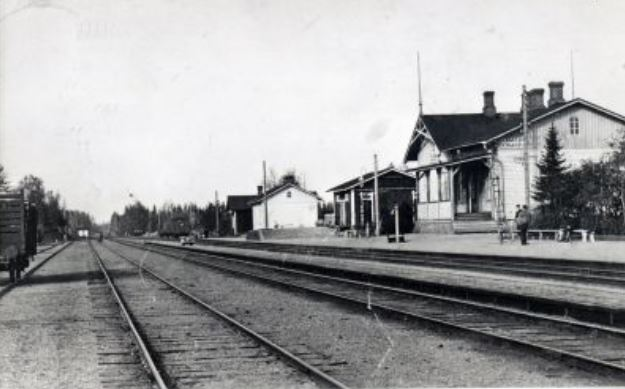
- Kämärä railway station in the 1920s
Date	27 January 1918
Location	Kämärä, Kuolemajärvi, Finland
Result	Red victory: White withdrawal; Red train able to deliver vital war supplies

Belligerents
Finnish Whites	Finnish Reds

Commanders and leaders
Adolf Aminoff	Unknown

Strength
500	500–600

Casualties and losses
18 killed	30 killed

The Battle of Kämärä was a 1918 Finnish Civil War battle fought at the Kämärä (now Gavrilovo, Leningrad oblast, Russia) railway station on 27 January 1918 between the Whites and the Reds. The battle began as a White Guard battalion from Vyborg attacked Kämärä on its march to the White-controlled side of the Karelian Isthmus. After taking the village, the Whites ambushed a Red train carrying a large cargo of weapons from Saint Petersburg, but were finally forced to leave the scene as they ran out of ammunition. The Battle of Kämärä is considered to be the first battle of the Civil War, although some minor incidents had occurred throughout January.

== Background ==
As the violence between the Whites and the Reds escalated in early 1918, one the first fatal clashes occurred in Vyborg, at the time the second largest town in Finland, on 19 January. The Red Guard carried out an inspection at the local shoe factory where the White Guard had stored guns. The incident ended up with three casualties. Four days later, the Vyborg White Guard tried to take over the entire town, but managed to occupy just a few administrative buildings. On the next day, the Red Guard forced the Whites to flee the town. A unit of 500 men, led by the Jäger officer Woldemar Hägglund, marched across the ice of Vyborg Bay to the small island of Venäjänsaari and settled there for a couple of days.

The battalion had some reinforcements from Vyborg, including a doctor, nurses and kitchen staff. Hägglund was named as the commander of the Karelia military district and was replaced by the 62-year-old colonel Adolf Aminoff. Finally, on Friday 26 January, the group left the island. Their plan was to cross the Saint Petersburg-Vyborg railroad in the village of Säiniö (now Cherkasovo, Leningrad oblast), then head north to Antrea, an important railroad junction 30 kilometres north of Vyborg, and join the local Whites. The Aminoff-led squad reached Säiniö in the afternoon, only to find the railway station occupied by the Reds. After a short gunfight, the Whites took the station, but soon a trainload of discharged Russian sailors steamed into Säiniö on its way to Saint Petersburg. As the train stopped, the Russians forced the Whites to retreat and one White fighter was killed. Later that same evening, the Civil War is officially considered to have begun, as the Reds proclaimed the revolution in Helsinki.

== Battle ==
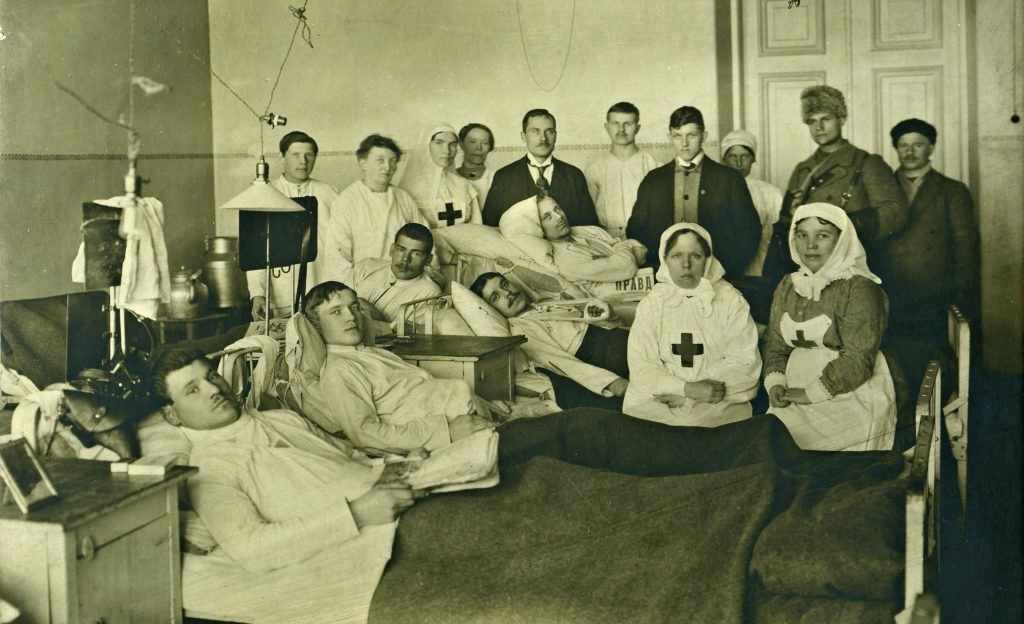
Reds wounded in Kämärä in a Vyborg hospital. The patient lying down at the back is Jukka Rahja

On 27 January, the Whites made a new effort to cross the railway, this time in the village of Kämärä which was located 28 kilometres east of Vyborg. The village was occupied by a small group of Red Guard members from the Vyborg working-class district of Kelkkala. At 2 pm, a fierce gunfight broke out at the railway station and the local Workers' Hall. The Reds were soon outnumbered, and some managed to board a train that came from the direction of Vyborg and stayed at the station for a while. The rest of the Reds fled Kämärä on foot or surrendered.

After the battle, the Whites found a telegram concerning the incoming Saint Petersburg train. It was carrying a cargo of 15,000 rifles, 30 machine guns, 10 artillery pieces and 2 million cartridges which the Red Guard commander-in-chief, Ali Aaltonen, had purchased from the Bolsheviks two weeks previously. The so-called ″Great Gun Train″ was escorted by another train with 400 men of the Saint Petersburg Finnish Red Guard, under the command of the Finnish revolutionary Jukka Rahja and Juho Latukka, the head of the Vyborg Red Guard. The Whites decided to cut the railway line with explosives, but were unable to dig them into the frozen ground. Colonel Aminoff then felt he had no chance of capturing the train and sent most of his men to continue the march towards Antrea. A squad of only 60 men was left in Kämärä. Their task was to ambush the train and cause as much damage as possible. Jukka Rahja met some Reds who had fled from Kämärä at the Leypyasuo railway station and was informed of the situation. Despite this, he still decided to stop the train in Kämärä for some reason.

The train slowly approached the station where the Whites had managed to break some tracks. The locomotive was derailed, but the rest of the train was left undamaged. Some Reds dismounted from the train and the Whites opened fire on them. The Reds soon had their machine guns in position and returned fire. As the Whites ran out of ammunition, they left the scene by skiing. The Reds fired at the retreating enemy with artillery, but, without any observers, the gunnery was inaccurate. The broken tracks were fixed immediately and the Red train was able to leave, delivering its cargo to the Red Guards. The commander, Jukka Rahja, was severely wounded in this engagement and stayed in hospital until the end of the war in May. The Whites reached their destination on 28 January and soon joined the Battle of Antrea which began less than two weeks later.

== Memorial ==
The Whites who participated in the Battle of Kämärä ordered a memorial from the prominent Finnish sculptor Wäinö Aaltonen in 1939. It was never erected at the Kämärä railway station as the village became a part of the Soviet Union after World War II. The statue was finally erected in Helsinki by the National Museum in 1949. In 1974, the memorial was moved to the garrison of the Army Academy in the town of Lappeenranta.
