= William Harrop =

William Harrop may refer to:

- William C. Harrop (1929–2025), U.S. ambassador
- William Harrop (RAF officer), British World War I flying ace
