= Elias Sopanen =

Finnish politician

Elias Walfrid Sopanen (28 September 1863 - 8 April 1926) was a Finnish judge, farmer, and politician. He was born in Savonlinna and belonged at first to the Young Finnish Party, but after its disbandment in 1918, he joined the National Progressive Party. He was Minister of Justice from 21 December 1923 to 18 January 1924. Sopanen served as a Member of the Parliament of Finland from 1913 to 1916. During the Finnish Civil War, Sopanen was the chairman of court that sentenced 87 people to death under unclear circumstances after the Battle of Varkaus. The incident is known as the Lottery of Huruslahti.
