= Rahja =

Rahja is a Finnish surname. Notable people with the surname include:

- Eino Rahja (1885–1936), Finnish-Russian politician
- Jukka Rahja (1887–1920), Russian-Finnish bolshevik

== See also ==
- Raja (disambiguation)
