= Battle of Antrea =

1918 battle of the Finnish Civil War

Coordinates: 60.861936°N 28.962024°E

- Part of the Finnish Civil War in the Russian Civil War
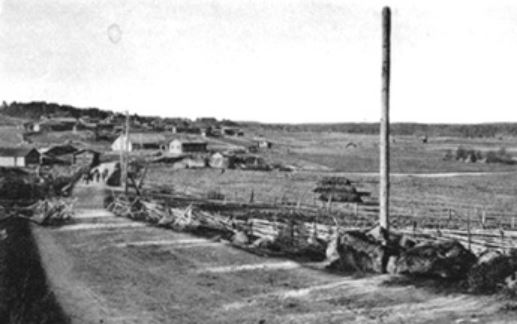
- Ahvola 1918
Date	11 February – 25 April 1918 (2 months and 2 weeks)
Location	Antrea and Jääski, Finland
Result	White victory

Belligerents
Finnish Whites	Finnish Reds (Russian Soviet Federative Socialist Republic) Russian Volunteers

Commanders and leaders
Herman Wärnhjelm; Aarne Sihvo	A. Backman (executed)

Strength
1,500–2,000	2,000–4,000

Casualties and losses
300 killed	324 killed

The Battle of Antrea was a Finnish Civil War battle, fought in Antrea and Jääski in Finland from 11 February to 25 April 1918 between the Finnish Whites and the Finnish Reds.

It was fought alongside the Viipuri–Joensuu railroad between Viipuri, the Red capital in Eastern Finland, and Antrea, an important railroad junction 30 kilometres (19 mi) north of Viipuri. The Reds targeted Antrea, but were stuck between the railway stations of Kavantsaari and Hannila and the nearby villages of Ahvola and Pullila. The most fierce battles were fought in Ahvola, which was a highway crossing a few kilometres west of the railroad. For the last nine weeks, the warfare was mostly trench warfare. Therefore, the battles in Ahvola were called the ″Verdun of Finland″, after the famous 1916 Battle of Verdun, although its size is not significantly comparable with the latter. The battle ended in late April, as the Whites attacked Viipuri from further east and the Reds pulled back to defend the city.

== Units ==
=== Whites ===
The White Army on the Antrea Front included the paramilitary White Guards, the Jäger troops and the Karelian Army. It was first commanded by colonel lieutenant Herman Wärnhjelm who was replaced on 12 February by captain Aarne Sihvo and Woldemar Hägglund as his staff officer.

=== Reds ===
The Red units were composed of the Red Guards from the Viipuri area and further from the Uusimaa region of Southern Finland, mainly from Helsinki, Vantaa, Hyvinkää and Mäntsälä. The Helsinki Red Guard included the famous Jyry Company, which was an elite squad composed of the members of the working-class athletes club Jyry Helsinki. Also a unit of the Women's Red Guard took part at the battle. The Russian volunteer brigades came from Petrograd, Moscow and Siberia. They all left the Antrea Front in late February as the armistice between Soviet Russia and the German Empire was broken and the troops were needed elsewhere. A group of Baltic Fleet sailors were still fighting later in March in Ahvola.

The Reds were commanded by the Red Guards general staff in Viipuri, but they also had a local base in Kavantsaari. The commander-in-chief in Kavantsaari was the little-known factory worker A. Backman. Even his accurate identity is not clear, but Backman was presumably captured and then killed by the Whites in early May.

== The battles ==
=== White retreat from Viipuri ===
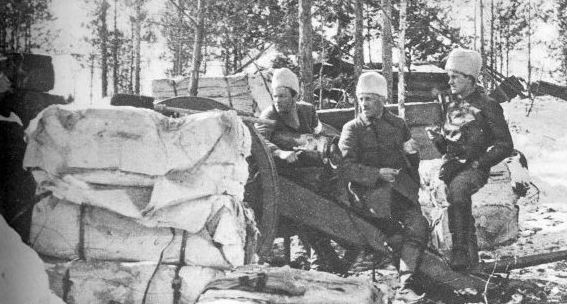
White artillery in Hannila

Three days before the start of the War, the Whites attempted to take Viipuri under their control but failed. The 300-men unit fled the town and headed south across the ice of Viipuri Bay to the small island of Venäjänsaari. On 26 January, the Whites decided to head north of Viipuri to Antrea and meet their main forces. The squad was now led by Adolf Aminoff, a 62-year-old retired colonel of the Russian Imperial Army. It crossed the Petrograd railway in the village of Kämärä, where they had a clash with the Red Guards. The Battle of Kämärä is considered to be the first battle of the Finnish Civil War. After beating the Reds by the Kämärä station, the Whites ambushed a Red train on its way from Petrograd to Finland. The so-called ″Great Gun Train″ was carrying a large cargo of rifles, artillery pieces and ammunition. It was escorted by a squad of 400 members of the Petrograd Finnish Red Guard commanded by the brothers Jukka and Eino Rahja. The train stopped by the station and was surprised by the Whites. After the Reds got their machine guns into shooting positions, the Whites fled Kämärä and continued their journey towards Antrea. The battles in Kämärä ended with 18 killed Whites and up to 30 killed Reds. The Whites finally reached Antrea in 28 January. The local White Guards had taken the railway stations of Kavantsaari and Hannila a day earlier.

=== The early stage ===
As the war started on 27 January, the Viipuri Reds advanced towards Antrea along the Viipuri-Joensuu railway. On 1 February they took the railway station in Tali, 10 kilometres (6.2 mi) north of Viipuri, and the next day the Karisalmi station, 5 kilometres (3.1 mi) further north. On 9 February, the Reds took the Kavantsaari railway station after a minor battle with the Whites. A day later the Reds lost it, but the next day they were joined by reinforcements and took the station back again. On 11 February the Reds also attacked the station of Hannila, but failed. Instead, they took the villages of Seistola and Ahvola, located a few kilometres west of the railroad. Ahvola was an important highway crossing of the Viipuri–Imatra and the Viipuri–Antrea highways.

In 12 February, the White commander Herman Wärnhjelm ordered his men to retreat from Hannila across the Vuoksi river but captain Aarne Sihvo refused to follow the order. Instead, Sihvo ordered his men to attack Ahvola, which the Whites then took. They also made a failed attack against Kavantsaari. Wärnhjelm was now dismissed and replaced by Sihvo. The Reds, in turn, lost a large number of their strength in the following days as the Russian volunteer brigades left the Antrea Front. Some minor attacks were still made, but after 24 February the front line was formed and the battle turned into trench warfare. The two sides now had approximately 1,500 men each in Ahvola and a few hundred more in other positions.

=== Ahvola and Pullila ===
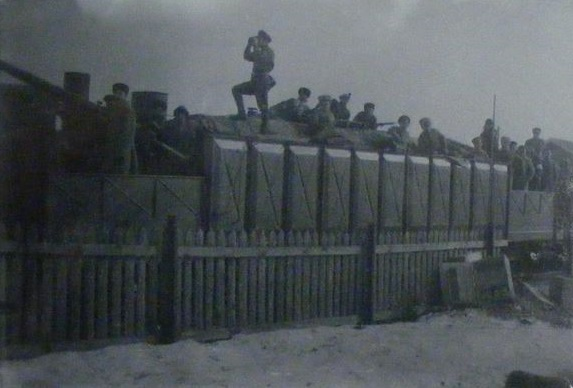
The Red armoured train Ukrainsky Revolutsiya in Viipuri

Since late February, the battle was concentrated in the village of Ahvola, about 5 kilometres (3.1 mi) west of the railway. The Reds attacked the White lines daily at 9 AM and then pulled back to their own trenches as the sun set. During this nine-week period, both sides lost approximately 20 men dead or wounded each day. The village of Pullila, 5 kilometres (3.1 mi) east of the railway, was held by the Reds. The Whites unsuccessfully attacked the village a couple of times.

=== Battles along the railway ===
The five-kilometre part of the railway between Kavantsaari and Hannila was controlled by armoured trains, so there was little infantry activity. The Reds had a Russian armoured train, the Ukrainsky Revolutsiya, which the Bolsheviks had previously used in Ukraine. The other Red armoured train was the Panssarijuna No. 4 (Armoured Train No. 4), made at the Fredriksberg Works in Helsinki. The Whites had an armoured train called the Karjalan pelastaja (The Saviour of Karelia). It was nicknamed after the first battles in Hannila, where the train managed to push the Reds back. The train itself was ″home made″, the Whites had armoured open wagons with bricks and planks and equipped it with a mountain gun and machine guns. The trains made some attacks against each other but usually without heavy losses. The major incident was in 23 March as the Ukrainsky Revolutsiya entered just 250 metres (820 ft) away from the White lines and bombed the Hannila station for 20 minutes. The Whites managed to hit the train with a grenade, but the Ukrainsky Revolutsiya was able to pull back with some help from the Panssarijuna No. 4 and was then sent to Petrograd for repairs.

=== The White Offensive ===
In 23 April, the Whites launched their decisive offensive against Viipuri with 15,000 men. The Antrea Whites now encircled the railway 30 kilometres (19 mi) east via the village of Heinjoki and then closed on Viipuri from the east along the Petrograd railway. The Reds were ordered to leave their positions and pull back to Viipuri on 24–25 April and the White reserves left in Antrea were now able to take Kavantsaari and Pullila without any fighting. After the Battle of Viipuri in 24–29 April, the Civil War in Karelia was over.

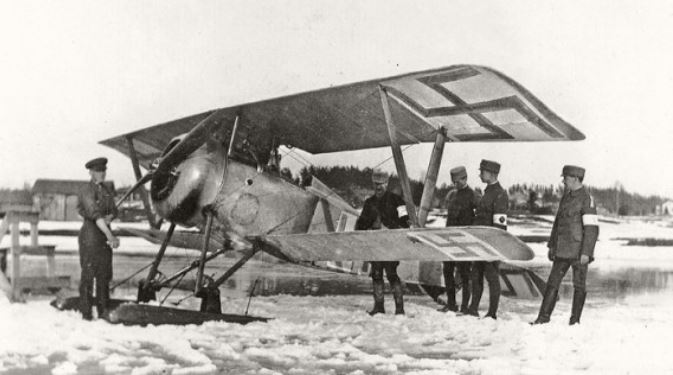
A White Nieuport 17 fighter at the Antrea Airfield

== Aviation ==
=== Whites ===
Two German imported DFW C.V reconnaissance planes were flown to Antrea in late March under the command of the Danish lieutenant Knud von Clauson-Kaas. The planes were not used in action as the Swedish pilots refused to fly in demanding conditions. On 10–11 April, six Russian pilots defected from Soviet Russia and joined the Finnish Whites with a Grigorovich M-9 flying boat, two Nieuport 10 reconnaissance planes and two Nieuport 17 fighters. The pilots were supporters of the Russian White movement. From 13 April, the Russian pilots made reconnaissance flights, bombed the Red positions and dropped propaganda leaflets. The planes operated from the Antrea Airfield, located on the ice of lake Päähkjärvi. This is considered to be the beginning of the Finnish Air Force.

=== Reds ===
The Reds had two Russian Nieuport flying boats which were flown by three Russian pilots. They operated from the ice of the Pantsarlahti Bay in Viipuri. The planes made at least four reconnaissance and bombing flights between late February and the end of March.

== Culture ==
The Finnish composer Leevi Madetoja lost his brother during the Battle of Antrea as Yrjö Madetoja (b. 1885) was presumably captured and killed by the Reds in Kavantsaari on 9 April. Madetoja composed a three-movement piano suite, The Garden of Death, Op. 41, in the memory of his lost brother.
