= William Harrop (RAF officer) =

- Born: Unknown
- Died: Unknown
- Military career
- Allegiance: United Kingdom
- Branch: British Army; Royal Air Force
- Rank: Squadron Leader
- Units: Royal Engineers; No. 104 Squadron RAF
- Awards: Military Medal

Squadron Leader William Harrop MM was a British World War I flying ace credited with five aerial victories while flying as an enlisted observer. He returned to RAF service in World War II, attaining the rank of squadron leader.

== World War I service ==
Harrop was awarded his Military Medal on 14 December 1916, while serving as a pioneer in the Royal Engineers.

Sergeant Harrop served as an observer/gunner aboard the Airco DH.9s of 104 Squadron, teamed with Lt. George Smith. He drove down a Pfalz D.III over Boulay Airfield on 1 August 1918 for his first victory. On a morning patrol on the 12th, Harrop and Smith destroyed another Pfalz D.III, aided Arthur Rullion Rattray and his pilot in destroying an Albatros D.V, and drove down a third German fighter out of control over Saverne. One of these victories was over Vfw. Heinrich Krueger of Jasta 70. Three days later, at 1830 hours, Harrop and Smith drove another Pfalz down out of control, to make both men aces. Both were taken prisoner on 22 August 1918 after a raid on Mannheim. Harrop's final score was 1 (& 1 shared) destroyed, 2 (& 1 shared) 'out of control'.

== World War II ==
Harrop was promoted from warrant officer to flying officer on 29 April 1940, and confirmed in his rank a year later, on 29 April 1941. On 1 March 1942, he was promoted to temporary flight lieutenant.

Harrop became a squadron leader on 1 January 1946. On 1 November 1947, Harrop was reverted to the rank of flight lieutenant, with a seniority date from 1 September 1945. He retired from the RAF on 24 June 1948, and was allowed to retain the rank of squadron leader.
