= Gavrilovo =

Rural locality in Vyborgsky District, Russia

Coordinates: 60.591492°N 29.043417°E

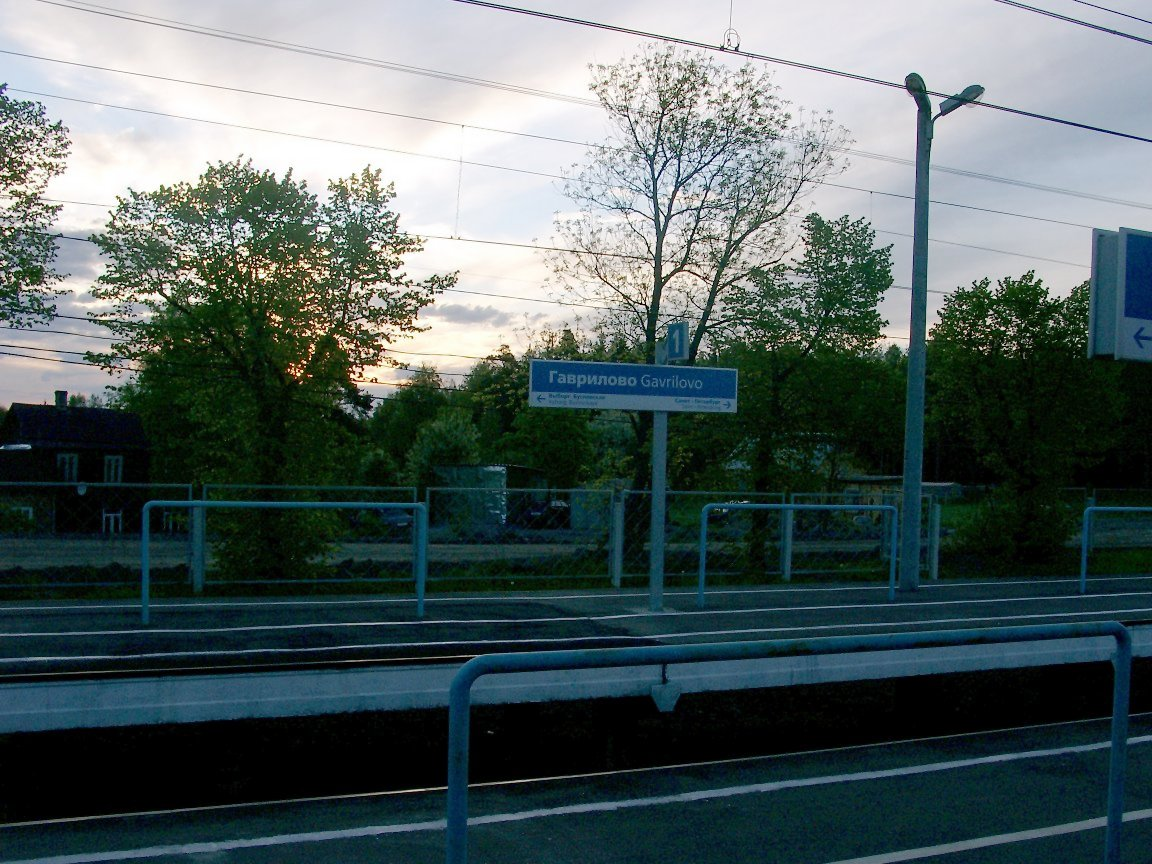
Platform in the Gavrilovo station

Gavrilovo (Russian: Гаврилово, Finnish: Kämärä) is a rural locality in Vyborgsky District of Leningrad Oblast, Russia and a station of the Saint Petersburg-Vyborg railroad. It is located 108 kilometres northwest of Saint Petersburg and 22 kilometres from Vyborg.

== History ==
The village was born after 1881 when the railway station was opened. During the Finnish period, it was a part of the municipality of Kuolemajärvi, Viipuri Province.

The village, which was originally named Kämärä, was the site of the Battle of Kämärä, the first battle of the Finnish Civil War on 27 January 1918. Kämärä became a part of the Soviet Union after World War II. It was renamed Gavrilovo in 1948 .
