= Murder Friday =

1714 massacre during the Great Northern War

The Murder Friday (Finnish: Murhaperjantai) of 29 September 1714 was a massacre in the island of Hailuoto (Karlö), Finland, then part of the Kingdom of Sweden. It was the deadliest single act of Russian terrorism against the civilian population of occupied Finland during the Great Wrath, which was part of the Great Northern War (1713–1721). On that Friday, about 200 Don Cossacks killed almost all the civilians who had fled to the island from the Russian troops. The civilians had fled to the island mainly from the towns of Nykarleby, Jakobstad, Kokkola and Raahe, as well as from coastal areas. Their intention was to escape the Russians to Sweden. According to tradition, there were about 800 victims; also, according to same tradition, the bells of Hailuoto Church were drowned in Lake Kirkonjärvi, where they were never found again.

The massacre began when a few galley-mounted Don Cossacks spotted numerous boats on the island's shore, which led them to land. The massacre was carried out with swords and axes. The people who had fled to the island were sleeping crammed into boats and houses when the bloodbath began. The Russians murdered almost all the men and most of the children. Only one house with men was spared to dig graves for the dead. At the time, there were about 300 official residents in Hailuoto, meaning most of the victims were forced refugees. The Cossacks looted all valuables and the children who were in the best condition. The boats of the refugees were burned. The women who had been left on the island managed to escape to the Västerbotten after the Gulf of Bothnia froze.

The Russians repeated the bloody attack in early January 1715 and again after that. As a result of these events, the island of Hailuoto became an uninhabited wilderness for years.

== See also ==
- Great Wrath
- List of massacres in Finland

== Sources ==
=== Further reading ===
- Rauhut, Claudia; Zeuske, Michael; Conermann, Stephan; Schmieder, Ulrike (2023). Cultural Heritage and Slavery: Perspectives from Europe. De Gruyter. p. 237. ISBN 9783111331492.
