= Vozrozhdeniye, Leningrad Oblast =

Rural locality in Vyborgsky District, Russia

Coordinates: 60.861936°N 28.962024°E

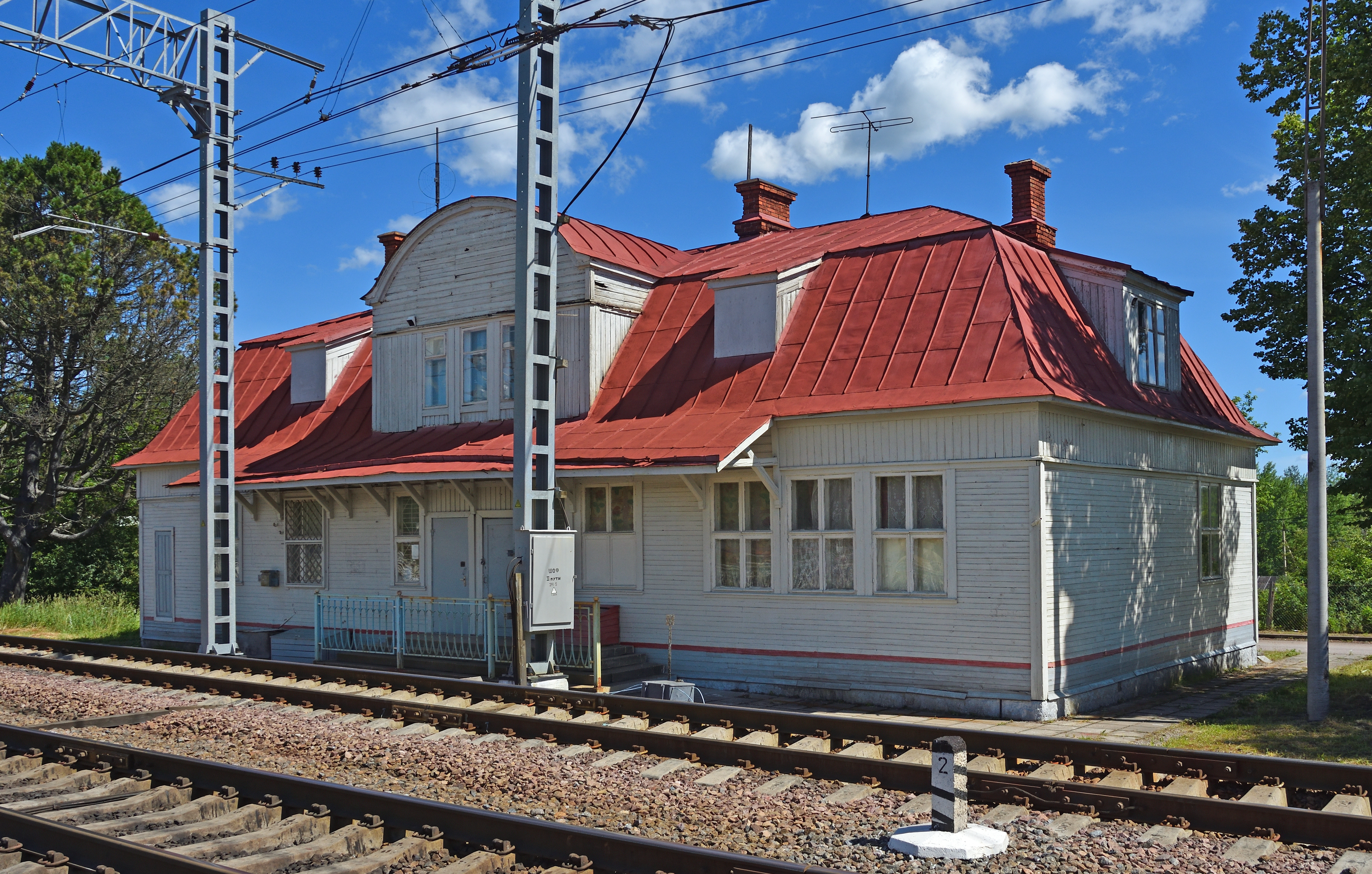

Vozrozhdeniye (Russian: Возрождение, Finnish: Kavantsaari, Swedish: Kavantholm) is a rural locality and a railway station in Kamennogorsk, Vyborgsky District of Leningrad Oblast, Russia. It is located by the Vyborg–Joensuu railroad 23 kilometres north of Vyborg. The railway station was opened in 1892.

It was known by the Finnish name Kavantsaari until 1948, when it was renamed Vozrozhdeniye (lit. 'rebirth') after a nearby sovkhoz.

== Kavantholm Manor ==
Kavantholm was a manor house with a history dating back to the 16th century. It was first owned by Måns Nilsson till Ahtis, the vogt of the Vyborg Castle. In 1562 the king Eric XIV of Sweden granted to manor it to the stadtholder Bertil Göransson Mjöhund. Later in the 16th and 17th centuries it was owned by the noble families of Stubbe, Skalm and Taube and since 1658 by Henrik von Rehbinder. After Rehbinder's death in 1680, the manor was returned to the Crown. As the Old Finland was ceded to Russia in 1721, Kavantholm was granted to the captain Ivan Menshoi Shuvalov. After his son Ivan Shuvalov died in 1797, Kavantholm was sold to the Russian merchant Alexandr Olhin and after his death in 1815 to the count Carl Gustaf Mannerheim. In 1848 Mannerheim sold the manor to the general major Alexander Adam Thesleff. The last owner was his grandson Nikolai Julius Thesleff.

In the 1918 Finnish Civil War Battle of Antrea, Kavantholm served as the Red Guards headquarters. During the World War II, the staff of the Finnish Army IV Corps was housed in Kavantholm. The manor was destroyed in the Soviet Vyborg–Petrozavodsk Offensive in 1944.
