= Jagdstaffel 69 =

Jasta 69
- Active: 1918
- Country: Kingdom of Prussia, German Empire
- Branch: Luftstreitkräfte
- Type: Fighter squadron
- Engagements: World War I

Royal Prussian Jagdstaffel 69, commonly abbreviated to Jasta 69, was a "hunting group" (i.e., fighter squadron) of the Luftstreitkräfte, the air arm of the Imperial German Army during World War I. The squadron would score 15 aerial victories during the war, including two observation balloons downed. The unit's victories came at the expense of one pilot killed in action, three killed in flying accidents, one wounded in action, and three taken prisoner of war.

== History ==
On 1 February 1918, Jasta 69 was founded at Fliegerersatz-Abteilung ("Replacement Detachment") Posen. It became operational on 10 February. About 21 February 1918, the new squadron was posted to 18 Armee. Jasta 69's first aerial victory came on 23 March 1918. On 7 July 1918, the Jasta was transferred to 1 Armee. On 20 August 1918, Jasta 69 was assigned to Armee-Abteilung B. The squadron served out the war.

== Commanding officers (Staffelführer) ==
- Wilhelm Schwartz: ca 1 February 1918 – 1 May 1918
- Alex Thomas: 1 May 1918 – 15 July 1918
- Robert Hildebrand: 15 July 1918 – 24 August 1918
- Alex Thomas: 6 September 1918 – war's end

== Duty stations ==
- Guise, France: ca 21 February 1918
- Origny-Sainte-Benoite, France: 8 March 1918
- Villeselve, France
- Ercheu, France: 7 April 1918
- Balatre, France: 19 May 1918
- Alincourt, France: 7 July 1918
- Habsheim, France: 20 August 1918
- Sierenz: 26 August 1918
- Habsheim: 18 September 1918
