= Lipovka, Leningrad Oblast =

Rural locality in Vyborgsky District, Russia

Coordinates: 60.919391°N 28.973182°E

Lipovka (Russian: Липовка, Finnish: Hannila) is a rural locality and a railway station in Kamennogorsk, Vyborgsky District of Leningrad Oblast, Russia. It is located by the Vyborg-Joensuu railroad 30 kilometres north of Vyborg. The railway station was opened in 1892 for transporting timber. It is still known with the old Finnish name Hannila (Ха́ннила).

Hannila was one of the sites of the 1918 Finnish Civil War Battle of Antrea.
