= Battle of Varkaus =

1918 battle of the Finnish Civil War

Coordinates: 62°19′00″N 27°53′35″E

- Part of the Finnish Civil War
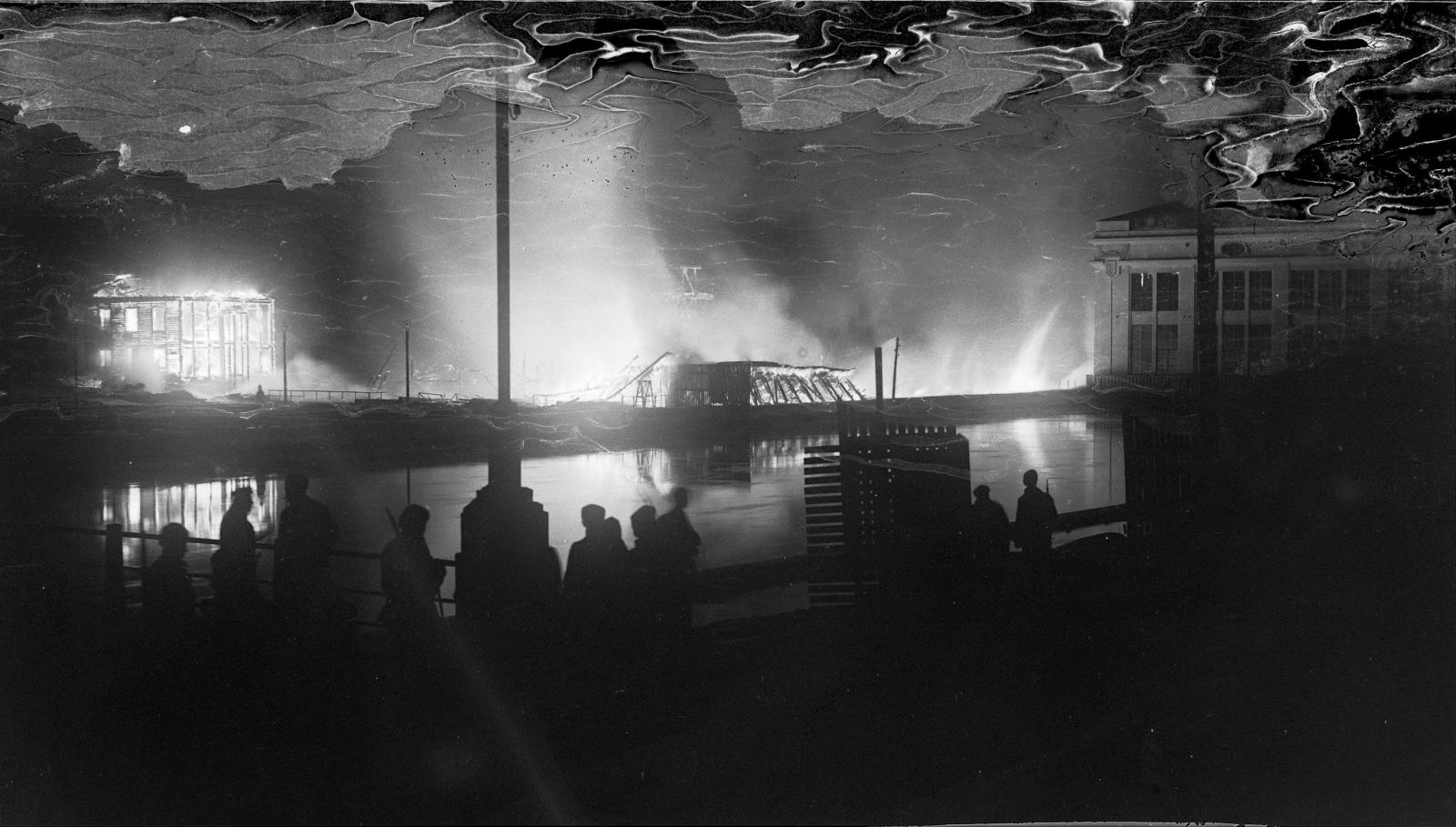
- A. Ahlström Ltd. sawmill on fire
Date	19–21 February 1918 (2 days)
Location	Varkaus, Finland
Result	White victory

Belligerents
Finnish Whites	Finnish Reds

Commanders and leaders
Ernst Löfström; C. W. Malm; Johan Sainio; Karl Müller	Matti Autio (executed); Adam Krogerus (executed); Emil Parkkinen (executed); Kaarlo Lähteenmäki (executed)

Strength
c. 1,000	c. 1,200 (150 armed)

Casualties and losses
12 killed	c. 20 killed 180+ executed

Battle of Varkaus was a battle of the 1918 Finnish Civil War, fought 19–21 February between the Finnish Whites and the Finnish Reds in Varkaus, Leppävirta. The victory was important for the Whites, giving them control of all of Northern Finland. The battle is best known for the bloody Lottery of Huruslahti held afterwards, where the Whites executed up to 180 Reds who had surrendered.

== Background ==
Varkaus was an industrial community of 3,000 people in the Leppävirta municipality of Kuopio Province. The local Red Guard was established in the autumn of 1917. During the days of the November general strike, the guard took Varkaus under its control. As the Civil War broke out in late January 1918, the frontline soon formed in the southern part of Finland and Varkaus became the last remaining Red spot behind the White lines. The Whites made their first attempt to take Varkaus on 6 February but the Reds managed to hit them back. The short encounter ended up with three killed Whites and one dead Red fighter.

== Battle in Varkaus ==
On 18 February, the local White Army staff met in Pieksämäki where they made final plans for the coming second attack. The White unit was composed of 1,000 men from the Savonia, Kymenlaakso and Ostrobothnia regions. It was commanded by the general Ernst Löfström with the junior officers C. W. Malm and Johan Sainio and the Austrian corporal Karl Müller as his subcommanders. The corporal Müller was a fraudster who had enlisted the White Army claiming to be the German lieutenant Karl von Zedtwitz zu Hackenbach. In reality, he was a corporal of the German infantry who had been a prisoner of war in Russia. On his way back home, Müller decided to join the Finnish Whites with a false identity.

The Varkaus Reds were strengthened by men from the nearby areas. Their total strength was about 1,200 but only 150 were armed. The lack of weaponry was a major problem for the Reds throughout the country. The Varkaus Reds even had a ″home made″ cannon, which was manufactured in the local metal works by men who had previously worked at the Putilov Gun Plant in Saint Petersburg. The Varkaus Red Guard was led by the newspaperman Matti Autio who had come to town as an agitator during the 1917 General Strike.

The Whites launched their operation in the late evening of 19 February and surrounded the town by the next morning. The final attack started on 20 February. A day after, the outnumbered Reds withdrew to the Ahlström industrial area in the Päiviönsaari island. Their last shelter was the pulp mill where 700 Red Guard members barricaded themselves in the evening of 21 February. As the Reds ran out of ammunition, they surrendered at 10:00 pm. During the two days of the battle, 12 Whites and at least 20 Reds were killed.

== Aftermath ==
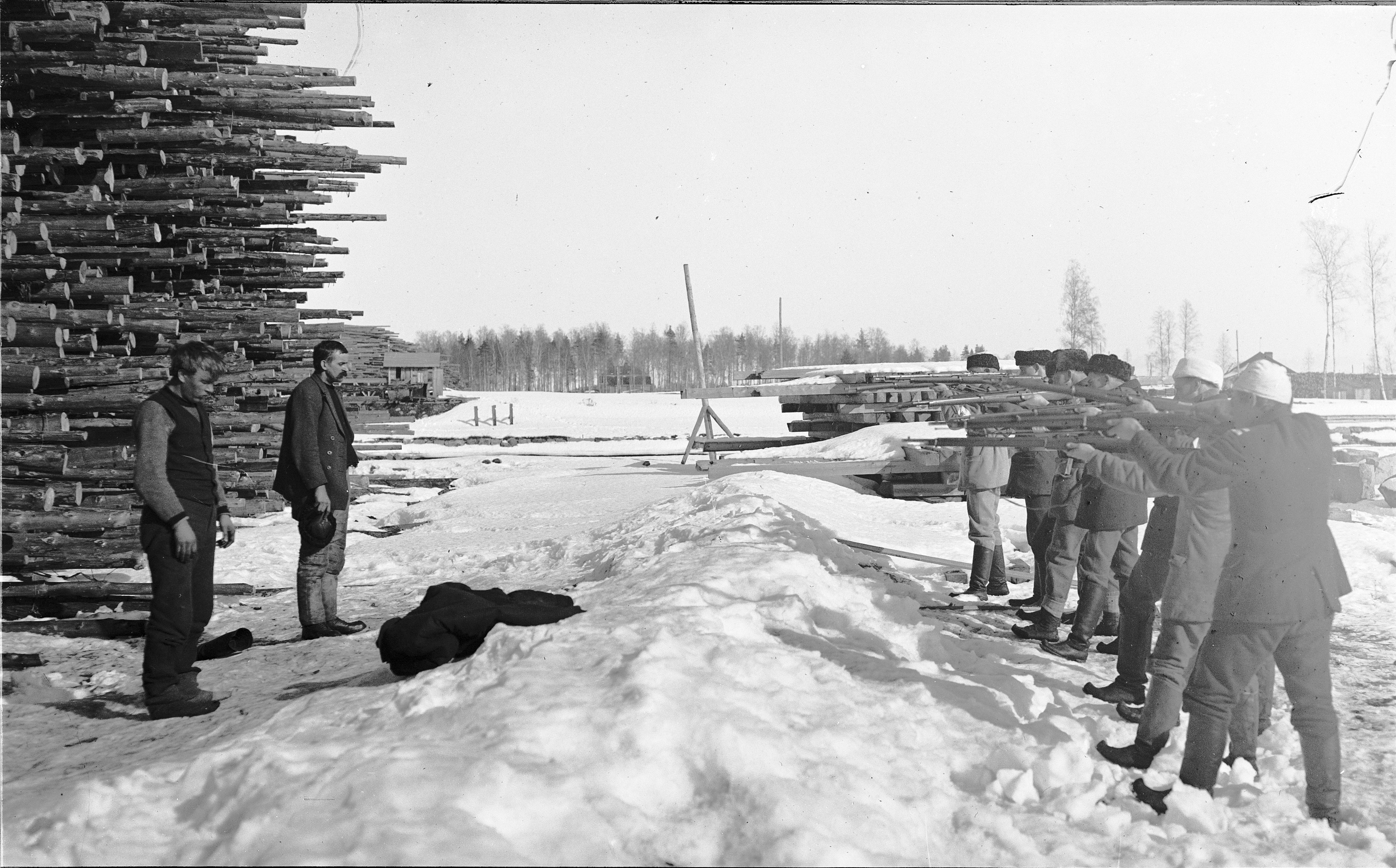
The execution of two Varkaus Reds

The Whites started shooting the surrendered Reds right after their capitulation. According to the eyewitnesses, victims were picked randomly amongst the men exiting the factory. They were then taken to the ice of the nearby Huruslahti Bay and shot. The first to be executed were the Varkaus Red Guard commander Matti Autio and the leaders of the Leppävirta, Lehtoniemi and Savonlinna guards Kaarlo Lähteenmäki, Adam Krogerus and Emil Parkkinen. In the next couple of hours, up to 80 Red Guard members were shot.

The mass execution was soon called the "Lottery of Huruslahti" as the victims seemed to have been selected randomly. Some witnesses said every tenth man was picked, some claiming every seventh. Although, the later studies have shown that the executed were actually not picked randomly they were mostly Red Guard or trade union activists. The White commander C. G. E. Mannerheim had learned the manner on his years in the Russian Army. The idea was to suppress the military revolts by killing the leaders but letting the ordinaries live. Now he presumably used the tactic against the Finnish Reds.

The immediate executions were stopped overnight but a court-martial was soon established. It was led by the local farmer and lawyer Elias Sopanen who later in the 1920s became the Minister of Justice of Finland. Between 22 February and 14 March the court handled cases of 1,254 Reds, 87 were given the death penalty. Dozens of more Reds were shot as the Whites started cleansing the surrounding Leppävirta municipality. The total number of executed Reds in Varkaus and Leppävirta was nearly 180. One hundred more died in the prison camps during the next few months.
