= Ernst Löfström =

Finnish General of the Infantry

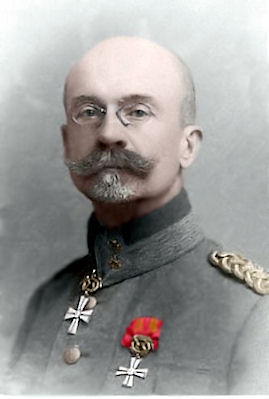
- Born: 31 May 1865; Viipurin maalaiskunta, Russian Empire (now Russian Federation)
- Died: 5 January 1937 (aged 71); Helsinki, Finland
- Military career
- Allegiance: Russian Empire (1883–1917); Finland (1918–1928)
- Branch: Imperial Russian Army; White Guard; Finnish Army
- Service years: 1883–1928
- Rank: Lieutenant General
- Conflicts: First World War; Finnish Civil War

Ernst Löfström (31 May 1865 – 5 January 1937) was a Finnish general in World War I and the Finnish Civil War. He fought on the side of the whites. He died in Helsinki.
