= Shoot on the Spot Declaration =

Finnish decree

The Shoot on the Spot Declaration (Finnish: Ammutaan paikalla -julistus) was a statement issued by Carl Gustaf Emil Mannerheim, the military leader of White Finland, on 25 February 1918, in the early stages of the Finnish Civil War. The Declaration was adopted as a rule of engagement of the White troops. Among other things, it directed troops on the treatment of prisoners and gave commanders of units wide powers to carry out executions at their sole discretion.

Already at its inception, its legality was highly questionable, because a death sentence for treason was not legal unless a state of war was declared. The Senate (the Whites' government) did not want to do so because the only applicable law would have been the hated Tsarist Russia martial law, which would also transfer emergency powers to the army. It preferred to consider those who fought for Red Finland as "armed civilians". The army favoured a declaration of war to treat the prisoners as civilians and so execution for treason would become legal. A compromise was reached: an extrajudicial execution of a "saboteur caught red-handed" or "quarter at discretion" should be considered a justifiable homicide committed in defence of life or property. In practice, battlefield commanders decided which Red prisoners would be released, detained or considered dangerous and summarily executed. For example, known "murderers" or "arsonists" were shot at the sole discretion of the commander. That policy made it difficult to distinguish whether deaths "in battle" actually occurred in combat or were summary executions after the fact.

The mass execution known as "Lottery of Huruslahti", an alleged decimation, was the defining moment. Summary executions then became common. Military tribunals were initially established, but interrogators could generally freely decide on the fate of the prisoners. On 25 February 1918, Mannerheim promulgated a decree to dismiss the tribunals. However, that had little effect because the battlefield commanders exercised their discretion largely independently far into the spring. Summary executions continued throughout 1918 even after the conclusion of the war, particularly in prison camps.

As Soviet military advisors fought for the Reds, the Whites assumed that any ethnic Russians captured would be hostile, which stoked ethnic hatred. Thus, any Russians captured fighting along with the Reds, civilian or military, were typically summarily executed. This included 200 Russian civilians executed in the aftermath of the Battle of Viipuri, and even one White officer of Polish origin in the Battle of Tampere.

Regardless of its legality, the possible guilt of the accused became a moot point after the war, when amnesty laws were passed.
