= Cherkasovo =

Cherkasovo Черкасово
- Village
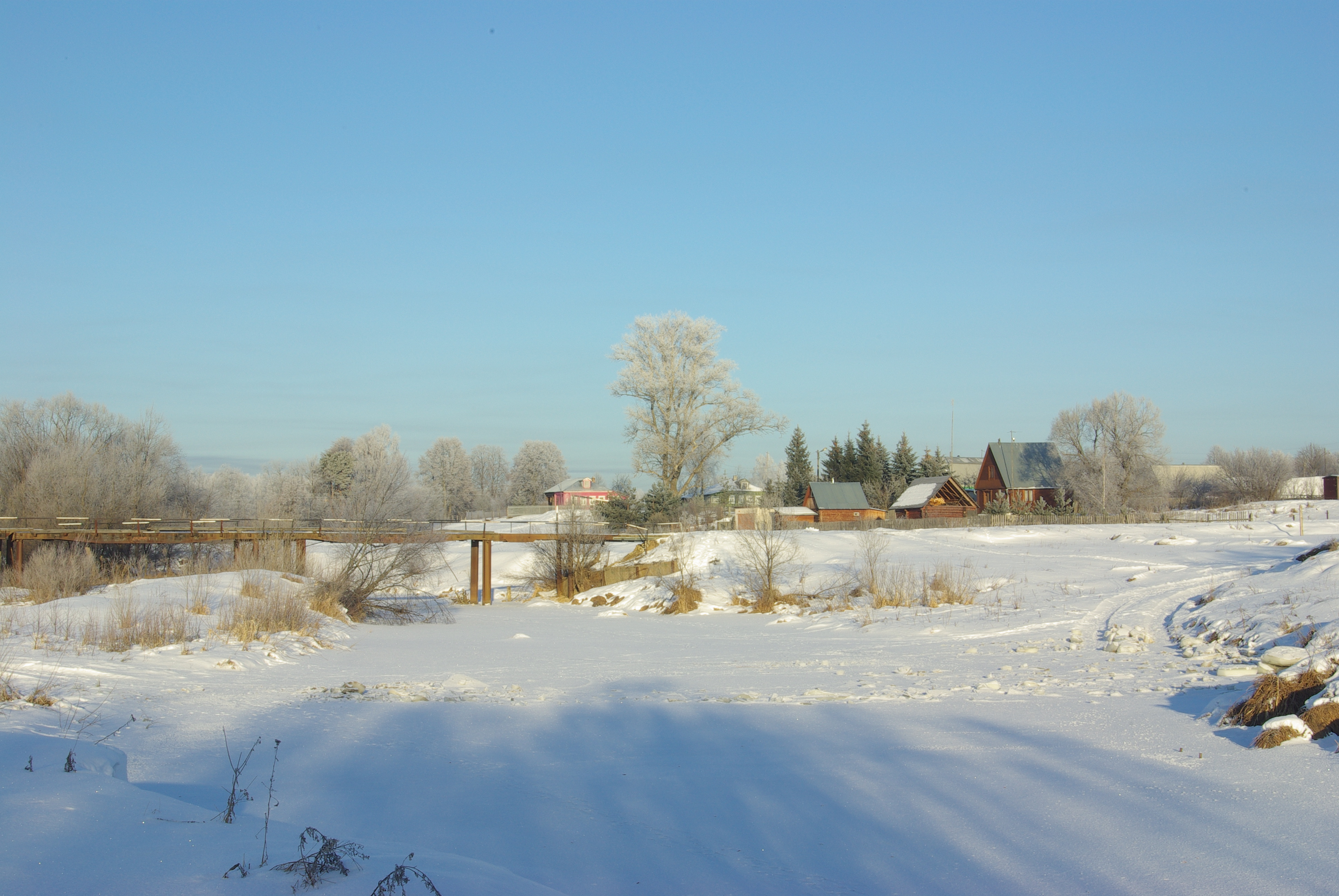

- Location within Vladimir Oblast Location within Russia
- Coordinates: 55°59′N 39°41′E
- Country: Russia
- Region: Vladimir Oblast
- District: Petushinsky District
- Time zone: UTC+3:00

Cherkasovo (Russian: Черкасово) is a rural locality (a village) in Pekshinskoye Rural Settlement, Petushinsky District, Vladimir Oblast, Russia. The population was 37 as of 2010.

== Geography ==
Cherkasovo is located on the left bank of the Peksha River, 23 km northeast of Petushki (the district's administrative centre) by road. Peksha is the nearest rural locality.
