= Jagdstaffel 71 =

Jasta 71
- Active: 1918
- Country: Kingdom of Prussia, German Empire
- Branch: Luftstreitkräfte
- Type: Fighter squadron
- Engagements: World War I

Royal Prussian Jagdstaffel 71, commonly abbreviated to Jasta 71, was a "hunting group" (i.e., fighter squadron) of the Luftstreitkräfte, the air arm of the Imperial German Army during World War I. The squadron would score eight aerial victories during the war, including three observation balloons downed. The unit's victories came at the expense of four killed in action and one wounded in action.

== History ==
Jasta 71 was founded on 6 February 1918, at Fliegerersatz-Abteilung ("Replacement Detachment") 13, Bromberg. The new squadron went operational on 17 February. Four days later, it was assigned to Armee-Abteilung B. Jasta 71 scored its first aerial victory on 9 May 1918. The squadron served through war's end.

== Commanding officers (Staffelführer) ==
- Hermann Stutz

== Duty stations ==
- Colmar South: 21 February 1918
- Habsheim, France: 27 March 1918
- Sierenz: 3 June 1918
- Habsheim 24 June 1918
