= Pionerskoye =

Rural locality in Vyborgsky District, Russia

Coordinates: 60°22′30″N 28°58′05″E

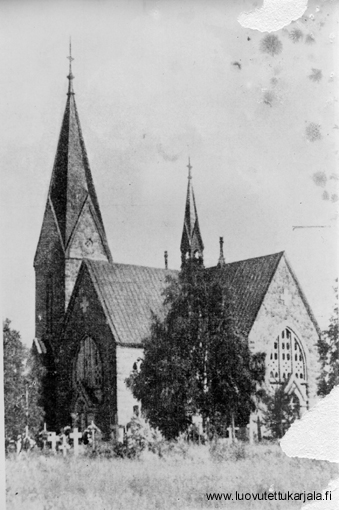
Kuolemajärvi Lutheran Church. Built in 1903, destroyed in 1939

Pionerskoye (Russian: Пионе́рское; Finnish: Kuolemajärvi) is a rural locality on Karelian Isthmus, in Vyborgsky District of Leningrad Oblast, Russia. Until the Winter War and Continuation War, it had been the administrative center of the Kuolemajärvi (lit. Death lake) municipality of the Viipuri province of Finland.
