= Perttula executions =

Execution during the Finnish Civil War

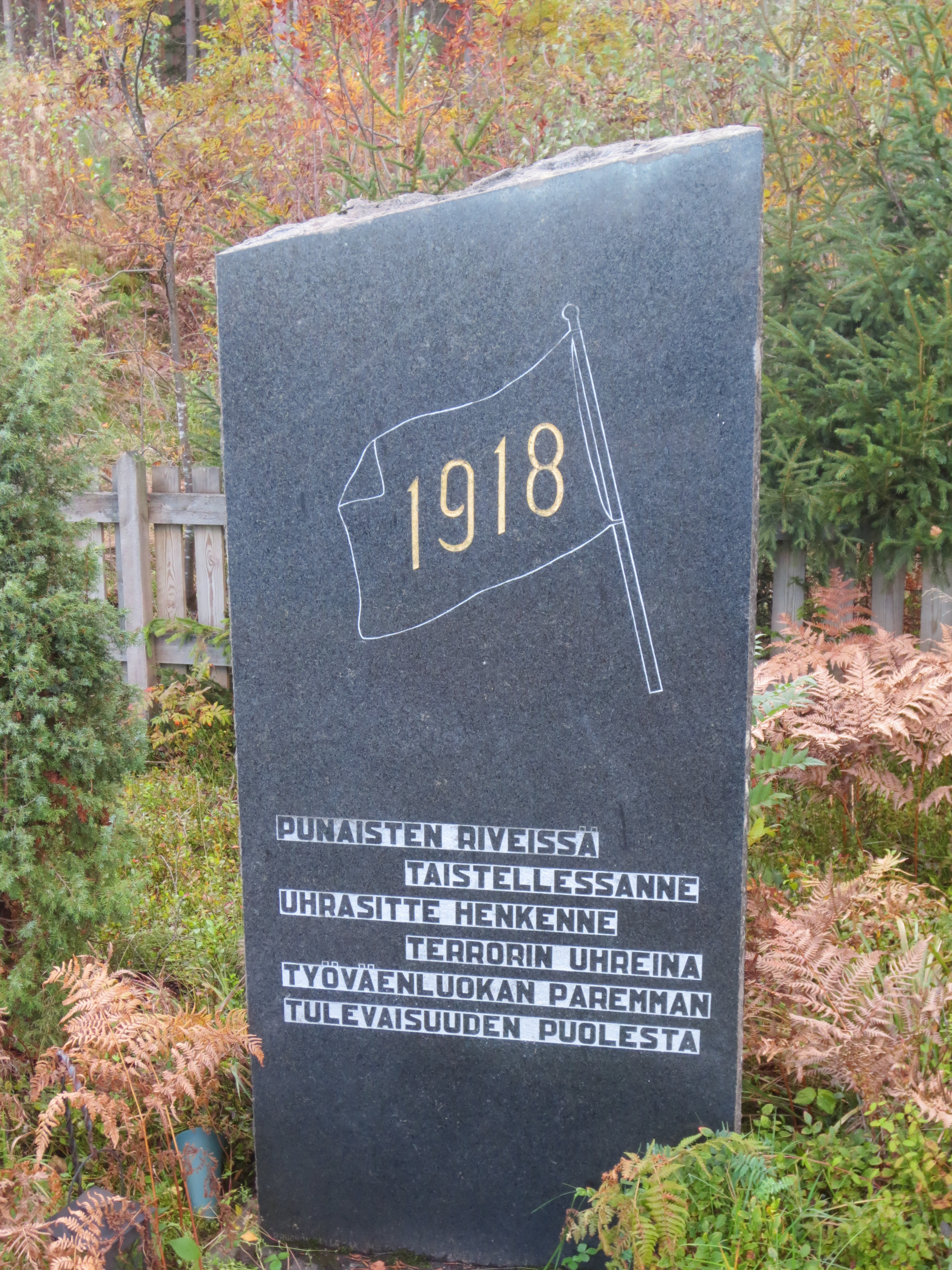
The monument of mass grave of executed reds was erected in 1955.

The Perttula executions, also known as the "Perttula Blood Weddings", took place during the Pentecost between May 18 and May 20, 1918, during the Finnish Civil War, when Finnish Whites shot about 30-40 Finnish Reds or suspected communists. The executions took place in the village of Perttula, Nurmijärvi and were carried out by a battalion of Swedish-speaking Western-Uusimaa partisans of the White Guard. It was led by Swedish Lieutenant-Colonel Edward Ward, with former Russian Army officer Ivar Hast and Chief of Defense Ivar Ståhle as the company commanders.

The exact number of executions in Perttula is unknown, but the number of victims is estimated at 29-37. The youngest victim was only 16 years old and there were women among the executed.

== See also ==
- Finnish Civil War
