= Jukka Rahja =

Finnish politician (1887–1920)

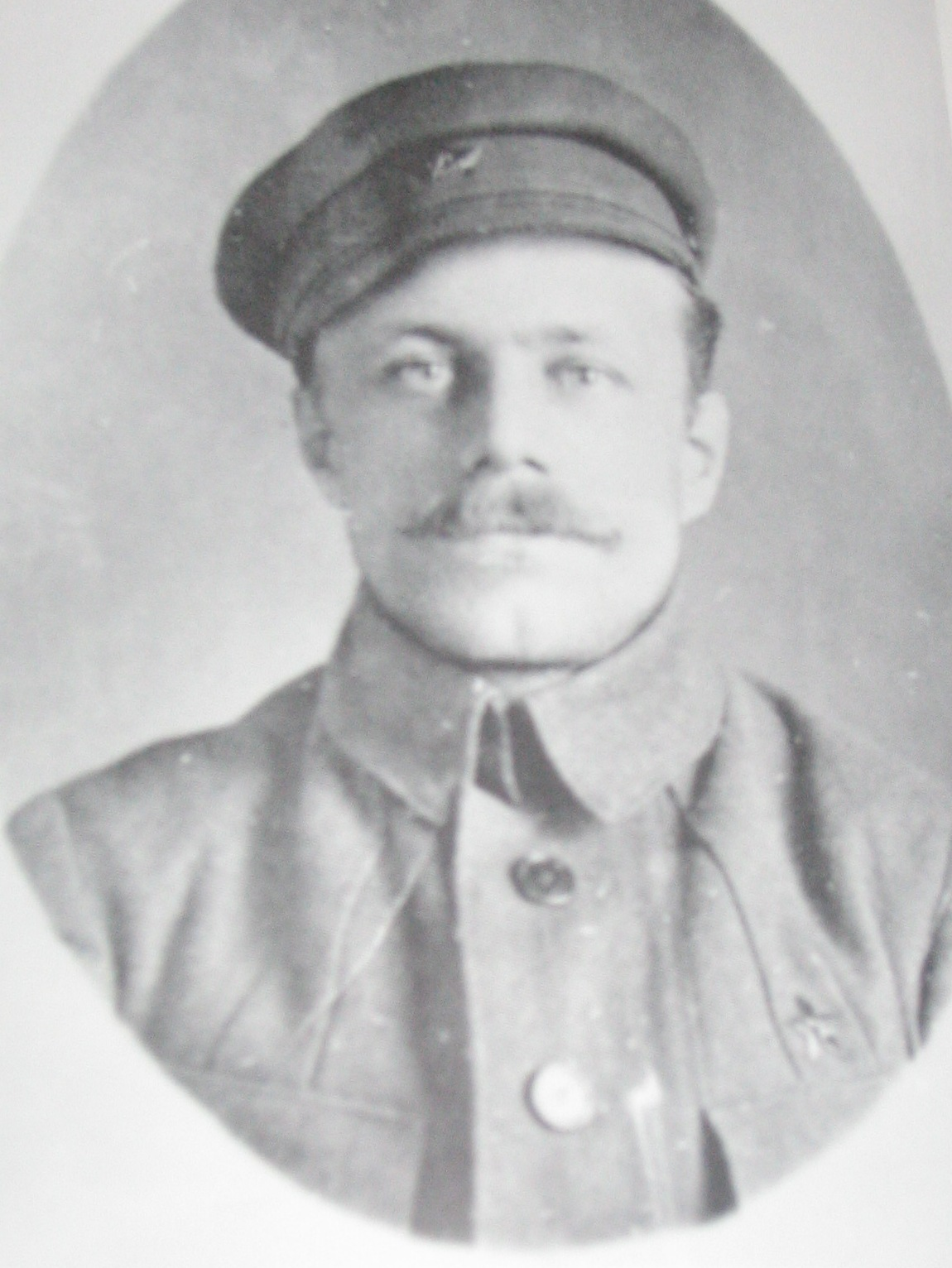
Jukka Rahja

Jukka Rahja (1887 – 31 August 1920) was a Russian and Finnish Bolshevik. He was killed by the Petrograd Opposition.

Born in Kronstadt, Russian Empire, Jukka was the brother of Eino Rahja and Jaakko Rahja. Their father was a Finnish dockworker, Aappo Rahja.

He joined the Russian Social Democratic Labour Party in 1903. He was also active in the Finnish labour youth movement. He was active in the 1905 Revolution working as part of the Bolshevik faction in Kronstadt. Following the defeat of the revolution, he fled to Kuopio, Finland and became active in the socialist movement there. In 1913 he returned to St Petersburg, and went on to become active amongst the Petrograd Bolsheviks. After the October Revolution he was sent to Finland to organise the Red Guards. As the Finnish Civil War begun, Rahja was wounded in the Battle of Kämärä and was hospitalized until the end of war in May 1918. Following the defeat, Rahja fled to the Russian SFSR and became a founding member of the Finnish Communist Party (SKP). He was a delegate for the SKP and the First and Second congresses of the Third International.

On 31 August 1920, during the Kuusinen Club Incident in Petrograd, Rahja was murdered by the Petrograd Opposition, a faction within the SKP. This so-called "revolver opposition" consisted mainly of students of the Petrograd Red Officer School.

The word "Rahjaism" was used to describe the politics of the brothers, who were usually in conflict with their comrades and attracted many enemies. The Rahjas were involved in smuggling, black-marketing, horse-trading and counterfeiting, for example, and they were accused of corruption, an extravagant life and drunkenness in the SKP.
