= Harmoinen sick room mass murder =

Incident in the Finnish Civil War, 1918

The Harmoinen sick room mass murder was a significant incident in the Harmoinen village of the Kuhmoinen Parish that took place on 10 March 1918, during the Finnish Civil War, which according to the Reds met the criteria for a massacre. It took place during the Battle of Kuhmoinen, when the Whites executed 11 Red Guard patients and two male sanitaries. The Whites belonged to the 1st company and its battalion commanded by the Estonian-born Hans Kalm. Kalm was not part of the incident and did not know anything about it, as he was engaged in the defense of the Kuhmoinen parish center at the time, against the Red Guards offensive in the direction of Jämsä. These claims are based on the stories by two survivors, reports by the Whites and other materials. Researcher of political history Jaakko Paavolainen thinks that "it is possible that shots were fired from the sick room, as the Whites have reported, but the claim that the snipers would have retired to the beds inside, is a rather fantastic one."

== The starting point ==
The Battle of Kuhmoinen was at its height on 10 March. The area was in the eastern protection zone of Tampere (and a former rebellion center during the Cudgel War). The Reds were trying to occupy the parish center, but the attempt came to naught in the end. In the southern extremity of the parish, in the Harmoinen village, the local sick room was used as a hospital for the Reds, and it was claimed it worked under a "leftist Red Cross". The "leftist Red Cross" in this story is a completely unknown one, and such a term is not found in any other connection with respect to the Finnish Civil War.

The Reds had originally considered seeking help from the Red Cross, but in the end they had decided against it, and they founded their own organization, which was not dependent on the medical doctors of the bourgeoisie. On 8 November 1917, a medical organ named Ensi-Avun Osasto (‘First Aid Department’) had been founded for the Working Class Guards, but its activities proved to be rather insignificant.

On 5 February 1918, the Finnish Red Guards general staff had its meeting in which its organization was agreed upon. The meeting founded an ambulatory (i.e. medical) department, and F. A. Hyrsky was appointed as its head. In financial and organizational matters, it was subjected to the Red Guards supervisory board, and on 22 February 1918, on the orders of Commander in Chief Eero Haapalainen, it was transferred to the authority of the general staff.

A kind of a competition existed between the Red Guards First Aid Unit and the Red Cross. The First Aid Unit wanted to be independent of the Red Cross and of Finnish medical doctors, although in Lahti they were not successful in this. According to Rosén, the wounded and sick members of the Red Guards — including Russians — strove to become treated by the Red Cross doctors and hospitals, preferring them to Red Guards first aid units. The relations between the First Aid Units and the Red Cross suffered from the murder of Candidate of Medicine Gösta Schybergson in early February, 1918. Commander-in-Chief Haapalainen published on 31 January a communiqué to the Red Guards, stating that the Red Cross had promised to remain neutral between the two parties of the war and to treat the wounded of both sides, but various kinds of incidents nevertheless took place.

In the beginning of the war the Red Guards took the view that the wounded of both parties should be treated in the same way. Although the Red Guards were in many places, e.g. in the central front, sympathetic to the Red Cross, the leaders of the Red Guards units that fought in Harmoinen, i.e. the Lahti Red Guard Regiment, remained unequivocally negative in their attitudes towards the Red Cross. The activities of the Lahti section of the Finnish Red Cross were in trouble right from the beginning, when it was not possible to reach an agreement on cooperation between the Red Cross doctors and the Red Guards First Aid Unit.

== The events ==
The 1st Company of the Kalm Battalion was engaged in a swing into the rear of the Kuhmoinen Reds, and some of their troops made a surprise attack against Kuhmoinen village and the Reds had to retreat from there. 13 wounded men and a few sanitaries were left behind in the sick room. Around 5 p.m., a detachment of White soldiers arrived, led by secondary school graduate Artturi Paimela, accompanied by Sergeant Major of the 1st Company, Master of Arts Albert Gyllenbögel. The executions were conducted immediately. According to a survivor, the executioners told those to be executed to "prepare for hell, because you will meet your deaths in 5 minutes!" The sanitaries, who had tried to hide but had been found, were taken to the courtyard, and the men were shot. The patients were shot one by one in their beds. Also two of the women found in the sick room are said to have been executed. Two were spared on the grounds that they could speak the Swedish language.

One of the two survivors got two bullets, one in the neck and one in the chin. He played dead and threw himself on the floor and later fled through a window and went to a near-by barn, where he found laundry hanging, and used it to bandage his wounds. Another survivor, K. Nuutila, was lying in the farthest bed. He was shot in the face, which he tried to shield with his hand, and he lost consciousness and only came to several days later. During the events he did come to for a while, and he could see that others, lying in their beds half dead, were being executed. He covered himself with a sheet, but it was torn away; however it seems that the dried blood on his face made him look like he was already dead. Nuutila was able to escape, and some local people helped him to reach Padasjoki. One patient, who groaned in agony, was spared, because the attackers thought that he would die later anyway. He had earlier been shot in the head.

== The events after the skirmish ==
The White company left the village the following day, and it seems that many outsiders went to the sick room and saw what had happened. The Whites came to the village again two days after the skirmish. Only two weeks later, the locals were given the order to bury the victims, on pain of being put in front of a firing squad. The locals were faced with the problem that there were only 11 bodies, but they found two bodies at the roadside, and thus the number of 13 was met. Were the two bodies those of the sanitaries is not known. The bodies were buried in a field that belonged to a family named Nikula.

According to Jaakko Paavolainen, the report written later by the Whites seems not credible. The report was written by Sergeant Major Albert Gyllenbögel of the 1st Company for the memorial book of the Kalm Battalion.

The reports says that shots were fired from the sick room and that when the Whites arrived there, they found healthy, armed men in the hospital beds, and they were given their sentences without further ado. Paavolainen surmises, that "it is possible that shots were fired from the direction of the hospital, but the claim that snipers had retreated to the hospital beds is a rather fantastic one." The Red press made use of the incident in its propaganda.

== Observations from Sweden ==
The incident was noticed in Sweden, and Secretary of State Samuli Sario telegraphed to the chief of staff and asked for a report in hopes that "we could inform a Swedish cabinet minister, who had asked about information on the incident, and tell him that the news regarding it were without base." No such report to a Swedish minister can be found in the Finnish archives.

== Sources ==
- Paavolainen, Jaakko (1967). Poliittiset väkivaltaisuudet Suomessa 1918, 2 Valkoinen terrori ['Political violence in Finland in 1918, volume: White terror'].
- Ylikangas, Heikki (1993). Tie Tampereelle ['The road to Tampere']. Helsinki: WSOY. p. 569. ISBN 951-0-18897-2.
