= Jagdstaffel 70 =

Jasta 70
- Active: 1918
- Country: Kingdom of Prussia, German Empire
- Branch: Luftstreitkräfte
- Type: Fighter squadron
- Engagements: World War I

Royal Prussian Jagdstaffel 70, commonly abbreviated to Jasta 70, was a "hunting group" (i.e., fighter squadron) of the Luftstreitkräfte, the air arm of the Imperial German Army during World War I. The squadron would score over 14 aerial victories during the war. The unit's victories came at the expense of two killed in action and three wounded in action.

== History ==
Jasta 70 was founded at Fliegerersatz-Abteilung ("Replacement Detachment") 11, Brieg, on 6 February 1918. The new squadron became operational on 18 February. On 22 February, it was assigned to Armee-Abteilung A. The fighter squadron flew its first combat missions on 25 March 1918. Its first aerial victory came on 2 May 1918. The squadron would serve past war's end, being disbanded 6 December 1918.

== Commanding officers (Staffelführer) ==
- Hans Schlieter

== Duty stations ==
- Buhl, France: 22 February 1918
- Stotzheim, France: 26 August 1918
