= Lottery of Huruslahti =

Finnish massacre

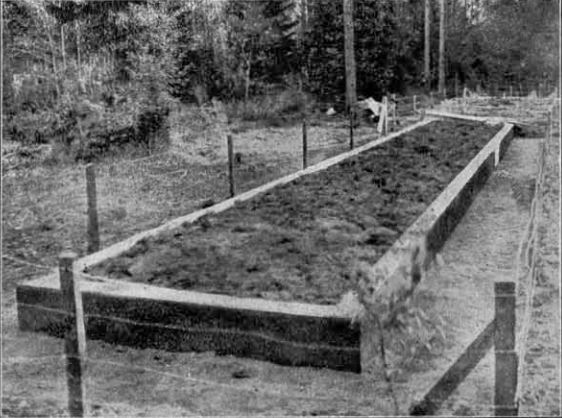
Mass grave of Red soldiers in Varkaus, many of them shot during the lottery. Photo from 1928.

The Lottery of Huruslahti (Finnish: Huruslahden arpajaiset) was a massacre and alleged decimation that occurred in Varkaus, Finland after the Battle of Varkaus in the Finnish Civil War. In it, approximately 90 Red Guard prisoners of war were killed by the White Guards.

It was the first application of the Shoot on the Spot Declaration, which ordered that all Red leaders, agitators, and saboteurs caught red-handed, and whoever had actually participated in violence should be shot without trial, defining this as justifiable homicide rather than a death sentence. The survived Red Guard prisoners claimed that after the Varkaus battle the White Guards ordered all the captured Reds to assemble in a single row on the ice of Huruslahti, selected first all leaders and then every fifth prisoner, and executed them on the spot. The number executed was 10% of the accused. The Whites claimed that they individually selected each victim based on known identities and acts of violence rather than randomly, even though many victims were underage and had not participated in the battle. Furthermore, the condemned were first separated from the rest and then shot in groups of five.

The legality of the event has been debated: in modern terms, it would be considered a war crime. It was apparently embarrassing to the White leadership already at the time: there was no declaration of war, and the apparent legality was based solely on a military order, not on the law as conventionally required. The Senate considered the victims as "armed civilians". Without a particular law to authorize the death penalty, the executions were illegal. However, the newly independent state of Finland had not signed any treaties on the laws of war, such as the Brussels Declaration of 1874 or the Hague Conventions of 1899 and 1907. The general amnesty laws adopted after the war absolved all perpetrators from judicial responsibility.

== See also ==
- History of Finland#Independence and Civil War
