= January 1918 =

Month in 1918

| << | January 1918 | | | | | >> |
| Su | Mo | Tu | We | Th | Fr | Sa |
| | | 1 | 2 | 3 | 4 | 5 |
| 6 | 7 | 8 | 9 | 10 | 11 | 12 |
| 13 | 14 | 15 | 16 | 17 | 18 | 19 |
| 20 | 21 | 22 | 23 | 24 | 25 | 26 |
| 27 | 28 | 29 | 30 | 31 |

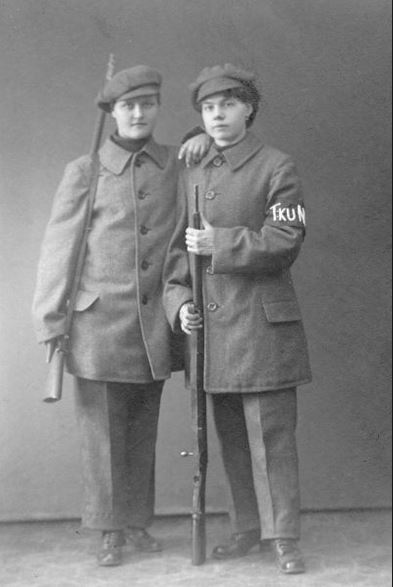
Female Red Guard soldiers during the Finnish Civil War.

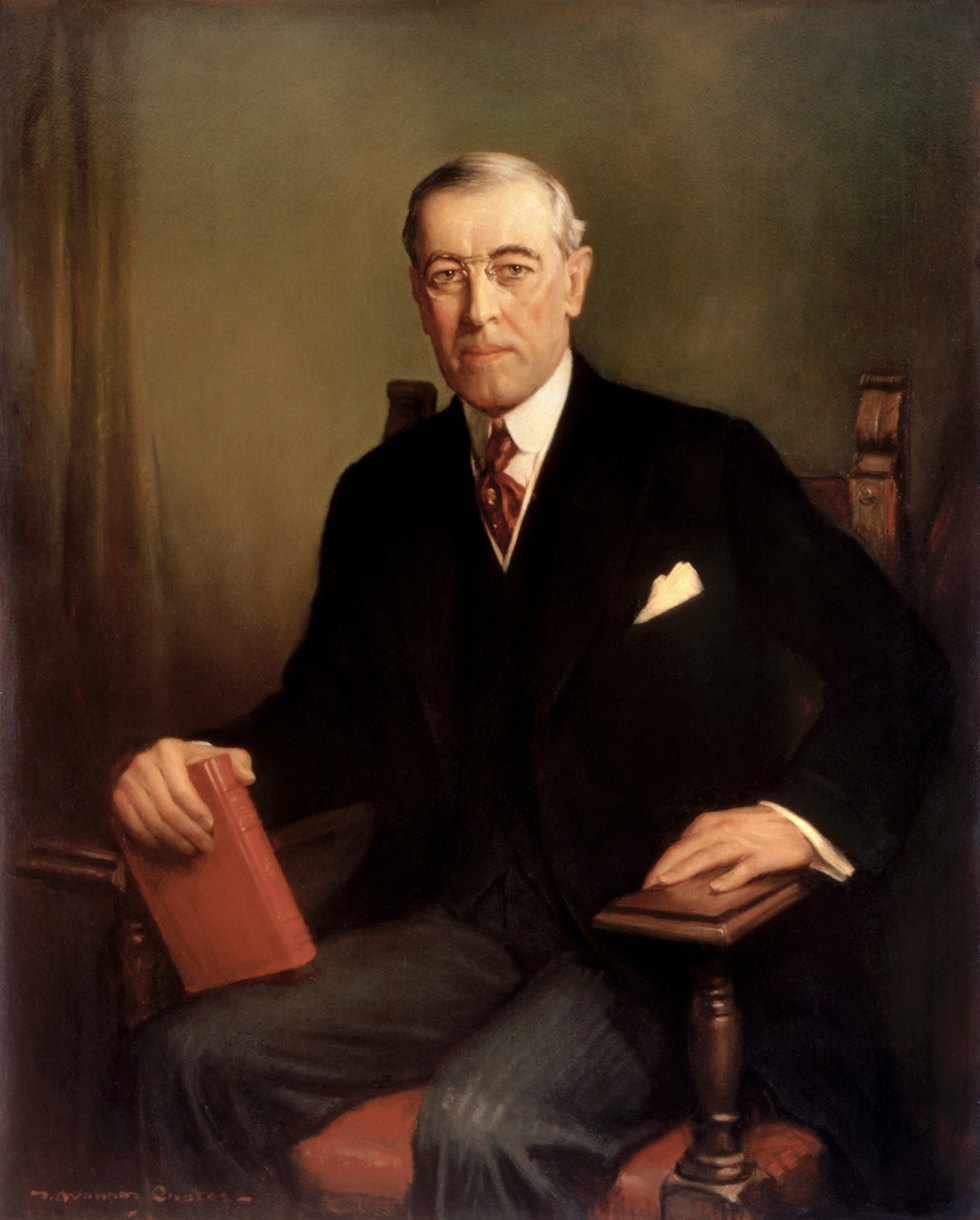
U.S. President Woodrow Wilson delivers his Fourteen Points to achieve peace to U.S. Congress.

The following events occurred in January 1918:

== January 1, 1918 (Tuesday) ==
- The Stavropol Soviet Republic was established around Stavropol, Russia until it eventually merged with North Caucasian Soviet Republic in December.
- The Royal Flying Corps established air squadrons No. 117, No. 120, No. 121, No. 122, and No. 141.
- The Luftstreitkräfte, the air arm of the Imperial German Army, established air squadrons Jagdstaffel 54, 55, and 56.
- The Office of Chief Medical Examiner of the City of New York was established as the replacement for the Coroner of New York City, with Charles Norris as the first chief medical examiner.
- The Mare Island Marines of California beat the Camp Lewis Army from American Lake, Washington 19–7 in the fourth Rose Bowl football game.
- Popular British novelist and wartime propagandist Hall Caine was made an Order of the British Empire.
- The operetta Where the Lark Sings, by Hungarian composer Franz Lehár, premiered at the Royal Opera House in Budapest.
- The Serbian-Croatian literary magazine Literary south released its first edition as a medium to promote Yugoslavism in literary culture.
- Born:
  - Patrick Anthony Porteous, British army officer, commander of the No. 4 Commando unit during World War II, recipient of the Victoria Cross; in Abbottabad, British India (present-day Pakistan) (d. 2000)
  - Jaja Wachuku, Nigerian politician, first Minister of Foreign Affairs of Nigeria from 1961 to 1965; in Nbawsi, Southern Region, British Nigeria (present-day Abia State, Nigeria) (d. 1996)
- Died: William Wilfred Campbell, 57, Canadian poet, known for his poetry collections including Lake Lyrics and Other Poems, member of the Confederation Poets (b. 1860)

== January 2, 1918 (Wednesday) ==
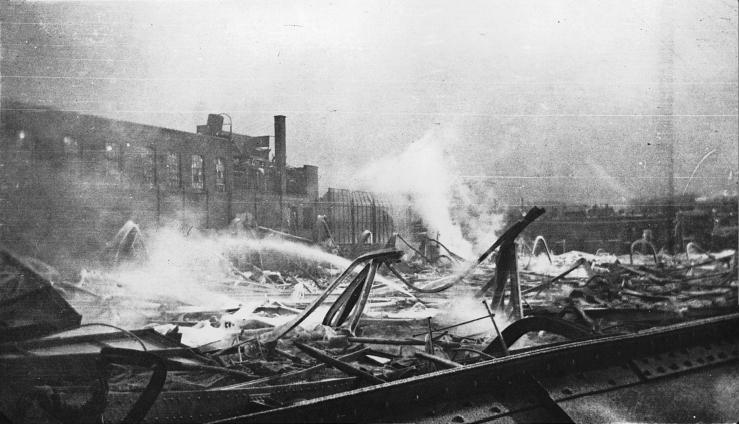
Fire destroys the Montreal Arena.

- The Air Ministry for the Government of the United Kingdom was established with Lord Rothermere appointed as its first minister.
- The hockey team Montreal Wanderers disbanded following the destruction of the Montreal Arena by fire.
- Popular British novelist Marie Corelli was convicted under wartime legislation for hoarding food.
- U.S. President Woodrow Wilson established the Distinguished Service Cross on the recommendation of General John J. Pershing, commander of the American Expeditionary Forces. Pershing suggested Americans serving in World War I should receive an award similar to those cited by European armed forces as opposed to the tradition Medal of Honor usually awarded for heroic action in American military operations. By the end of war, over 6,309 awards were made to 6,185 recipients.
- Died: Katharine A. O'Keeffe O'Mahoney, 62-66, American poet and educator, noted instructor to Robert Frost, author of Famous Irishwomen (b. 1855)

== January 3, 1918 (Thursday) ==
- The Daily Mail published an editorial strongly criticizing the British Army's policy of not disclosing the names of successful Royal Flying Corps pilots unless they were killed, and that naming successful pilots as done in France and Germany would improve public morale.
- The Air Council for the newly established Air Ministry of the United Kingdom was formed.
- The United States Marine Corps established the 11th Marine Regiment as part of the 5th Marine Expeditionary Brigade in France.
- Sri Lankan newspaper baron D. R. Wijewardena founded the English-language newspaper Daily News.
- Died: Edwin Dodgson, 71, English clergy, missionary to Tristan da Cunha in the Atlantic Ocean, youngest brother to Lewis Carroll (b. 1846)

== January 4, 1918 (Friday) ==
- Finland was officially recognized as a sovereign nation by Russia.
- British hospital ship HMHS Rewa was torpedoed and sunk in the Bristol Channel by German submarine SM U-55, killing four people with the rest of the 566 on board rescued.
- The South Indian Railway Company opened a new rail line between Kollam and Thiruvananthapuram, India, including stations for Eravipuram, Mayyanad and Paravur.
- Born: Robert L. Floyd, American politician, 24th (and youngest) Mayor of Miami; in Cincinnati, United States (d. 2007)

== January 5, 1918 (Saturday) ==
- A massive fire caused by a series of explosions destroyed four hangars and five airships at the Imperial German Navy airship base in Tondern, Denmark. Four civilian workers and 10 naval personnel were killed, while another 134 were injured.
- The United States Army established the 8th Infantry Division, known for its nickname "Pathfinder".
- The New York City Subway system added more stations to the BMT Broadway Line, including City Hall, Cortlandt Street, Rector Street, 23rd Street and 28th Street.
- Born:
  - Jack Kramer, American baseball player, pitcher for the St. Louis Browns, Boston Red Sox, New York Giants, and New York Yankees from 1939 to 1951; as John Henry Kramer, in New Orleans, United States (d. 1995)
  - Robert Richardson, American air force pilot, commander of the 4th Fighter Wing during World War II, recipient of the Legion of Merit, Air Medal, and Croix de guerre; in Rockford, Illinois, United States (d. 2011)

== January 6, 1918 (Sunday) ==
- German flying ace Walter von Bülow-Bothkamp was killed when his plane was shot down by Royal Flying Corps aces Frank Granger Quigley and William Mayes Fry during an air battle over Ypres. He had 28 victories to his credit when he died.
- The Luftstreitkräfte established air squadrons Jagdstaffel 57, 58, and 59.
- Died: Georg Cantor, 72, German mathematician, developed set theory for mathematical study (b. 1845)

== January 7, 1918 (Monday) ==
- Responding to public pressure from British newspapers, the British Army published in the Daily Mail "Our Wonderful Airmen – Their Names At Last," the first article identifying living Royal Flying Corps pilots by name. Included in the article were the exploits of British flying aces Philip Fuller and James McCudden.
- The musical Oh, Lady! Lady!!, written by Guy Bolton and P. G. Wodehouse with music by Jerome Kern, premiered in Albany, New York before being revised for Broadway a month later.
- Born: Kevin A. Lynch, American urban planner, author of The Image of the City; in Chicago, United States (d. 1984)
- Died: Julius Wellhausen, 73, German historian, leading expert on biblical and Islamic history, author of Prologue to the History of Israel (b. 1844)

== January 8, 1918 (Tuesday) ==
- Shamkhor massacre – An Azerbaijani unit under orders from the Military Council of Nationalities of the Transcaucasian Democratic Federative Republic moved to engage and disarm a retreating and disorganized Russian army column in the South Caucasus region, meeting up with thousands of Russian troops at a rail line near the village of Shamkhor in what is now Azerbaijan. After Russian soldiers refused to give up their arms, the conflict escalated until shots were fired and the Azerbaijanis stormed the train, killing hundreds before disarming the column and seizing 20 artillery pieces and 70 machine guns.
- Billy Hughes resigned as Prime Minister of Australia as promised following the defeat of the referendum on conscription. He was immediately sworn in again by the Governor-General of Australia as there were no alternative candidates.
- U.S. President Woodrow Wilson delivered his Fourteen Points speech to United States Congress outlining the statement of principles the United States would use in peace negotiations following the end of World War I.
- A group of wineries in Paarl, South Africa formed the Co-operative Winemakers Union' of South Africa, or KWV for its Afrikaner acronym, becoming known for its international brand of wines, spirits, and liqueurs.
- Born: Bruce Kingsbury, Australian soldier, member of the 2/14th Australian Battalion, recipient of the Victoria Cross for action at the Battle of Isurava during World War II; in Melbourne, Australia (d. 1942, killed in action)
- Died: Ellis H. Roberts, 90, American politician, 20th Treasurer of the United States (b. 1827)

== January 9, 1918 (Wednesday) ==
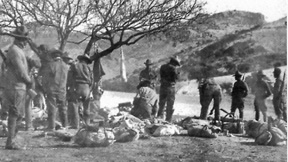
American troops watch over Yaqui prisoners following the Battle of Bear Valley in Arizona.

- An election for 301 deputies to the Ukrainian Constituent Assembly was called, with the elected assembly to convene by January 20. However, Bolshevik uprisings in major Ukrainian cities during the following weeks prevented the assembly from happening, even though unofficial election results had 70 percent of the electorate voting for Ukrainian political parties as opposed to Soviet ones.
- U.S. President Woodrow Wilson pledged the United States House of Representatives pass an amendment to the U.S. Constitution for women to have the right to vote.
- Federal troops engaged Yaqui Indian warriors at the Battle of Bear Valley in Arizona, a minor skirmish and one of the last battles of the American Indian Wars between the United States and Native Americans.
- German submarine SM UB-69 was depth charged and sunk in the Mediterranean Sea off Algeria with the loss of all 31 crew.
- According to a Japanese government official report, a powder snow avalanche hit in Mitsumata village, (now Yuzawa), Niigata Prefecture, Japan. The resulting death toll number was 158 persons, the worst avalanche accident in nation's history.
- German flying ace Max Ritter von Müller was killed during a dog fight with three British planes over Moorslede, Belgium. Bullets struck the fuel tank of the German pilot's Albatros airplane, causing it to ignite. Müller was forced to abandon the plane without a parachute and plummeted to his death. He was credited with 36 kills, making him the 15th-highest scoring German flying ace of World War I.
- Born: Alma Ziegler, American baseball player, infielder and pitcher for the All-American Girls Professional Baseball League from 1944 to 1954; in Chicago, United States (d. 2005)
- Died: Émile Reynaud, 73, French inventor, developed the praxinoscope, precursor to modern film projection (b. 1844)

== January 10, 1918 (Thursday) ==
- A Russian delegation headed by Leon Trotsky recognized the Ukrainian People's Republic as a sovereign nation during opening peace negotiations with the Central Powers.
- The United States House of Representatives passed a constitutional amendment to extend voting rights to women by two-thirds of the House, with only one vote to spare. However, the Senate held off debate on the vote until October.
- Born:
  - Arthur Chung, Guyanese state leader, first President of Guyana, first Asian head of state of a non-Asian country; in West Demerara, British Guiana (present-day Guyana) (d. 2008)
  - Gunnar Sønsteby, Norwegian army officer, commander of Norwegian Independent Company 1, most decorated Norwegian soldier during World War II including the War Cross, Distinguished Service Order, Defence Medal, and Medal of Freedom; in Rjukan, Norway (d. 2012)
- Died: María Dolores Rodríguez Sopeña, 69, Spanish clergy, founder of the Sisters of the Catechetical Institute, beatified by Pope John Paul II in 2003, in Vélez-Rubio, Spain (b. 1848)

== January 11, 1918 (Friday) ==
- Ukrainian–Soviet War – Bolshevik forces defeated Ukrainian counterrevolutionaries in Ekaterinoslav (now Dnipro), Ukraine.
- The Luftstreitkräfte established air squadrons Jagdstaffel 60 and 61.
- The Catholic Church established the Diocese of Lafayette in Louisiana.
- The association football league Federação Maranhense was established to manage all football tournaments in Maranhão, Brazil.

== January 12, 1918 (Saturday) ==
- The Central Powers recognized the Ukrainian People's Republic as a sovereign nation and began peace negotiations.
- Battle of Galați – A rogue Russian army of 12,000 troopers retreating from the dissolving Eastern Front threatened Galați, Romania which was defended by a Romanian garrison of 500 men.
- Royal Navy destroyers HMS Narborough and HMS Opal ran aground and were wrecked off Orkney, Scotland in a severe storm, with a total 268 sailors lost (only one survivor was picked up).
- A mining explosion caused by firedamp killed 155 miners (plus one rescue worker in the aftermath) at Halmer End in the North Staffordshire Coalfield, England.
- Finland enacted a "Mosaic Confessors" law which granted Finnish Jews full civil rights.
- A decree issued by the Council of Peoples' Commissars of the Republic put all Russian aircraft manufacturing companies under state control.
- The RAF Scopwick airbase was established near Scopwick, England.
- United States Congress established the U.S. Army Distinguished Service Medal for those distinguishing themselves for exceptional service in the American military. The medal was awarded more than 2,000 times during World War I, and was also awarded to eleven of the Allied command including Ferdinand Foch, Joseph Joffre, Philippe Pétain, Douglas Haig, John J. Pershing, and Arthur Currie.
- Died: Émile Storms, 71, Belgian army officer and explorer, founder of the Mpala missionary in the Belgian Congo (b. 1846)

== January 13, 1918 (Sunday) ==
- Shamkhor massacre – A total 2,000 Russians soldiers were massacred at Shamkhor, Azerbaijan, either in the initial battle three days earlier or in subsequent days by local mobs, angered at the looting and terror retreating Russians troops inflicted on the South Caucasus region. Thousands more were able to make it back to Russia.
- Born: Ahn Sahng-hong, Korean religious leader, founder of the Witnesses of Jesus Church of God, the precursor to the World Mission Society Church of God; in Jangsu County, Korea (present-day South Korea) (d. 1985)
- Died: James H. Brady, 55, American politician, eighth Governor of Idaho (b. 1862)

== January 14, 1918 (Monday) ==
- Bolshevik forces captured Simferopol, the capital of Crimean People's Republic, where they arrested its president Noman Çelebicihan.
- German submarine SM UB-63 departed for a patrol in the North Sea and was never seen again, with all 33 crew lost.
- Royal Navy submarine HMS G8 disappeared while on patrol in the North Sea. It was believed to have struck a mine and sank with all 31 crew on board.

== January 15, 1918 (Tuesday) ==
- The keel of Royal Navy vessel HMS Hermes was laid in Britain, the first purpose-designed aircraft carrier to be built.
- The United States Army established First Corps in Neufchâteau, France with Major General Hunter Liggett taking command on January 20. With the corps including the famous First ("Big Red One") and Second U.S. Infantry Divisions, the corps played a decisive role in the Second Battle of the Marne.
- Devastated by savage reviews for the musical Gay Paree that he personally financed and produced in Glasgow, popular performing artist Mark Sheridan disappeared from the theater and was later found dead in Kelvingrove Park with a self-inflicted gunshot wound to the head. Sheridan was one of the first major popular recording artists, with hit songs such as "I Do Like to Be Beside the Seaside" and "Belgium Put the Kibosh on the Kaiser".
- The Fløibanen funicular rail line was established in Bergen, Norway.
- The Hamburg U-Bahn opened the Alster Valley Railway in Hamburg with stations in Hoheneichen, Kornweg, Poppenbüttel, and Wellingsbüttel.
- Born:
  - João Figueiredo, Brazilian state leader, 30th President of Brazil; in Rio de Janeiro, Brazil (d. 1999)
  - Gamal Abdel Nasser, Egyptian state leader, second President of Egypt; in Alexandria, Sultanate of Egypt (present-day Egypt) (d. 1970)
  - Rachel B. Noel, American public servant, elected to the Denver Public Schools board of education in 1965, the first African-American woman elected to a public position in Colorado; in Hampton, Virginia, United States (d. 2008)
  - Diana Barnato Walker, British aviator, first woman to break the sound barrier; as Diana Barnato, in Surrey, England (d. 2008)
- Died: William Caley, 44, American football player, fullback for the University of Colorado Boulder from 1893 to 1895 and University of Michigan from 1896 to 1898; died in a mining accident (b. 1873)

== January 16, 1918 (Wednesday) ==
- The Luftstreitkräfte established air squadrons Jagdstaffel 62 and 63.
- The Estonian Artillery Battalion was established.
- Born:
  - Stirling Silliphant, American screenwriter and television producer, creator of the television series Naked City and Route 66, recipient of the Academy Award for In the Heat of the Night; in Detroit, United States (d. 1996)
  - Clem Jones, Australian politician, longest-serving Lord Mayor of Brisbane from 1961 to 1975; in Ipswich, Queensland, Australia (d. 2007)

== January 17, 1918 (Thursday) ==
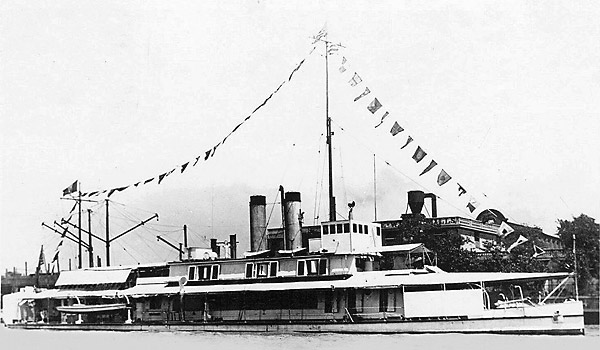
American gunboat Monocacy is fired upon by Chinese soldiers while on the Yangtze.

- USS Monocacy incident – An estimated 200 Chinese soldiers fired on U.S. Navy gunboat Monocacy while it was patrolling the Yangtze. One crewman was killed and two others were wounded in the volley before the gunboat returned fire and forced the soldiers to scatter. Under national protest, the Chinese government formally apologized to the United States and compensated the families of the casualties.
- Born:
  - George M. Leader, American politician, 36th Governor of Pennsylvania; in York, Pennsylvania, United States (d. 2013)
  - Kamal Amrohi, Indian film director, known for films Mahal, The Pure One, and Razia Sultan, founder of Kamal Pictures, now Mahal Films; as Syed Amir Haider Kamal Naqvi, in Amroha, British India (present-day India) (d. 1993)
  - Keith Joseph, British politician, cabinet minister of the Harold Macmillan, Alec Douglas-Home, Edward Heath and Margaret Thatcher administrations, Member of Parliament for Leeds North East from 1956 to 1987; in London, England (d. 1994)
  - Per Bergsland, Norwegian air force officer, one of the three men who successfully escaped from the German POW camp Stalag Luft III during World War II; in Norway (d. 1992)
  - Patrick D. Fleming, American air force officer, member of the Strategic Air Command test pilot group, for time recipient of the Distinguished Flying Cross and six-time recipient of the Air Medal, the Navy Cross and two Silver Stars; in New York City, United States (d. 1956, killed in a plane crash)
  - Jack Wilson, American boxer, silver medalist at the 1936 Summer Olympics; as George Dudley Wilson, in Spencer, North Carolina, United States (d. 1956)

== January 18, 1918 (Friday) ==
- The Russian Constituent Assembly met at Tauride Palace in Petrograd, with assembly president Viktor Chernov presiding. With only two months passed since the October Revolution, tensions were so high at the assembly that armed guards were brought into the chambers to keep order.
- The American Section of the Société de Chimie Industrielle was established in New York City in an attempt to rebuild the chemistry field disrupted from World War I.
- The Historic Concert for the Benefit of Widows and Orphans of Austrian and Hungarian Soldiers was held at Konzerthaus, Vienna.

== January 19, 1918 (Saturday) ==
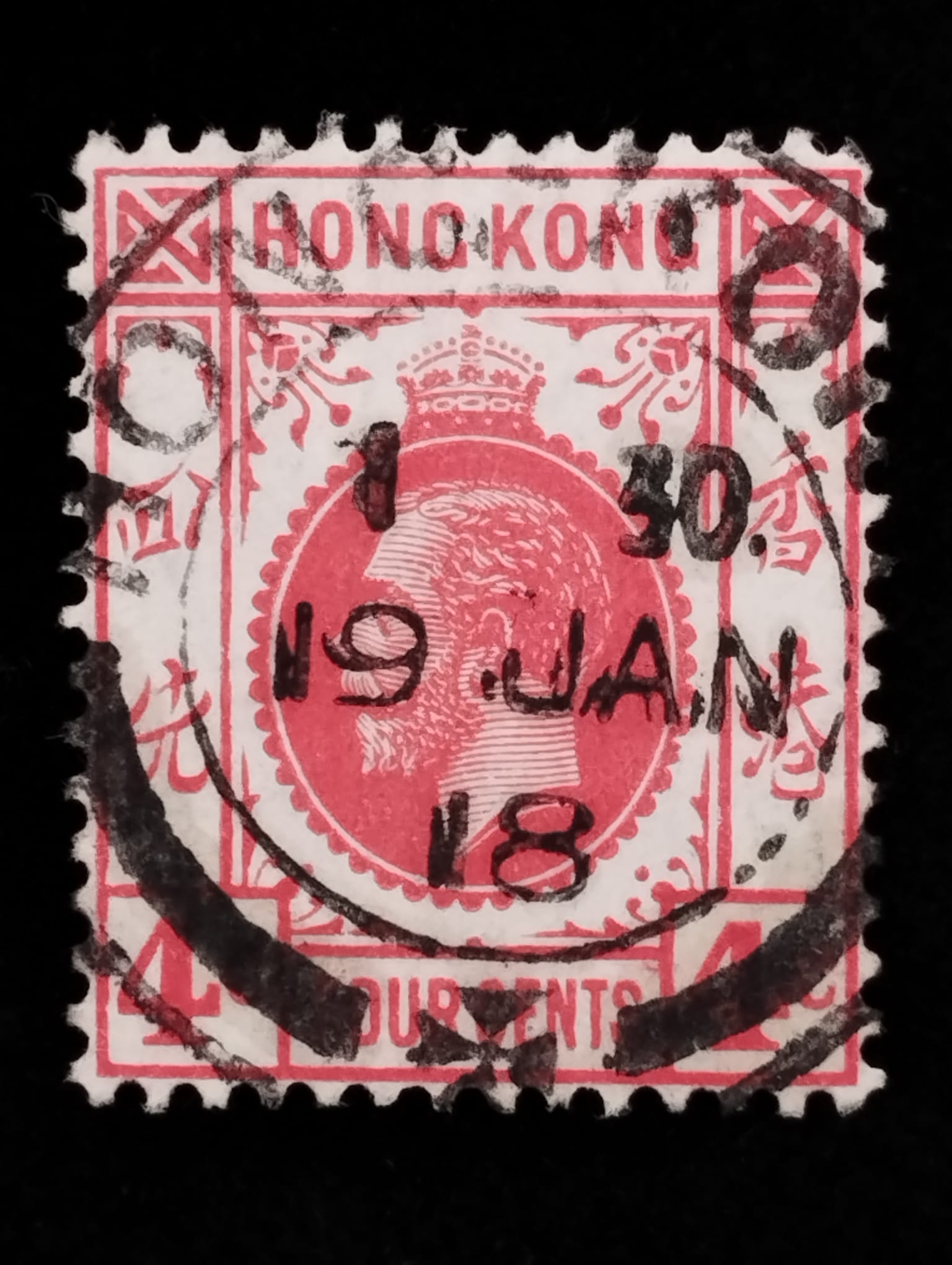
A timepiece created in Victoria Hong Kong on 19 January 1918 at 1:30

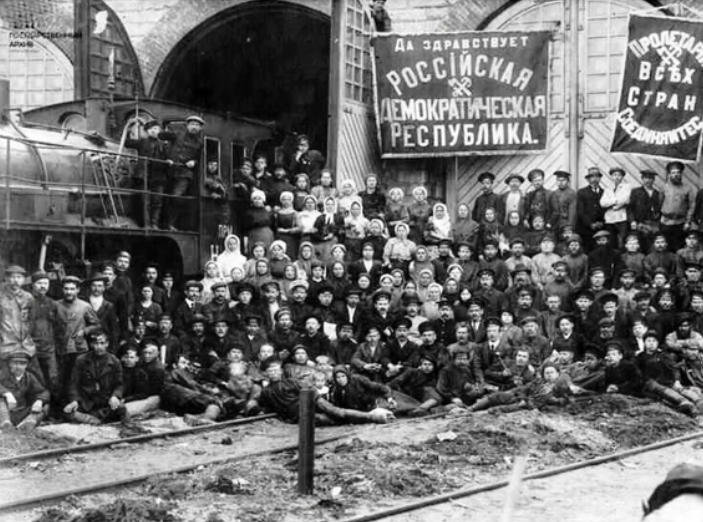
The Russian Democratic Federal Republic was proclaimed, then defeated the same day by the Bolsheviks.

- The Russian Constituent Assembly proclaimed Russia as a democratic republic, but was dissolved by the Bolshevik government on the same day.
- Battle of Galați – Russian forces began shelling Galați, Romania.
- German submarine SM UB-22 struck a mine and sank in the Heligoland Bight with the loss of all 22 crew.
- A rail accident between the Little Salkeld and Lazonby railway stations in England killed seven people.
- The Souther Field air force base was established in Sumter County, Georgia. It was renamed Jimmy Carter Regional Airport in 2009.
- The Air Service Medical Research Laboratory was established at Hazelhurst Field, Mineola, New York, the predecessor to the United States Air Force School of Aerospace Medicine.
- Born: John H. Johnson, American publisher, founder of the Johnson Publishing Company; in Arkansas City, Arkansas, United States (d. 2005)

== January 20, 1918 (Sunday) ==
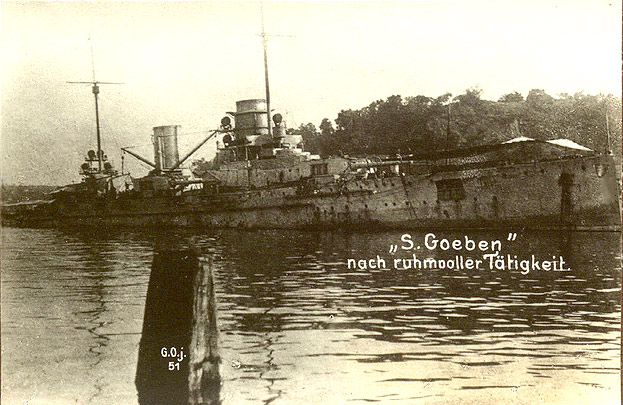
The Ottoman battlecruiser Yavûz Sultân Selîm beached following the Battle of Imbros.

- Battle of Imbros – An Ottoman naval squadron led by battlecruiser Yavûz Sultân Selîm and light cruiser Midilli (better known as former German ships SMS Goeben and SMS Breslau respectively) attacked Royal Navy ships off the island of Imbros in the Aegean Sea before assaulting the naval base at Mudros. The Ottoman Navy sank Royal Navy monitors HMS Raglan and HMS M28 while engaging destroyers HMS Tigress and HMS Lizard, killing 139 British sailors. However, the Ottoman ships accidentally passed into a minefield while withdrawing, where they became vulnerable to British aircraft. Combined mine strikes and damage from aircraft sank the Midilli while Yavûz Sultân Selîm ran aground on a sandbar where fellow destroyers protected it from strafing aircraft. As a result, the Ottoman Empire lost 330 sailors while another 172 were captured.
- Born:
  - Juan García Esquivel, Mexican jazz composer and bandleader, credited for developing space age pop, a form of lounge music; in Tampico, Mexico (d. 2002)
  - Esther Ballestrino, Uruguayan activist, founding member of Mothers of the Plaza de Mayo; in Encarnación, Paraguay (d. 1977, executed)
  - Sam Jethroe, American baseball player, center fielder for the Cleveland Buckeyes, Boston Braves, and Pittsburgh Pirates from 1942 to 1954; as Samuel Jethroe, in East St. Louis, Illinois, United States (d. 2001)
- Died: Beauchamp Duff, 62, British army officer, Commander-in-Chief of India during World War I, recipient of the Order of the Bath, Order of the Star of India, Order of the Indian Empire, Royal Victorian Order, and Order of Saint John; died by suicide (b. 1855)

== January 21, 1918 (Monday) ==
- Royal Navy armed boarding steamer HMS Louvain was torpedoed and sunk in the Aegean Sea by German submarine SM UC-22 with the loss of 227 lives.
- A cyclone struck Mackay, Queensland, Australia, delivering drenching rain over 72 hours totaling 2,161 mm. A total 30 people were killed in the storm and communications were knocked out so completely, it cut the town off from the rest of the country for five days.
- The Holsworthy railway line was established in New South Wales, Australia.
- The film drama Stella Maris, starring Mary Pickford and directed by Marshall Neilan, was adapted by screenwriter Frances Marion from the novel of the same name by William John Locke. It became the second highest-grossing film of the year. Copies of the film exist at the Mary Pickford Film Institute for Film Education and the Library of Congress.
- Born: Richard Winters, American army officer, commander of the 101st Airborne Division during World War II, recipient of the Distinguished Service Cross and the Bronze Star Medal; in New Holland, Pennsylvania, United States (d. 2011)
- Died: Emil Jellinek, 64, German automobile manufacturer, designer of the Mercedes 35 (b. 1853)

== January 22, 1918 (Tuesday) ==
- The Ukrainian People's Republic declared independence from Russia.
- Battle of Galați – Romanian forces counterattacked Russian forces using precise infantry charges supported by strategic aerial and naval bombardments. Although the Russians had superior numbers, their command had been decimated during the October Revolution and little order could be maintained. Thousands scattered and eventually the entire Russian force was disarmed and sent to Moldova.
- Born: Elmer Lach, Canadian ice hockey player, centre for the Montreal Canadiens from 1940 to 1954 and three-time winner of the Stanley Cup; in Nokomis, Saskatchewan, Canada (d. 2015)

== January 23, 1918 (Wednesday) ==
- The Luftstreitkräfte established air squadrons Jagdstaffel 64 and 65.
- British poet Robert Graves married painter Nancy Nicholson in London. Wedding guests included Wilfred Owen, whose first nationally published poem "Miners" appeared three days later in The Nation. Unfortunately, Graves' personal traumas from the war put pressure on the marriage, causing it to fall apart a few years later.
- Born:
  - Gertrude B. Elion, American biochemist, recipient of the Nobel Prize in Physiology or Medicine for the development of the drug azathioprine; in New York City, United States (d. 1999)
  - Charlie Kerins, Irish partisan leader, Chief of Staff for the Irish Republican Army; in Tralee, Ireland (d. 1944, executed)

== January 24, 1918 (Thursday) ==
- Romanian academic Onisifor Ghibu founded the newspaper New Romania in Chișinău, Moldova as a successor to the weekly newspaper Transylvania.
- Born:
  - Oral Roberts, American religious leader, founder of the Oral Roberts Evangelistic Association and Oral Roberts University; as Granville Oral Roberts, in Pontotoc County, Oklahoma, United States (d. 2009)
  - Gottfried von Einem, Austrian composer, known for works including operas Danton's Death, The Trial and The Visit from the Old Lady; in Bern, Switzerland (d. 1996)
  - Gerhard Boldt, German army officer, member of the Führerbunker military staff, recipient of the Knight's Cross of the Iron Cross, author of Hitler's Last Days: An Eye-Witness Account; in Lübeck, German Empire (present-day Germany) (d. 1981)

== January 25, 1918 (Friday) ==
- Born:
  - Ernie Harwell, American sportscaster, best known for baseball commentary for the Detroit Tigers; as William Earnest Harwell, in Washington, Georgia, United States (d. 2010)
  - George McTurnan Kahin, American political scientist and historian, leading expert on Southeast Asia and critic of the Vietnam War; in Baltimore, United States (d. 2000)

== January 26, 1918 (Saturday) ==
- German submarine SM U-84 was depth charged and sunk in St George's Channel by a U.S. Navy torpedo boat with the loss of all 40 crew.
- German submarine SM UB-35 was depth charged and sunk in the North Sea by Royal Navy destroyer HMS Leven with the loss of 26 of her 28 crew.
- Japanese martial artist Gunji Koizumi opened Budokwai, the first dojo in London, and the first judo club in Europe.
- The sports club Vika was established in Oslo and offered boxing, football, handball, ice hockey, cycling, swimming, and water polo.
- Born:
  - Nicolae Ceaușescu, Romanian state leader, first President of Romania; in Scornicești, Kingdom of Romania (present-day Romania) (d. 1989, executed)
  - Philip José Farmer, American science fiction writer, author of the World of Tiers and Riverworld series; in Terre Haute, Indiana, United States (d. 2009)
  - Fernando Castro Pacheco, Mexican artist, known for works including the murals at the Governor's Palace in Mérida; in Mérida, Yucatán, Mexico (d. 2013)
  - Vito Scotti, American character actor, best known for his roles in Love, American Style, Cactus Flower, and The Godfather; as Vito Giusto Scozzari, in San Francisco, United States (d. 1996)
  - Amy Witting, Australian writer, known for novels and poetry including I for Isobel and Isobel on the Way to the Corner Shop, recipient of the Order of Australia; as Joan Austral Fraser, in Sydney, Australia (d. 2001)
- Died:
  - Grand Duke Nicholas Konstantinovich of Russia, 67, Russian noble, son of Grand Duke Konstantin Nikolayevich of Russia and grandson of Nicholas I of Russia (b. 1850)
  - Ewald Hering, 83, German physiologist, known for his research into color vision and development of the opponent process (b. 1834)

== January 27, 1918 (Sunday) ==
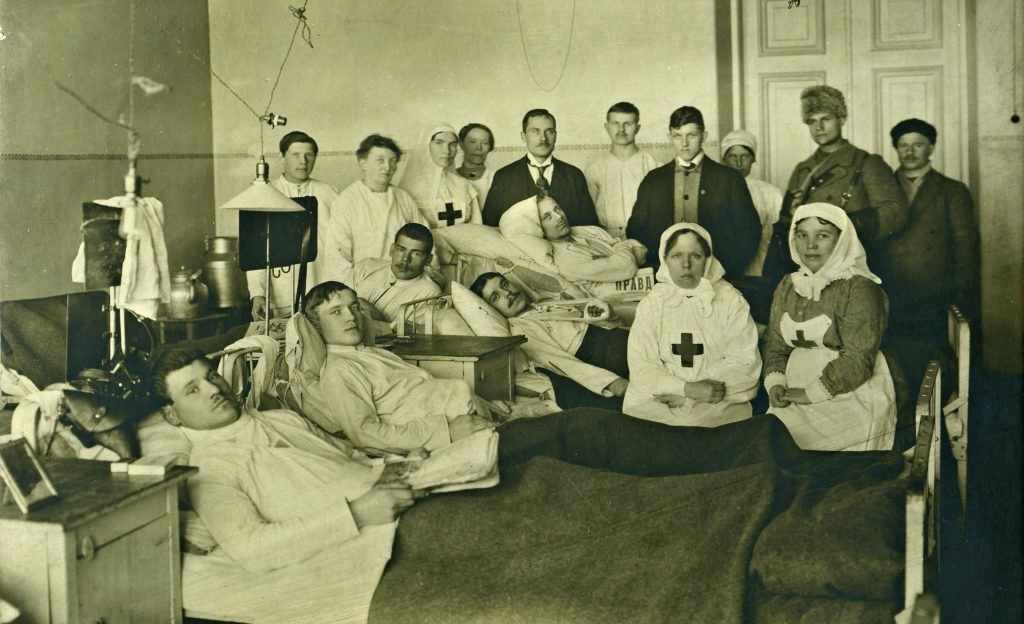
Wounded Finnish Red soldiers recovering in hospital in Vyborg, Finland at the start of the country's civil war.

- The Finnish Civil War began with the Battle of Kämärä between the Whites (loyal to Finnish independence) and the Reds (in support of soviet government with close ties to Russia).
- Ukrainian–Soviet War – An uprising in Odessa involving Bolshevik militia and the Black Sea Fleet captured the rail station, post office, and key government buildings.
- British ocean liner RMS Andania was torpedoed and sunk in the Irish Sea by German submarine SM U-46 with the loss of seven crew.
- Royal Navy submarine HMS E14 attempted to destroy the vulnerable Ottoman battlecruiser Yavûz Sultân Selîm while it was waiting to be towed back to port by Ottoman battleship Turgut Reis, but failed to score a proper hit.
- The Luftstreitkräfte established air squadrons Jagdstaffel 66 and 67.
- The adventure film Tarzan of the Apes was the first movie released featuring the hero created by Edgar Rice Burroughs. Elmo Lincoln played Tarzan with Enid Markey as Jane. The film, directed by Scott Sidney, was filmed in the Louisiana swamps to stand in as the African jungle. The film grossed $1 million and spawned the sequel The Romance of Tarzan released later the same year.
- Born:
  - Skitch Henderson, American musician, bandleader for The New York Pops and The Tonight Show Band; as Lyle Russel Henderson, in Halstad, Minnesota, United States (d. 2005)
  - Elmore James, American blues musician, best known for his slide guitar work for songs including "The Sky Is Crying" and "Bleeding Heart"; as Elmore Brooks, in Holmes County, Mississippi, United States (d. 1963)
- Died: William Greenwell, 97, English archaeologist, chief excavator of the Danes Graves and Grime's Graves (b. 1820)

== January 28, 1918 (Monday) ==
- The Council of People's Commissars of the newly evolved Soviet Russia began organizing a regular army "formed from the class-conscious and best elements of the working classes."
- The Kuban People's Republic was established to oppose the Bolsheviks but was defeated by the Red Army the following year.
- Germany launched the first bombing raid on England after two months with 13 Gotha and two Riesenflugzeug bombers. Six Gothas turned back due to poor visibility, but the others bombed targets that killed a total 67 people and injured 166 civilians. The Royal Flying Corps scrambled aircraft to intercept the bombers, with pilots Charles C. Banks and George Hackwill of the No. 40 Squadron shooting down a Gotha, the first victory over a heavier-than-air bomber (both received the Distinguished Flying Cross for the achievement.
- Ukrainian–Soviet War – Ukrainian forces recaptured many of the public buildings taken by Bolshevik forces the previous day in Odessa.
- German submarine SM U-109 struck a mine and sank in the English Channel with the loss of all 43 crew.
- While being pursued by the Ottoman Navy for attempting to destroy the disabled Ottoman battlecruiser Yavûz Sultân Selîm, Royal Navy submarine HMS E14 was damaged when one of the torpedoes exploded by accident on board. The sub was forced to surface and beach itself where the crew tried to scuttle it. The sub was hit again by coastal artillery off Turkey with the loss of 21 of her 30 crew, including sub commander Geoffrey Saxton White. The seven survivors were taken as prisoners of war. White was posthumously awarded the Victoria Cross for his efforts to beach the submarine and save his crew.
- Porvenir massacre – A posse of Texas Rangers and local ranchers on the trail for Mexican raiders that attacked the Britte Ranch on Christmas Day in Presidio County, Texas entered the nearby Mexican village of Porvenir to round up potential suspects. In the ensuing commotion, 15 village men were separated and taken to a nearby hill in the outskirts where they were shot. A 1919 federal investigation concluded there was no evidence the villagers were connected to the local banditry. While a grand jury did not find the Texas Rangers involved guilty, their unit was dissolved with five being dismissed and the rest reassigned.
- The United States Telephone Herald Company officially dissolved after its business charter in Delaware was repealed.
- Born: Jerry Andrus, American magician, best known for his optical illusions showcased at the Capital of Chaos in Albany, Oregon; in Sheridan, Wyoming, United States (d. 2007)
- Died: John McCrae, 45, Canadian army medical officer and poet, author of "In Flanders Fields" (b. 1872)

== January 29, 1918 (Tuesday) ==
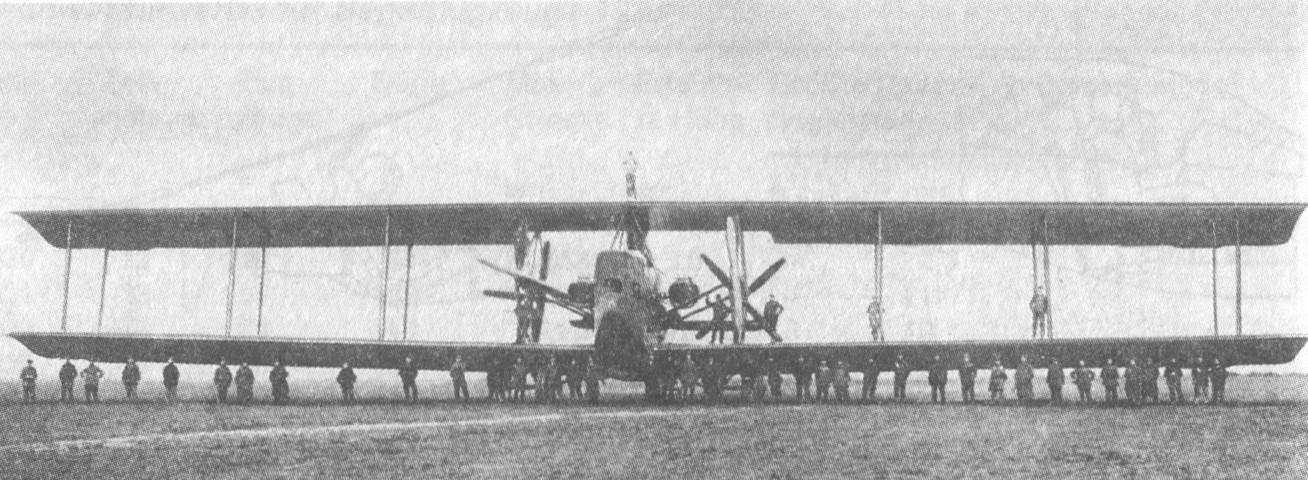
One of the Riesenflugzeug bombers that attacked England.

- Ukrainian–Soviet War – Workers backed by the Bolsheviks at an arsenal factory in Kiev staged an uprising against the government of the Ukrainian People's Republic.
- Ukrainian–Soviet War – Bolshevik forces overcame Ukrainian counterattacks after heavy street fighting in Odessa.
- A German air squadron of four Riesenflugzeug bombers attacked England, the first time such aircraft conducted a bombing raid on their own. Three of them reached their targets but only inflicted light damage and casualties.
- Russian army officer Alexey Kaledin, commander of the Don Cossacks which had strong loyalty to the Russian aristocracy, resigned from his post as the Kaledinschina counterrevolutionary rebellion faced setbacks at Rostov-on-Don, Russia. He committed suicide two weeks later.
- The United States Army established the 354th Aero Squadron at Kelly Field, Texas.
- Born:
  - John Forsythe, American actor, best known for the role of Blake Carrington in the 1980s TV series Dynasty and the voice of Charlie Townsend in the 1970s TV series Charlie's Angels; as John Lincoln Freund, in Penns Grove, New Jersey, United States (d. 2010)
  - Gerald Heaney, American judge, justice for the United States Court of Appeals for the Eighth Circuit from 1966 to 1988; in Goodhue, Minnesota, United States (d. 2010)
  - Bill Rigney, American baseball player and manager, infielder for the New York Giants from 1946 to 1953, manager for the San Francisco Giants, Los Angeles Angels, and Minnesota Twins from 1956 to 1976; as William Joseph Rigney, in Alameda, California, United States (d. 2001)
- Died: Édouard Chavannes, 52, French academic, leading expert on Chinese history and Chinese folk religion, translator of Records of the Grand Historian by Sima Qian (b. 1865)

== January 30, 1918 (Wednesday) ==
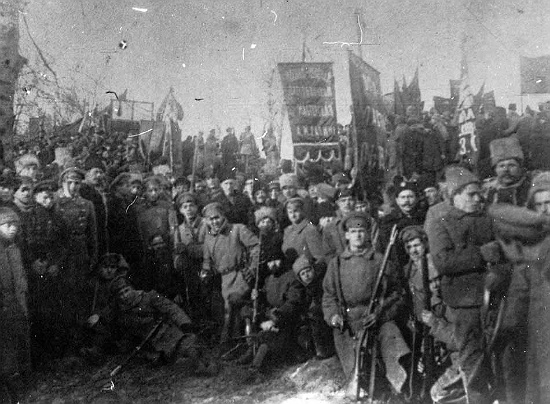
Participants of the January Uprising in Kiev.

- Ukrainian–Soviet War – Militia with the Ukrainian People's Republic surrendered to Bolshevik forces, allowing the Odessa Soviet Republic to be established.
- Ukrainian–Soviet War – An armed factory revolt instigated a general strike that paralyzed Kiev.
- Soviet–Ukrainian War – A small unit of 400 Ukraine soldiers, many of them cadets, delayed a Bolshevik force of 4,000 from entering Kiev. Over half of the unit perished in the five-hour battle but allowed the Ukrainian People's Republic to secure a peace treaty with the Central Powers and gain protections from Germany against Soviet Russia.
- American air force pilot Carl Mather was killed in an aircraft collision at Ellington Field, Texas. The future air base at Rancho Cordova, California was named after him (later renamed Sacramento Mather Airport).
- The Naval Division for War Operations of Brazil was established.
- Born:
  - André Bjerke, Norwegian poet and novelist, best known for his mystery novels featuring detective Kai Bugge including Lake of the Dead; as Jarl André Bjerke, in Aker, Norway (present-day Oslo, Norway) (d. 1985)
  - John Grayburn, British army officer, commander of the 2nd Battalion, Parachute Regiment during World War II, recipient of the Victoria Cross; in Karachi, British India (present-day Pakistan) (d. 1944, killed in action)
  - Meir Meivar, Israeli military commander, leader of defense for the city of Safed during the 1948 Arab–Israeli War; as Meir Meiberg, in Safed, Palestine (present-day Israel) (d. 2000)

== January 31, 1918 (Thursday) ==
- Battle of May Island – Ships part of a large Royal Navy fleet in the Firth of Forth began accidentally colliding with each other due to confusion in heavy fog, resulting in the sinking of submarines HMS K4 and HMS K17, damage to three other submarines and a light cruiser, and 104 men killed.
- Died: Ivan Puluj, 72, Ukrainian-German physicist, early developer of X-ray medical imaging (b. 1845)
