= Zaamurets =

Zaamurets Заамурец
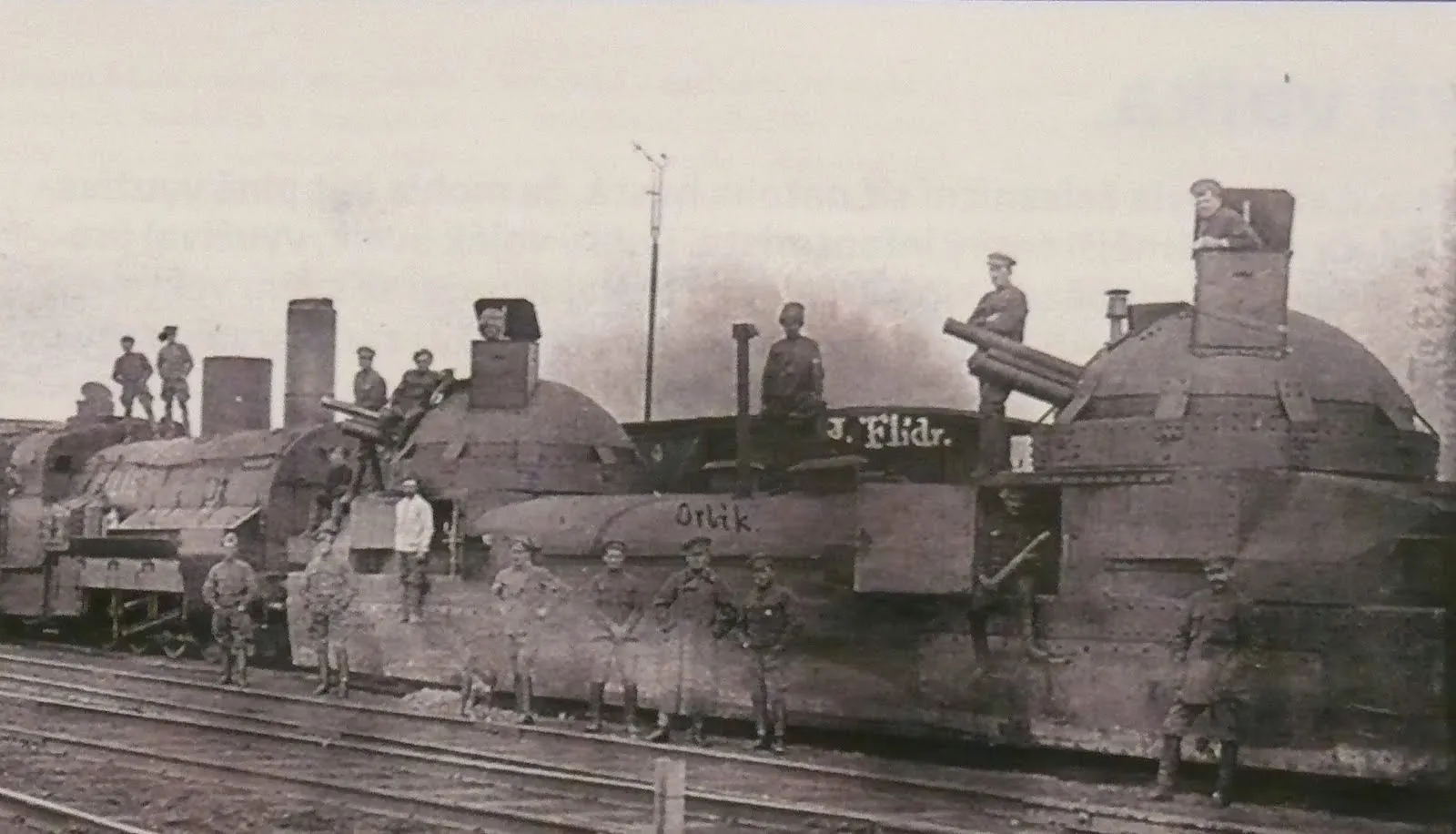
- A photograph of Zaamurets in Vladivostok, 1920
- Type: Armoured train
- Place of origin: Russia

Service history
- In service: 1916 – c. 1931
- Used by: Russian Empire (1916–1918); Ukrainian anarchists (1918); Red Guards (1918); Czechoslovak Legion (1918–1920); White movement (1920–1931); Empire of Japan (1931–?)
- Wars: World War I; Russian Civil War; Second Zhili–Fengtian War; Japanese invasion of Manchuria

Production history
- No. built: 1

Specifications
- Rate of fire: 60 rpm (Nordenfelt)
- Armor: 12 mm on curved and inclined surfaces; 16 mm on vertical surfaces
- Main armament: 2× 57mm QF 6-pounder Nordenfelt guns (1916 – August 1918); 2× 76mm M1902 guns (August 1918 –)
- Secondary armament: c. 12 machine guns
- Engine: 1× Fiat 60 hp petrol engine; 1× Florence 60 hp petrol engine
- Suspension: Unique to Zaamurets
- Maximum speed: 45 km/h (28 mph)

Zaamurets (Russian: Заамурец) (Note: Throughout its service Zaamurets was known by several names, including Lenin, Orlik Vehicle Part 1, and Train No. 105) was an armored train built by the Russian Empire in 1916. While originally made to fight in the First World War, it was extensively used in the Russian Civil War by Bolsheviks, Ukrainian anarchists and most notably the Czechoslovak Legion. It was then given to the White Movement to assist Chinese warlords, before eventually being captured by the Empire of Japan. During its service it was frequently renamed and reconfigured as it changed hands and traveled across Eurasia.

== History ==
=== Russian and Ukrainian service ===
During the start of World War I, the Russian Empire's armored trains performed well, but had issues with mobility and fire control. To remedy this, Russia ordered the construction of three motorized armored traincars, which were lighter and self-propelled. In early 1916, construction began in Odesa. While the cost of each train was initially expected to cost 29,000 rubles, soon into the project the budget had increased to between 40,000 and 47,000 rubles per train, and the predicted time until completion was extended. By September 1916 the first train was almost complete, however the Putilov works manufacturing the gearbox failed to deliver the required part on time. On 7 October, 1916, Zaamurets was finished enough to be tested, and on 19 November, 1916, it was deployed to the Southwestern Front.

Due to a lull in combat when it was deployed, Zaamurets was initially used as an anti-aircraft weapon, though it later fought in the Southwest during the Kerensky offensive. In September 1917, it was transported to Odesa rail yards for modifications. While some of the upgrades were completed, the October Revolution disrupted plans. In December 1917, it was claimed by the Ukrainian Central Rada, despite the Rada being unable to work on it due to sabotage. On 15 January, 1918, Zaamurets was seized by Bolshevik forces as part of the Odessa Bolshevik uprising, and used to defend the Odesa-Mala railway station.

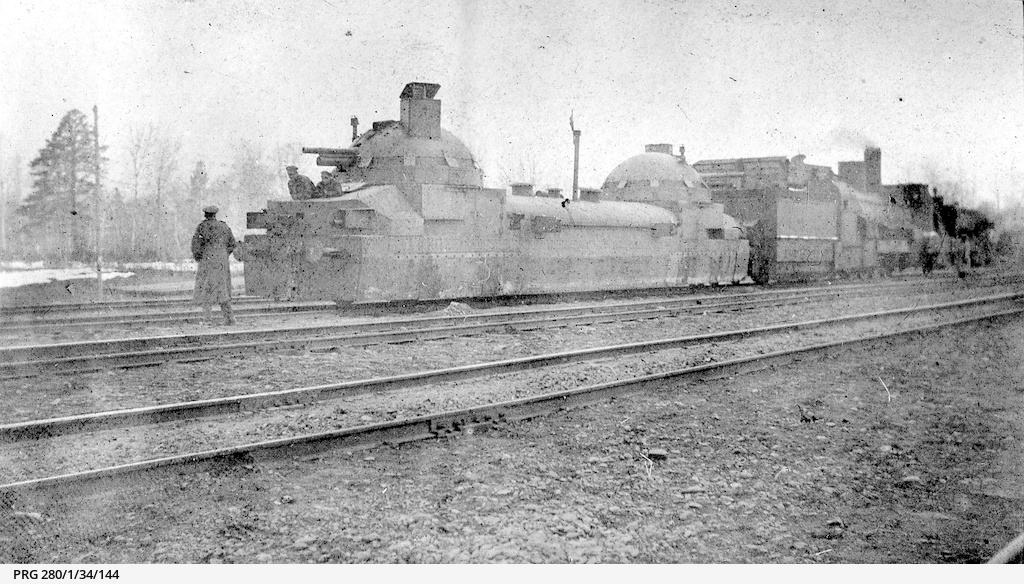
Zaamurets at a standstill on a railway, after modifications

Zaamurets was briefly seized by anarchist forces in February, but it was recaptured by Soviet forces in early March by a detachment of sailors from the Black Sea Fleet under Andrey Polupanov. Zaamurets was renamed to Lenin (Ленин), and attached to a Khunkhuz armored train known as BP No.3 that had previously been captured by Polupanov's forces. The combined train, named Svoboda ili smert (Свобода или смерть, 'Freedom or Death'), was dispatched to fight in the southern front of the Ukrainian–Soviet War against German, Austrian and Ukrainian forces near Odesa and Melitopol. In mid-May, Zaamurets was sent to Moscow for repairs, but on arrival Leon Trotsky ordered the crew be disbanded for engaging in partisan activities. However, after a meeting with Polupanov, Vladimir Lenin decided the train should remain in the hands of the sailors.

=== Czechoslovak legion ===
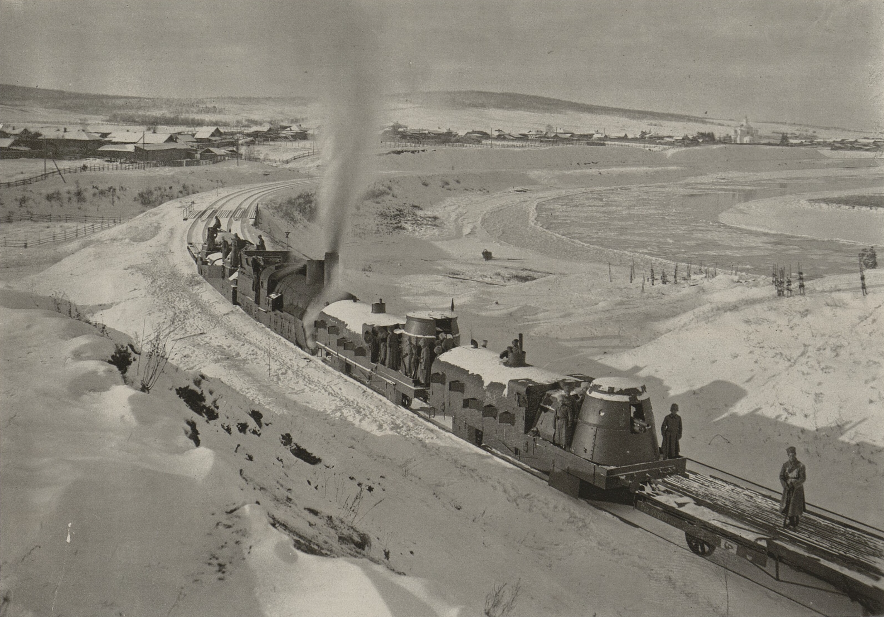
Zaamurets as part of Orlik in Irkutsk

In spring 1918, the Red Army ordered Polupanov to dispatch Zaamurets to the Trans-Siberian Railway to help counter the Czechoslovak Legion's use of armored trains. Soon after the train arrived in Simbirsk, the Red Army was forced to evacuate the city, leaving Zaamurets behind in working order. On 22 July 1918, Zaamurets was captured by the Czechoslovak Legion and added to the makeshift armored train Orlik (Orlík, 'Little Eagle'), which consisted of several armored trains previously captured by the Legion. Since the train was often split apart, Zaamurets was designated Orlik Vuz cis. 1 (Orlik Vehicle Part 1).

The Legion made extensive use of Zaamurets while occupying the Trans-Siberian Railway in spring and autumn 1918, before using it to patrol the railway for Bolshevik raids in 1919. As the Legion made its final eastward retreat to Vladivostok, where it was to evacuate, Orlik was put into service as the Legion's rearguard. East of Irkutsk, Ataman Grigory Semyonov's troops were obstructing the Legion's movements along the railway, and so in January Orlik led an attack against them before proceeding to Verkhneudinsk. While retreating along the Chinese Eastern Railway, the Orlik was captured by the Japanese Imperial Army at Hailar, Inner Mongolia, following a skirmish known as the Hailar incident in which over 20 Japanese soldiers died. The commander of the Siberian Expeditionary Army Ōi Shigemoto later gave it back to the Legion in Harbin following diplomatic negotiations. The train was finally returned to White Russian forces as the Legion departed Vladivostok, as to avoid it being taken by the Japanese.

=== In China ===
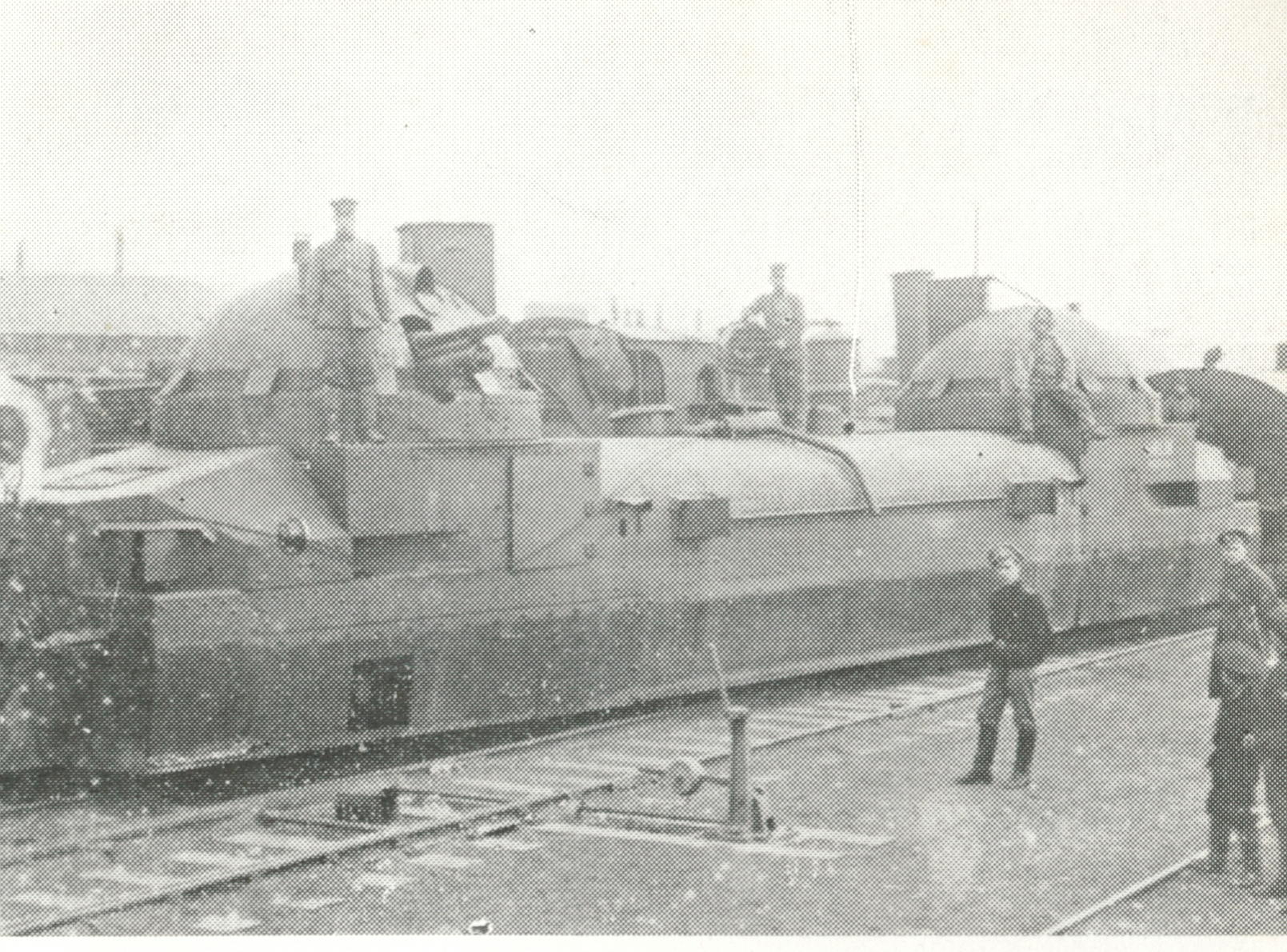
Zaamurets in 1920, photographed by Sasaki Tōichi

The White Russians kept Orlik, Zaamurets included, in Vladivostok until October 1922, when Red Army forces seized the city. White forces subsequently fled to Harbin with the Orlik, where the leader of Manchuria Zhang Zuolin provided sanctuary. In 1924, it was placed under the command of Lieutenant general Konstantin Nechaev, a Russian mercenary who used it to fight for the Fengtian Army under Zhang Zongchang during the Second Zhili–Fengtian War. It continued to serve in China for the following years, known under the name Train No. 105.

In 1931, Zaamurets was captured by the Japanese Kwantung Army, after which its history is unknown.

== Design ==
Zaamurets was originally designed to use the four-axle Fox-Arbel railway chassis, however this chassis was found to have pivot-beams and bogies too weak to support an armored train. The design was subsequently modified to rest on an Arbelevskoy platform.

When completed in 1916, Zaamurets was divided into five compartments: two cabins for commanders in the front and rear, two gun casemates abutting them, and one central casemate. The central casemate housed eight machine guns and two petrol engines: one Fiat engine and one Florence engine, both running at 60 horsepower. The engines were able to drive the train at a maximum speed of 45 km/h (28 mph). The two remaining casemates each housed a 57-mm Nordenfeld naval gun, which could fire at a rate of 60 rounds per minute. The commander's cabins were able to house three people each: one lookout who observed through small viewing slits and two people to man the two machine guns mounted in each compartment.

Zaamurets was armored with steel ranging between 12 and 16 mm (0.47 and 0.63 in). It was also equipped with internal telephones and colored lights which allowed for rapid communication between the compartments, seven periscopes, two rangefinders for air targets, and two Westinghouse brakes, one manual and one pneumatic. The amount of equipment made Zaamurets relatively cramped compared to other armored trains of the time, but not enough to impede its operation.

Zaamurets was refitted several times to change and add equipment and weapons. It was initially modified in September 1917 to increase turret height, mount armored booths onto the turrets to house gun commanders, install radiators, and improve ventilation. While it was also planned to upgrade the engines to 80-100 horsepower and install motors to turn the turrets, these further modifications were cut short with the outbreak of the October Revolution. Between July and August 1918, the Czechoslovak Legion replaced the Nordenfeld guns with two 76mm M1902 guns, as they had run out of 57mm shells.
