= Battle of Galați =

1918 battle between Romania and Russia

Coordinates: 45.2700°N 28.02°E

- Part of the Romanian Campaign of World War I and the Russian Civil War
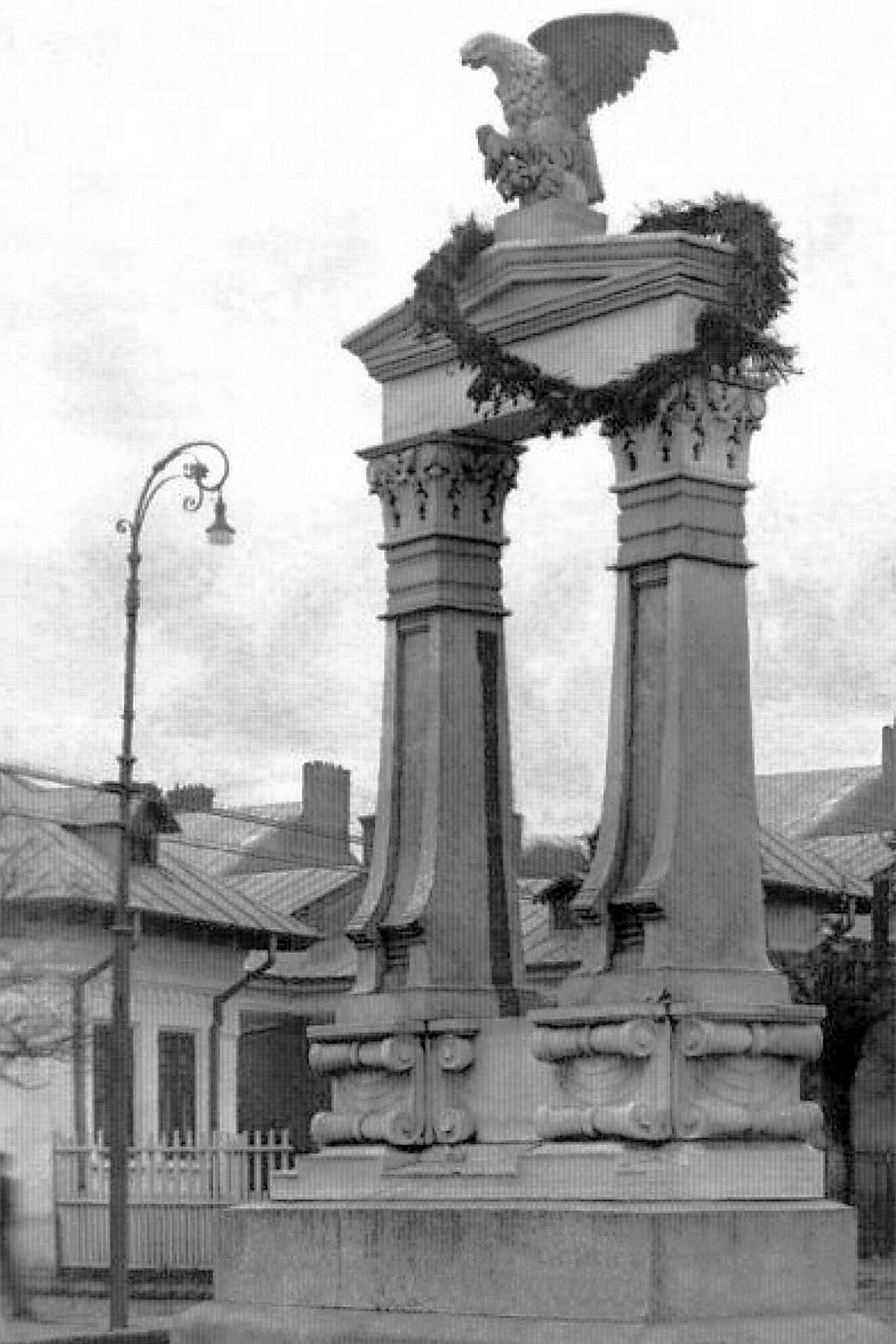
- Monument commemorating the Battle of Galați, photo from 1921
Date	12–22 January 1918
Location	Galați, Kingdom of Romania
Result	Romanian victory; Russian troops disarmed

Belligerents
Romania	Soviet Russia	(Russia) Scattered formations of the former Russian army

Commanders and leaders
(Kingdom of Romania) Constantin Prezan (Kingdom of Romania) Constantin Niculescu-Rizea	Yevgeni Iskritsky (surrendered)	(Russian Republic) Dmitry Shcherbachev

Strength
500 troops	12,000 troops	

Casualties and losses
Unknown	Unknown, but Russian troops got disarmed	

The Battle of Galați was a military engagement between the formerly allied Romanian and Russian troops at the end of World War I, as the former sought to prevent the latter from retreating from the armistice line along with their equipment.

== Background ==
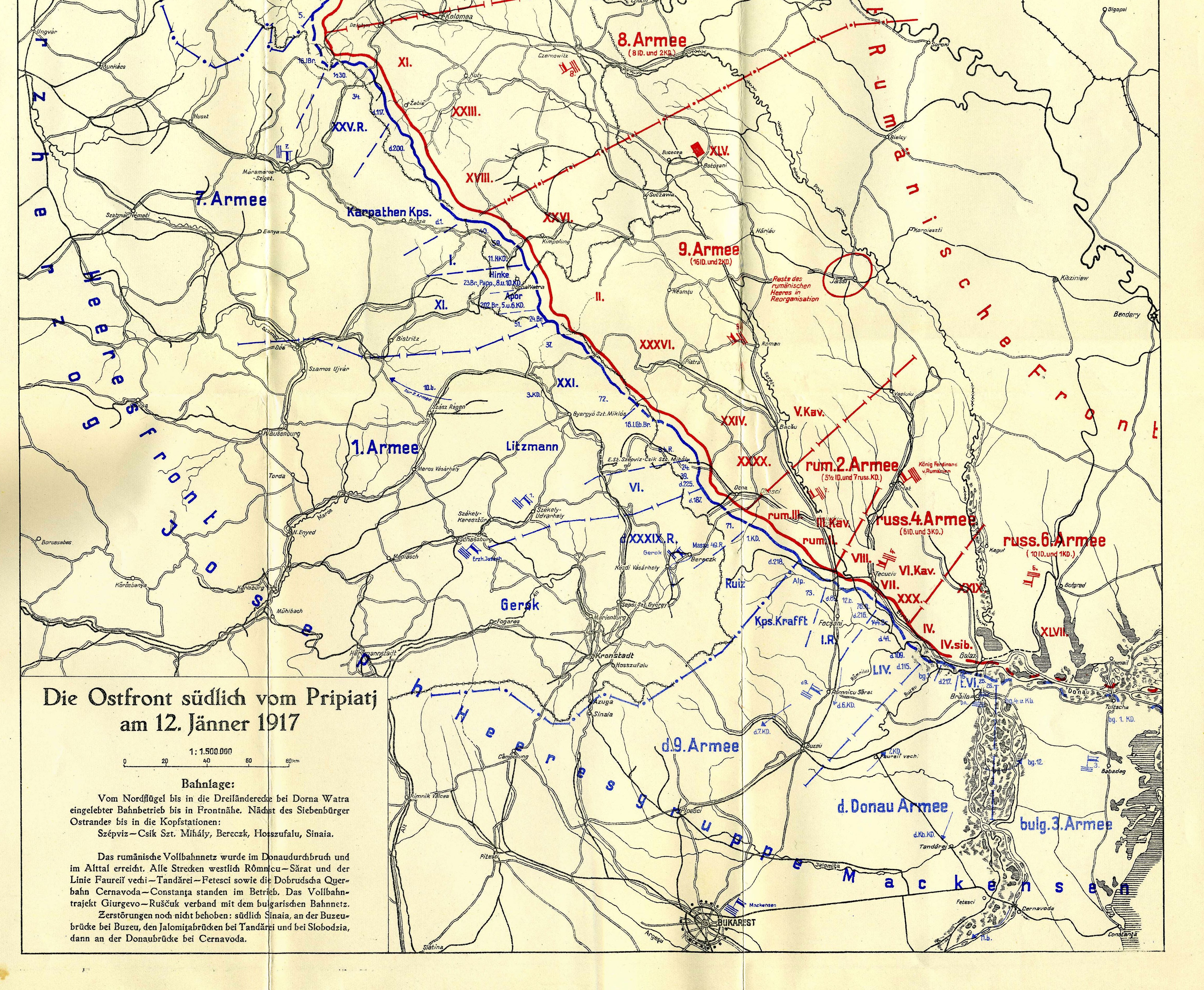
The frontline in January 1917 with the unit deployments

Romania was neutral for the first two years of World War I, but with the signing of the Treaty of Bucharest Romania joined the Entente Powers and declared war on 27 August 1916. After initial advances the Romanian military campaign quickly turned disastrous for Romania as the Central Powers occupied two-thirds of the country, including the capital Bucharest, within months and Russian troops were dispatched to the new front line in order to prop up the Romanian government and prevent an invasion of Russia from the south. Galați, the last port on the Romanian Danube River, was a vital lifeline for supplying the rump Romanian territory and the Russian Bessarabia Governorate and it remained on the Entente side of the front lines.

The 1917 February Revolution in Russia forced Tsar Nicholas II to abdicate but the Russian Provisional Government under Alexander Kerensky decided to continue the war on the Entente side though the battle lines remained mostly stalemated.

In the summer of 1917, the Romanian front saw one of the largest concentrations of combat forces and war matériel assembled during World War I: nine armies, 80 infantry divisions with 974 battalions, 19 cavalry divisions with 550 squadrons and 923 artillery batteries, whose effectives amounted to some 800,000 men, with about one million in their immediate reserve. Under Allied pressure to continue the war, Russia launched what became known as the Kerensky Offensive against the Central Powers. During this offensive Romania took part in three battles at Mărăști, Mărășești and Oituz, preventing a significant advance of the enemy troops.

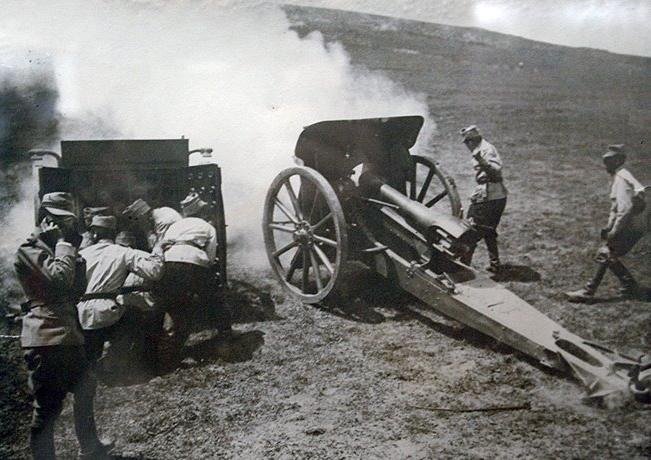
Romanian Model 1912 105 mm howitzer during the Battle of Mărăști

The Battle of Mărăști began on 24 July 1917 in the sector of the Romanian Second Army, the Russian Fourth Army, and the Russian Ninth Army. Initiated by surprise with three divisions, the offensive succeeded in disrupting the well-organized enemy defenses and compelling the Austro-Hungarians and Germans to retreat. The results of the offensive can be summarized as follows, the front line was broken on a 30 km (19 mi) stretch and penetrated to a depth of 20 km (12 mi), resulting in the liberation of a 500 km^{2} (190 sq mi) area comprising 30 villages, the Romanian forces took 2,700 prisoners, 70 guns, and important quantities of matériel, including a significant amount of munitions, and the Romanians lost trust in the Russian forces because when they tried to press their advantage they were told by the Russians that they had "no orders from the Revolution" to advance. But the two Russian Armies remained on Romanian soil.

When the October Revolution in Russia brought Vladimir Lenin to power, he immediately started negotiating a peace with the Germans that culminated with the 15 December 1917 armistice between Soviet Russia and the Central Powers. The Romanians separately negotiated the Armistice of Focșani, but millions of German and Russian soldiers still faced off across Romania.

The Russian Army, led by General Dmitry Shcherbachev, was headquartered in the Socola quarter of Iași, the Romanian capital-in-exile. The Russian army had begun disintegrating after the issuance of order No. 1 in February, but the pace increased after the armistice. Russian soldiers turned into brigands who often killed their officers, elected revolutionary committees and started looting, killing, and raping Romanian civilians. Shcherbachev lost control of most non-deserting Russian units to Bolshevik revolutionaries. Shcherbachev wrote to the Prime Minister of Romania, Ion I. C. Brătianu: "Russian armies have become gangs without leaders, poisoned with violent anarchy, unable to keep the front and incapable of organizing demobilization for withdrawal that without supply is itself a devastating work." But to his request for support Brătianu replied: "I can not raise any Romanian soldier to defend you against your own troops without seeing me mixed fighting in Russia without causing a conflict with the new rulers." But Romania would soon have to fight the Russians anyway.

In December 1917, radical Bolsheviks in Petrograd instigated a campaign to organize and initiate a Bolshevik revolution in Romania and Bessarabia. The Bolsheviks installed cannons overlooking the Romanian capital-in-exile. On 22 December 1917, Romanian soldiers attacked a camp of Bolsheviks and sent them on a train back to Russia. The next day another train filled with Bolshevik troops left Odessa but was turned back at the Prut River by Romanian soldiers. The next day a bomb was defused at the residence which was being used as the Royal House of King Ferdinand I of Romania.

== Disintegration of the Russian Army ==
Because of so many Russian troops still positioned on the front lines, the Romanian government started to take precautions in the rest of the country. The territory behind the front was divided into eight regions with military commands (Botoșani, Fălticeni, Iași, Podu Iloaiei, Roman, Vaslui, Bacău, and Bârlad) that reinforced the local gendarmerie with military units that hunted and deported the Russian gangs that roamed and plundered the land. The smaller groups were easily neutralized and sent across the Prut. Sporadic clashes occurred when guns were brought into action, but in most cases the incidents were solved peacefully.

The same could always not be said about cases of desertion and the cases of large units, divisions, or battalions leaving the front. Where possible, they were disarmed peacefully, then sent by train back to Russia. The Romanian orders from General Constantin Prezan were clear: No Russian unit could leave the front to go back to Russia without written approval from the Russian high command. The units that moved on their own initiative and without a precise order were to be disarmed. The orders also stated that Russian units should not be bullied and that Russian soldiers should be treated fairly and with dignity. But "all who live and move in this country, regardless of nationality, must comply with our laws and public order". The Romanian government's greatest fear was the Bolshevization of Romania.

On 12 January 1918 at Pechea, northwest of Galați, a delegation of the Russian 13th Division came to the 4th Romanian Division headquarters to announce that the next day, Russian troops would leave the front and cross the Prut River to the Moldavian Republic. General Shcherbachev ordered his troops to remain in the position, but was told that the Russians soldiers no longer recognized him as their commander and would leave for Russian soil. If Romanian troops resisted the move, the soldiers promised to destroy everything in their path.

Stationed on the front line between Tecuci and Galați was the Russian Sixth Army with approximately 35,000 troops. The 4th Romanian Division was placed behind to oversee them. After receiving the Russian ultimatum, the 4th Division started preparing and got two battalions with machine guns and artillery from the neighboring 13th Division to help. On 16 January 1918 the Russian 40th division started moving towards Bessarabia and crossed the Prut. The next day the Russian 12th Division started its withdrawal near Pechea, but returned to the front when blocked by the 4th Romanian Division. On 18 January 1918 the 9th Division of General Eugen Iskritsky's Siberian Corps started moving towards Galați where the 10th Division was already encamped. The 9th Division was filled with 6,000 soldiers dedicated to the cause of Bolshevism.

== Battle for Galați ==
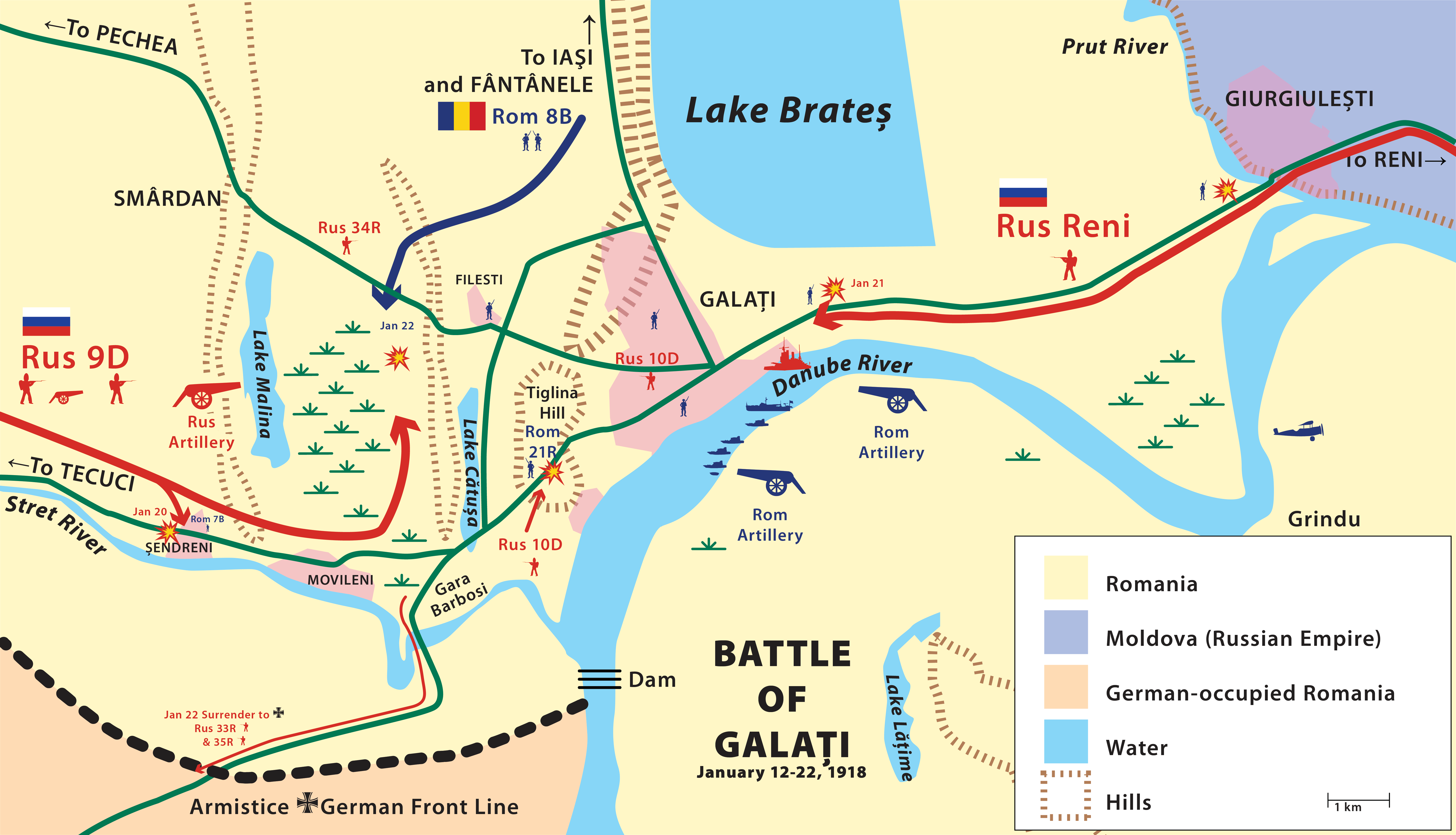
Troop movements in the Battle of Galați

For the citizens of Galați, the situation was alarming. The Siberian Corps had more soldiers than Galați had citizens. The Romanian archives speak for no more than 500 soldiers in all Romanian detachments. Romanian Navy Commander Constantin Niculescu-Rizea, the Galați sector commander, received an order to bar the road from the west from the Russian columns and to defend the city. Two Romanian companies and a half from the 21st Infantry Regiment defended the western approach to the city on Țiglina Hill. In central Galați there were a detachment of Marines and two platoons of infantry. Two small detachments were deployed at Filești to watch the northern approach and to the east to guard the approach from Bessarabia. From the Romanian Danube Flotilla, there were four gunboats of the Căpitan Nicolae Lascăr Bogdan-class, a torpedo boat, and a motorboat stationed on the Danube. Commander Rizea also ordered to place eight cannons from the cruiser Elisabeta on Țiglina Hill. Colonel Bădescu, commander of the 8th Brigade in Fântânele, had the mission to attack from the north and west of the Russian columns, located in the gorge of swamps Lake Mălina, Lake Cătușa, and the Siret River. The Russians forces were disproportionately far more numerous and better prepared.

The situation of the troops defending Galați is more than dramatic. They are attacked from 4 directions: west, north, east and south. In the city, the troops of the Russian 10th Division formed into combat units, without the possibility of being hindered by any Romanian troops. Any measure taken by the Romanian army contrasts with the numerical difference between Russian and Romanian soldiers of 4 to 1

— Constantin Kirițescu, History of the War for the Integration of Romania 1916-1919 (2nd ed.), Editura Casei Școalelor, Bucharest, 1925

On 19 January the Russian 9th Division swept through a small Romanian detachment at Șendreni and arrived at Movileni where they set up artillery. A Russian delegation went to Galați and asked Niculescu-Rizea to allow the Russian troops to pass through the city towards Bessarabia. Niculescu-Rizea replied that his order was to stop that action. The Russians gave an ultimatum. If they were not allowed to pass by 3 in the afternoon they would begin shelling Galați.

For 15 hours the Russian batteries near Movileni opened fire. Bombs fell in the city center, but they caused minimal damage because the Russians were firing at random. The archives do not note any casualties among the civilian population. The greater danger that night for the population was the attempt by the 10th Division to burn the city by filling cars with gasoline and driving flaming vehicles into buildings. During the day on 20 January, Romanian batteries returned the Russian fire from Movileni.

On 21 January the Russians continued bombing Galați. Russians occupied the bogs west of Lake Cătușa. A strong Russian detachment managed to capture one officer and 14 soldiers on Țiglina Hill. The Russian 34th Regiment attacked Filești. A Russian heavy battery and six machine guns were placed on Giurgiulești hill on the banks of the Prut and a Russian squadron consisting of two companies of machine guns, a cavalry squadron and a battery of artillery, crossed the Prut River, advancing toward Galați. They disarmed the Romanian border guards and militia posts. They placed artillery near Brateș Lake. Russian infantry, preceded by cavalry patrols, entered the city, where it bolstered over 200 armed infantry of the 10th Division. A Russian gunboat, armed with a 150 mm cannon came upstream from Reni. From Giurgiulești, artillery shells were dropped on Galați.

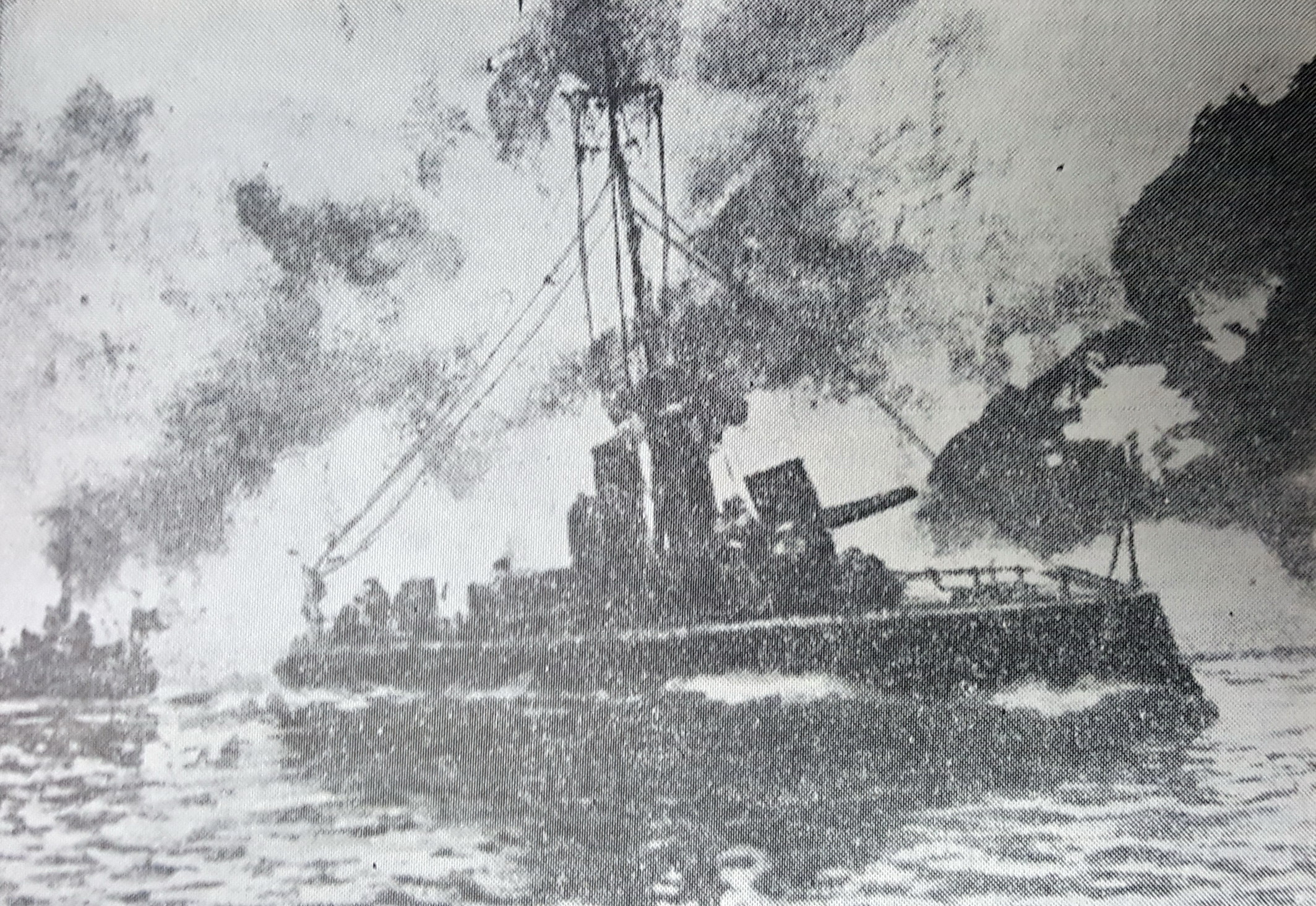
Gunboats providing fire support

On 22 January, the Romanians counterattacked. The Romanian 8th Brigade, arrived from Fântânele and surprised the Russian troops stationed in the bog north of Movileni. The Romanian ships on the Danube, batteries on the south bank, and three Romanian airplanes dropped bombs on the Russians. Romanian infantry led a bayonet charge up Țiglina Hill, freed the captured Romanians and sent the Russians on the run. The Filești detachment captured two platoons of infantry and a machine-gun section. Attacked and expelled from the north and east, the Russians in disarray began moving south to the Gara Barboși and the bridge over Siret. Romanian artillery and bombers targeted bombs on the mass of Russian soldiers gathered there. A handful of soldiers created panic among Russians, so much so that two regiments, the 33rd and 35th, almost 3,000 soldiers, ran south and surrendered to the Germans.

The fury with which the Romanians, significantly less numerous, counterattack, horrifies the Russians, who take a desperate and sensational decision. At 11:00 at night, they begin to cross the bridge and the front line and surrender to the Germans. It was a totally unexpected outcome and absolutely unique in the history of the First World War. A battle between two allied armies, in front of the enemy's positions and under his gaze

— Constantin Kirițescu, History of the War for the Integration of Romania 1916-1919, 2nd ed., Editura Casei Școalelor, Bucharest, 1925

By the end of the day the Russian troops agreed to surrender, were disarmed and sent off over the Prut to the Moldavian Democratic Republic.

== Aftermath ==
The victory won by the Romanian army in Galați had both military and political consequences, as not only the front was saved, but the bolshevization of other Russian military units on the front line (which totaled approximately a million soldiers) and even of Moldova. At that time, the city of Galați, a port on the Danube, located between Siret River (beyond which were the armies of the Central Powers) and Prut River (beyond which a large part of the Russian army had retreated to disorder), represented the southernmost point on the front line.

Following this victory, Bessarabia was able to receive the armed aid it had requested, so that it could protect the population from the robberies and crimes committed by the Russian armies that were retreating in great disorder.

Galați was not the only spot where Russian soldiers clashed with the Romanians. Over the next few days clashes between Russian and Romanian troops occurred in Bacău, Botoșani, Mihăileni, Pașcani, and Timișești. On 27 January the bloodiest clash occurred in Fălticeni. The Romanians lost 14 dead and 83 wounded. The Russians suffered over 100 dead and 500 wounded.

In February, Bolshevik bickering and dickering caused the Central Powers to repudiate the armistice on 18 February 1918, and in the next fortnight seized most of Ukraine, Belarus, and the Baltic countries in Operation Faustschlag. Romania was spared this attack.

By the end of March 1918, Romanian troops had entered the Moldavian Democratic Republic (mostly ethnically Romanian) and cleared it of Bolshevik troops. The National Council of the Moldavian Republic, Sfatul Țării, declared on 9 April 1918 the union with Romania. This union was recognized by the principal Allied Powers in the 1920 Treaty of Paris. The newly communist Russia did not recognize Romanian rule over Bessarabia, considering it an occupation of Russian territory.

== Highlights ==
The Battle of Galați in 1918 was one of the first armed confrontations following the rules of a modern warfare where all types of weapons are involved and perfectly cooperate, in our case, artillery, aviation, with a double role of recognition, but also that of supporting the land army by bombardment, then the fleet, whose shooting defended and supported the soldiers, who eventually got to the melee fight. Undoubtedly, the information transmission unit had an important role - by telephone, so that very good coordination could be achieved between all the army bodies.

— Mihaela Denisia Liușnea, The Romanian army engaged in a war with a new configuration and dynamics – the Battle of Galați, in January 1918, Analele Buzăului Vol X/2018, p. 187

Croce di guerra al valor militare

Croix de Guerre

The Battle of Galați was the only time in its history that Romania used air, land, and marine forces together in a single battle.
It is also the only battle in history in which former allied troops fought one another within eyesight of their former common enemy.

The importance of the Romanian victory in Galați against the Bolshevik troops was also highlighted by the awarding of two medals, by Italy and France. On 25 May 1921, the city of Galați was awarded "Croce di Guerra" by General Pietro Badoglio, Chief of Staff of the Italian Army, while French General Henri Berthelot presented it with the "Croix de Guerre". An arched monument was dedicated to the heroes of Galați, but it was torn down after the Communists took control of Romania after World War II. Following the Romanian Revolution of 1989 and the fall of communism, the monument was rebuilt in the same location, being inaugurated on January 20, 2018, on the 100th anniversary of the heroic battles fought to defend the city.

== Photo gallery ==
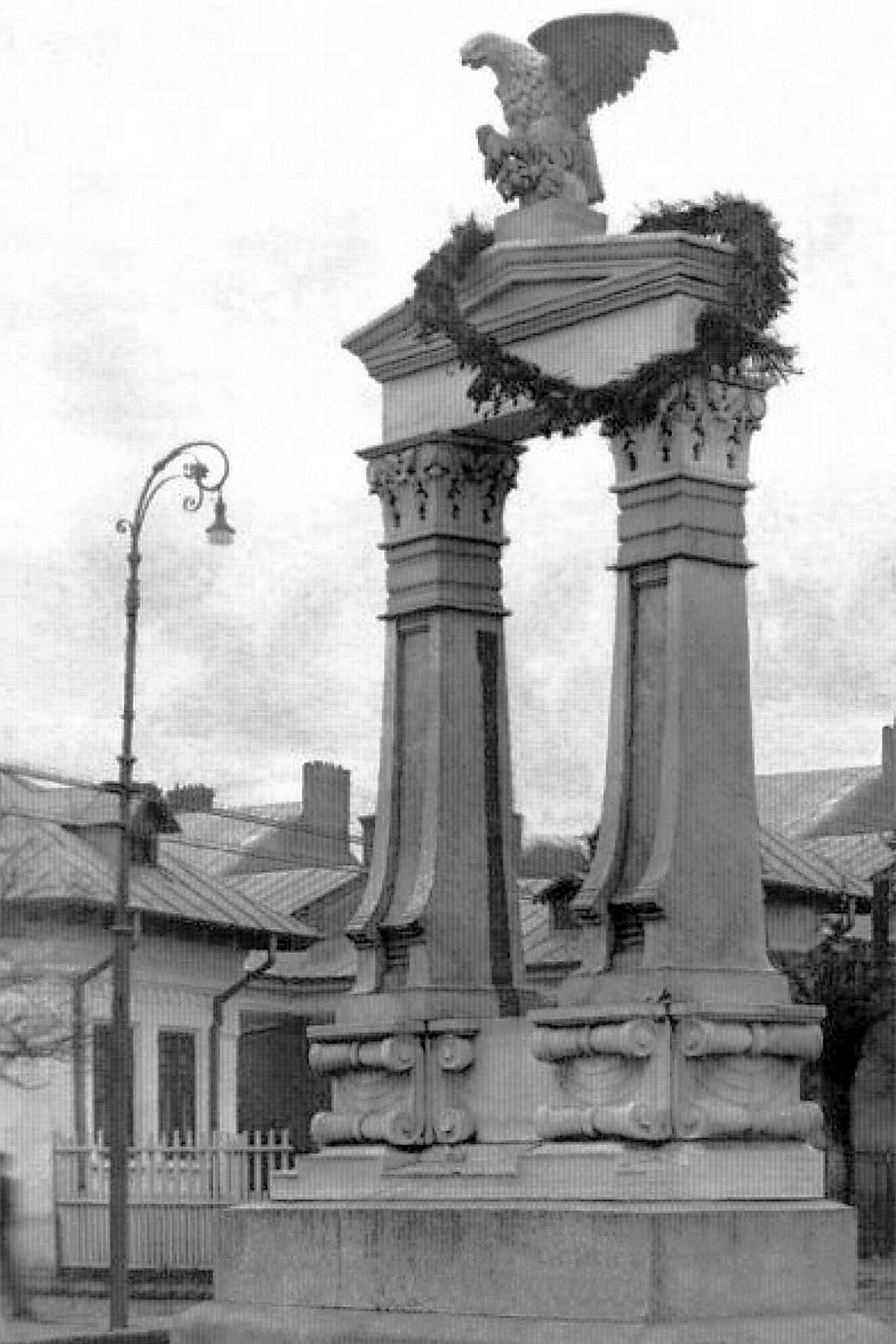
Monument to the heroes of the Battle of Galați, 1921

Portrait of General Constantin Prezan, Chief of Romanian General Staff, at the general headquarters in Ivești, 1917

Sentries on the Siret Front. Cosmești, 1916

House hit by a shell in Galați, 1916

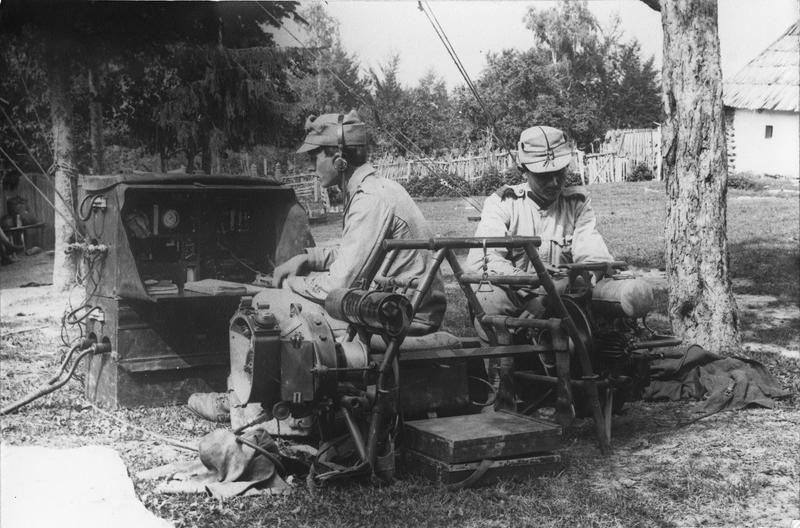
Romanian signallers at a wireless signals post in Tecuci, 1917

A Romanian soldier in an observation post in a trench in Ivești, 1917

Romanian troops in a field kitchen near Ivești, 1917

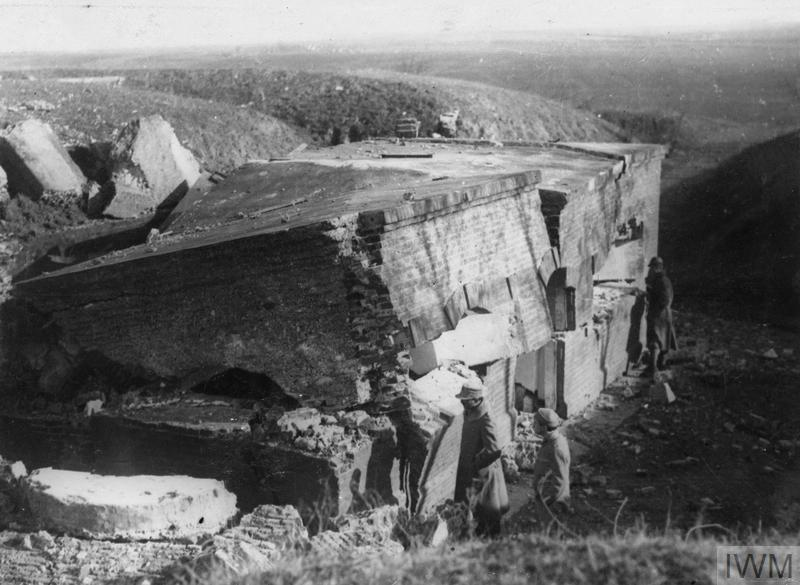
Fortifications of the Focșani–Nămoloasa–Galați line after destruction, 1916
