= Shamkhor massacre =

Massacre during the Russian Civil War

- Location: Şəmkir, Azerbaijan
- Date: 22–25 (9–12 Old Style) January 1918
- Target: Russian military train holding military equipment
- Deaths: Estimates vary from several hundreds to 1,000+
- Injuries: 100+
- Perpetrators: Military Council of Nationalities; Musavat, Tatar Cavalry Regiment

The Shamkhor massacre (Russian: Шамхорская резня) or the Shamkhor incident (Azerbaijani: Şamxor hadisəsi), took place on 22–25 January (9–12 January, Old Style) 1918, Shamkir, Azerbaijan. The Azerbaijani armed groups, acting on orders from the Military Council of Nationalities, massacred Russian soldiers who were returning home from the Caucasus Front, in an effort to obtain sufficient arms.

The Azerbaijani Musavatists and Tatar Cavalry Regiment, under the leadership of the Military Council of Nationalities, stopped a Russian train and demanded the handover of the military supply on it, but the Russian soldiers had refused to give the military equipment away. The following events resulted in the Azerbaijanis storming the train, which led to hundreds of deaths.

== Events ==
After the October Revolution the Imperial Russian Army ceased to exist as an organized force and its soldiers in large numbers moved into Transcaucasia, trying to get home and often terrorized the local population, forcing it to flee. The leaders of Transcaucasian Democratic Federative Republic needed to act quickly to prevent the sacking of cities and the fall of their regime. Therefore, they organized a Military Council of Nationalities in which the Armenians, the Azerbaijanis, and the Georgians were represented.

When a particularly large and militant group of Russian soldiers began to move along the railroad away from the front in January 1918, the Military Council of Nationalities decided to disarm them. The operation was ordered by Noe Ramishvili, the Interior Minister of Transcaucasian Democratic Federative Republic.

A large group of Azerbaijanis had stopped a Russian train near Shamkhor, riding along what is known as the Baku–Tiflis rail line, and demanded the handover of the military supply on the train, but the Russian soldiers had refused to give the military equipment away. It is impossible to determine who fired the first shot, but eventually Azerbaijanis stormed the train, which led to hundreds of deaths. Azerbaijanis had gained significant amount of war equipment after their attack. Thousands of Russian soldiers were disarmed and sent on their way. The events also had angered Bolshevik and Azerbaijani leaders which had led to confrontations later on in that year. The incident at Shamkhor was also followed by organized attacks against Russians throughout the region.

== Casualties ==
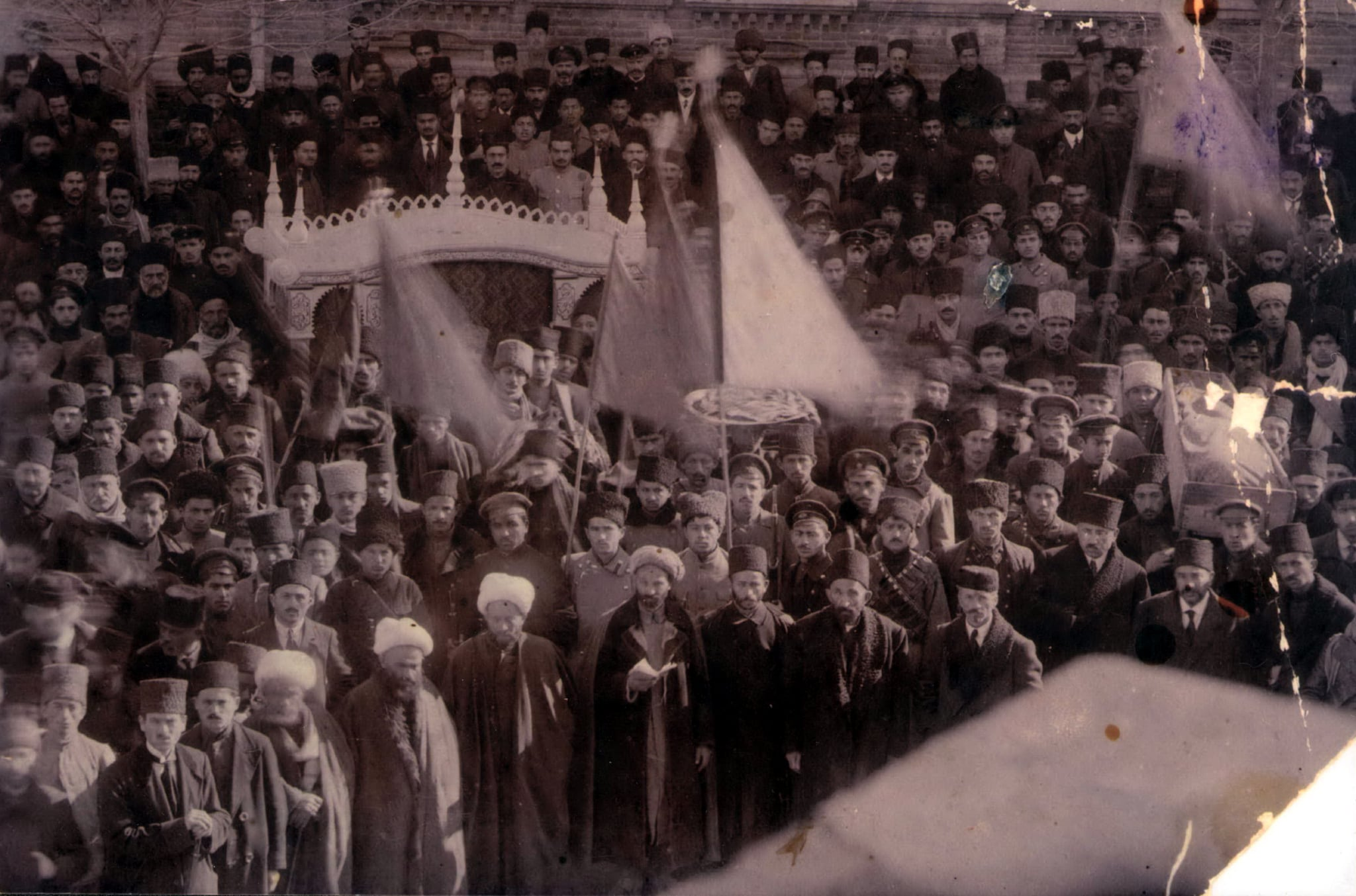
Funeral procession of the martyrs of the Shamkhor massacre in Ganja (Elisabethpol back then)

Various sources indicate that the death toll in the incident ranged from 1000 to over 2,000 Russian soldiers. However, a number of researchers consider these numbers to be clearly overestimated, believing that several hundred Russian soldiers and officers were killed. The number of Russian soldiers killed and wounded remained unknown. According to S.I. Vereshchak, their "number was difficult to establish", since many corpses were burnt and "many were taken away by fellow villagers".

Vladimir Buldakov notes that "the number of those killed and burned alive on both sides was impossible to count." M.A. Volkhonsky and V.M. Mukhanov only note that "the number of victims on both sides was enormous." Other authors indicate that the incident resulted in thousands of people getting killed. I. S. Ratkovsky believes that the total number of those killed and wounded on both sides exceeded 5 thousand people.

== Books ==
- Hovhannisian R. G. Armenia on the Road to Independence, 1918. — Berkeley — Los Angeles: University of California Press, 1967. — 376 p. — ISBN 978-0-520-00574-7
