= Odessa Bolshevik uprising =

1918 rebellion against the Ukrainian People's Republic

Odessa January uprising
- Part of Ukrainian-Soviet War
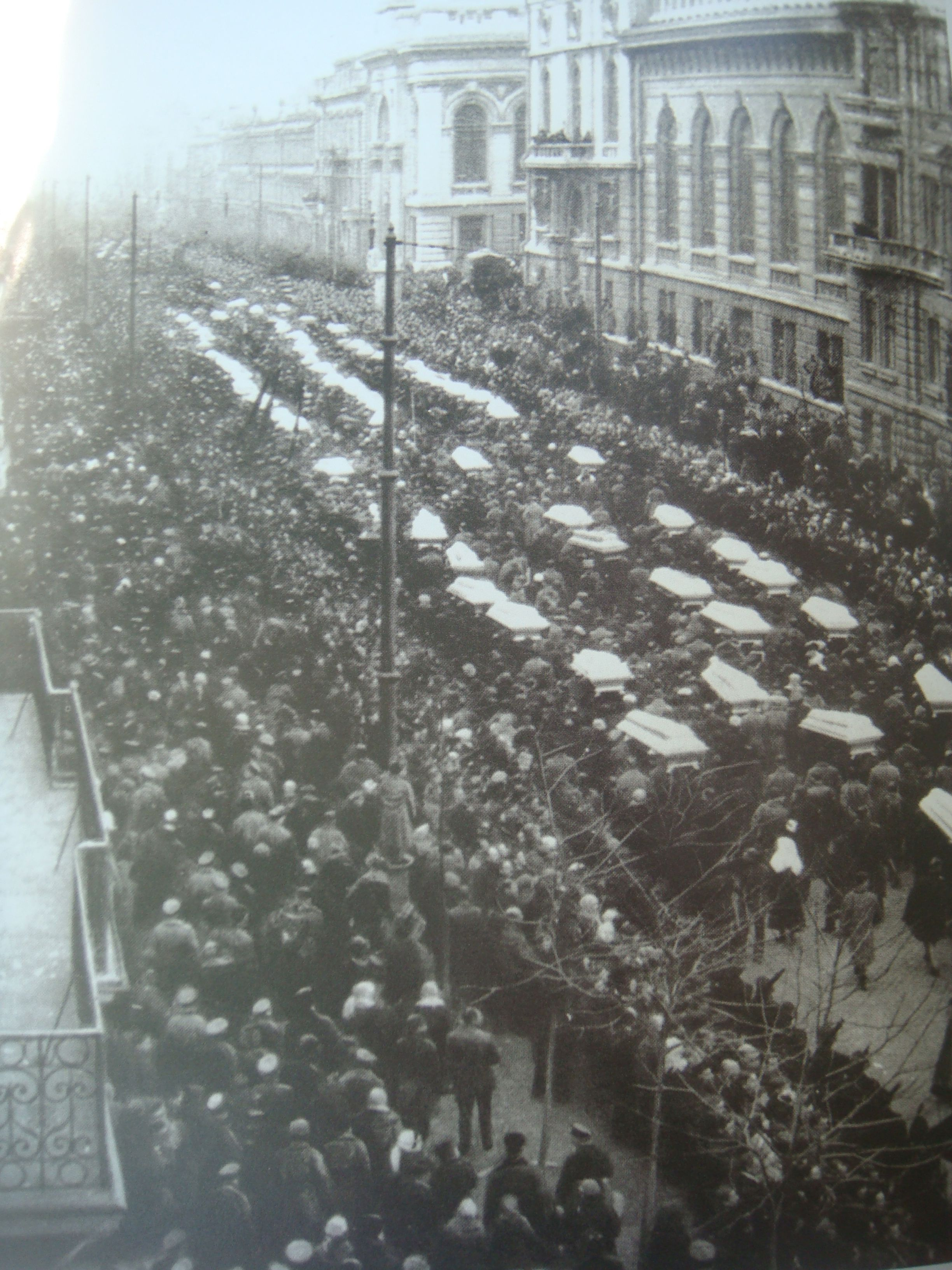
- Funeral of victims of clashes in Odessa, February 1918
Date	27 – 30 January 1918
Location	city of Odessa
Result	Bolshevik victory

Belligerents
Ukrainian People's Republic	(Russian Soviet Federative Socialist Republic) Bolsheviks

Commanders and leaders
Government forces: Volodymyr Poplavko	Rumcherod: Vladimir Yudovsky; Red Guards: Mikhail Muravyov

Units involved
Haidamakas (City garrison); Cadets (Odessa War College)	Red Guards; Okhtyrka Hussars Regiment; 40th Reserve Regiment; 49th Reserve Regiment; Black Sea Fleet

Strength
Up to 2,000 soldiers	4,000 soldiers 3 ships armored train

Casualties and losses
- 180 killed (including around 70 civilians); Up to 350 wounded

The Odessa Bolshevik uprising (Ukrainian: Одеське січневе збройне повстання) was a Bolshevik-led uprising of workers and sailors in Odessa against the government of Ukrainian People's Republic. The rebels were supported by approaching Red Guards forces of Soviet Russia.

== Prelude ==
At the time of February Revolution of 1917 Odessa served as a base for around 100,000 soldiers of the Russian Imperial Army. Following the proclamation of the First Universal of the Ukrainian Central Rada, on 23 July 1,200 soldiers organized a meeting in front of the headquarters of Odessa Military District, demanding Ukrainization of Russian Army units. Their demands were supported by representatives of Ukrainian political parties.

Soon thereafter, the first three Ukrainian units, known as Haidamak kurins, were established from soldiers of Southwestern and Romanian fronts. They were united into a separate Haidamak division led by Marko Mazurenko. By November 1917 the division consisted of 10,000 soldiers. Initially the unit was tasked with the organization of street patrols.

Following the October Revolution, units of Red Guards increased their activity in Odessa. In order to counter them, the city's Central Rada-appointed military commissar Viktor Poplavko issued an order to organize round-the-clock patrols. In December 1917 first clashes emerged between the Haidamaks and Red Guards, during which the commander of the latter was killed. Following that incident, the Bolsheviks organized assassination attempts against Poplavko and Ukrainian activist Ivan Lutsenko.

In December 1917, the 2nd Congress of Rumcherod elected the Bolshevik Executive Committee and adopted a decision on transferring all power to the Soviets. On January 17, 1918 the conference of city factory committees elected the city's military revolutionary committee (the Committee of 15th) which consisted of the Bolsheviks Vladimir Yudovsky (chair), P.Starostin, G.Achkanov, Makar Chizhikov and others. The next day, a conference of representatives of 49 enterprises, soldiers and sailors took place in Odessa, expressing support for the establishment of the Soviet regime.

On 22 January the Fourth Universal of the Ukrainian Central Rada proclaimed independence of the Ukrainian People's Republic amid a Bolshevik offensive on Kyiv. In order to stop the enemy, parts of the Haidamak division were relocated to the areas of Kherson and Mykolaiv, meanwhile many others deserted or joined the Bolshevik side. The Ukrainian People's Army were supported by Gymnasium pupils and students, among them Yurii Lypa. However, Ukrainian forces were numerically inferior to the Red Guards, who enjoyed support of the Black Sea Fleet, left-wing activists and elements of the former 6th Army. The Bolshevik side was also backed by inhabitants of poor urban quarters such as Peresyp, Slobidka and Moldavanka, as well as dock workers. The latter forced the pro-Ukrainian crews of cruiser Pamiat Merkuria and destroyer Zavidny to surrender.

== Uprising ==
On January 27, 1918 the Central Council of Ukraine issued an ultimatum to the Bolsheviks, demanding that they evacuate the buildings of the Military District, railway station and other strategic objectives. The Bolsheviks refused, and on the next day clashed emerged around the city. The rebel forces involved formations of local Red Guards, Okhtyrka Hussars Regiment, 40th and 49th reserve regiments, and other units. The insurgents were supported by the battleships Sinop, Rhostislav and the cruiser Almaz, which housed the headquarters of the uprising and its military tribunal. The Black Sea Fleet ships along with the armored train Zaamurets were part of the approaching expeditionary force led by Muravyov which joined the uprising later.

On January 28, 1918, the Haidamakas recaptured the district's headquarters, rail station and post office. However, the arrival of an armoured train in support of the Bolsheviks gave them a decisive advantage, and on 29 January the Red Guards and revolutionary soldiers and sailors were able to defeat the Ukrainian forces, part of which surrendered on January 30, after which the Soviet regime was established in the city. The remaining Ukrainian troops withdrew from Odessa, but were encountered by the Red Guards and disarmed.

== Aftermath ==
On 31 January the victorious Bolsheviks declared the creation of Odessa Soviet Republic and started purges among the local population. All victims of the fights were buried in a common grave at Kulykove Pole, where a memorial was created. After signing of the Brest-Litovsk Treaty, all Bolshevik forces were driven out of Odessa by 13 March 1918 following an offensive by combined armed forces of the Austro-Hungarian Army, providing support to the Ukrainian People's Republic.
