= Belgium Put the Kibosh on the Kaiser =

Song by Mark Sheridan
- Language: English
- Written: 6 October 1914
- Genre: Novelty song
- Songwriter(s): Alf Ellerton

"Belgium Put the Kibosh on the Kaiser", written and composed by Alf Ellerton, was a popular British patriotic song of the First World War. It was first recorded on 6 October 1914 by Mark Sheridan. The song refers to the 1914 campaign in Belgium when the small British Expeditionary Force, along with an unexpectedly fierce Belgian defence, managed to delay the much larger German army, slowing them and wrecking the Schlieffen Plan which depended on total victory against the French to the west in a matter of weeks. By attacking Belgium, they had violated that nation's neutrality and brought the British Empire into the war because of a pledge to uphold Belgian independence. The song has the metre of "Tramp! Tramp! Tramp!".

== Reception ==
The song had an early spike in popularity, but fell out of favour after early 1915.

== In popular culture ==
It was featured in the stage musical (1963) and musical film (1969) Oh! What a Lovely War.

== Lyrics ==
A silly German sausage
Dreamt Napoleon he'd be,
Then he went and broke his promise,
It was made in Germany.
He shook hands with Britannia
And eternal peace he swore,
Naughty boy, he talked of peace
While he prepared for war.

He stirred up little Serbia
To serve his dirty tricks
But naughty nights at Liege
Quite upset this Dirty Dick.
His luggage labelled 'England'
And his programme nicely set,
He shouted 'First stop Paris',
But he hasn't got there yet.

For Belgium put the kibosh on the Kaiser;
Europe took the stick and made him sore;
On his throne it hurts to sit,
And when John Bull starts to hit,
He will never sit upon it any more.

His warships sailed upon the sea,
They looked a pretty sight
But when they heard the bulldog bark
They disappeared from sight.
The Kaiser said 'Be careful,
If by Jellicoe they're seen,
Then every man-of-war I've got
Will be a submarine'.

We chased his ship to Turkey,
And the Kaiser startled stood,
Schratch'd his head and said 'Don't hurt,
You see I'm touching wood';
Then Turkey brought her warships
Just to aid the German plot,
Be careful, Mr Turkey,
Or you'll do the Turkey Trot.

Belgium put the kibosh on the Kaiser;
Europe took the stick and made him sore;
And if Turkey makes a stand
She'll get gurkha'd and japanned,
And it won't be Hoch the Kaiser any more.

He'll have to go to school again
And learn his geography,
He quite forgot Britannia
And the hands across the sea,
Australia and Canada,
the Russian and the Jap,
And England looked so small
He couldn't see her on the map.

Whilst Ireland seemed unsettled,
'Ah' said he 'I'll settle John',
But he didn't know the Irish
Like he knew them later on.
Though the Kaiser stirred the lion,
Please excuse him for the crime,
His lunatic attendant
Wasn't with him at the time.

For Belgium put the kibosh on the Kaiser;
Europe took the stick and made him sore;
We shall shout with victory's joy,
Hold your hand out, naughty boy,
You must never play at soldiers any more.

For Belgium put the kibosh on the Kaiser;
Europe took the stick and made him sore;
On his throne it hurts to sit,
And when John Bull starts to hit,
He will never sit upon it any more.
