= Mark Sheridan =

British comedian

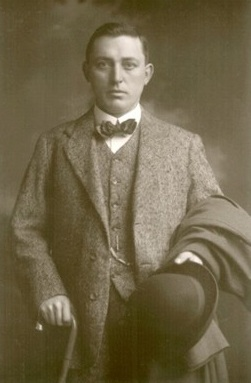
Mark Sheridan

Mark Sheridan (11 September 1864 – 15 January 1918), born Frederick Shaw, was an English music hall comedian and singer. He became a popular performer of lusty seaside songs and originated the J. Glover-Kind classic, "I Do Like to Be Beside the Seaside" in 1909. He recorded more than fifty songs during a ten-year period, including "One of the Bhoys" (1910), "Belgium Put the Kibosh on the Kaiser" (1914) and "I'd Like to Shake Shakespeare" (1915). He was also a major presence in pantomime productions throughout the British Isles during his later career.

Sheridan was born in Hendon, Sunderland, County Durham, and initially worked on the Sunderland docks before being employed at the Newcastle-upon-Tyne Theatre, where he took up amateur dramatics. To progress his stage career, he secured engagements in Europe and South Africa in 1890, and performed in Australia two years later. In 1895 he returned to London and entered the vibrant scene of English music hall and became a leading performer on the circuit. In 1909 he first performed what was to become his most famous song "I Do Like to Be Beside the Seaside", which he later recorded.

In 1917, Sheridan wrote and composed the musical burlesque, Gay Paree, which he performed with a London theatre company and later toured the northern provinces including Scotland. His career took a decline in later years and he suffered severe depression, as a result. He died by suicide in Kelvingrove Park, Glasgow in 1918 aged 53. He is buried in Cathcart Cemetery, near Glasgow.

== Biography ==
=== Early life and career ===
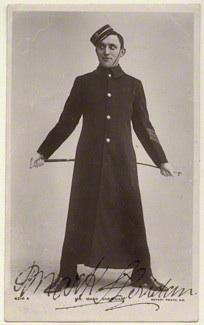
Sheridan on stage in 1907

Sheridan was born Frederick Shaw to Scottish-Irish parents in Hendon, Sunderland, County Durham and began working with his father, a sail maker, on the Sunderland docks. He progressed from there to working in the back offices of the Newcastle-upon-Tyne Theatre for four years between 1877 and 1881. There, he became interested in performing and took up amateur dramatics. Sheridan decided to shorten his name to Fred as this was a popular name on the music hall circuit. He later changed his name again when he moved from amateur dramatics to the professional theatre and decided upon Mark Sheridan. He took the first name from the American writer and humorist Mark Twain and used his Irish mother's maiden surname, Sheridan.

His early experiences in variety shows were mainly in Europe, followed by performances in South Africa in 1890, where he went after his marriage to Ethel Maude Davenport. Two years later, he travelled to Australia and appeared on the Harry Rickards circuit, where he started a double act with his wife called "The Sheridans". He arrived back in London with his wife in 1895 but dissolved the double act with her. He was engaged to appear at the Standard Music Hall, Pimlico, the same year. From there he became a regular on the London music hall circuit, and quickly built up a reputation as one of the most popular music hall comedians of the time. Sheridan made frequent appearances on the same bill as Marie Lloyd, Little Tich, Dan Leno and George Robey. As well as his comedy sketches, he became a successful singer and enjoyed his biggest success in 1909 with "I Do Like to Be Beside the Seaside". This led to performances as a principal boy in countless pantomimes across the country and further recordings, including "One of the Bhoys" (1910), "Belgium Put the Kibosh on the Kaiser" (1914), "Here We Are Again" (1914) and "I'd Like to Shake Shakespeare" (1915).

=== Later career and death ===
In 1915, Sheridan starred in the comic revue Winkles, which later toured the northern provinces. As music hall was on the decline with audiences, Sheridan concentrated on revue. During his later years, he believed that his popularity was waning and was plagued by deep insecurities and depression.

In 1917, Sheridan returned to Glasgow where he had enjoyed some of his earliest successes. He wrote and personally financed Gay Paree, a musical burlesque show based on W. G. Wills West End favourite, A Royal Divorce. It cost Sheridan £2,000 and had a London company of 40 people, including two of his children, Billy and Fred. On 14 January 1918, Gay Paree opened at the Coliseum in Glasgow, in which Sheridan played the part of Napoleon. Gay Paree received negative reviews from both its audiences and newspaper critics. Sheridan's performance was considered by critics to be less successful than his earlier music hall performances.

Devastated by the critics' reviews for Gay Paree, Sheridan entered Kelvingrove Park on 15 January 1918 and killed himself with a single gunshot to the head. The coroner recorded a verdict of suicide, since the gun found had belonged to Sheridan. He was buried in Cathcart Cemetery on 18 January 1918, leaving his wife Maude, their three sons Billy, Fred and Jack, and two daughters Francis and Freda. He is commemorated by a pink granite gravestone.

== Selected recordings ==
- At The Football Match Last Saturday – 14 September 1905
- They All Come Out in the Summertime – 14 September 1905
- Josser Cricketer – October 1909
- I Do Like To be Beside the Seaside – October 1909
- Story From the Chestnut Tree – October 1909
- When the lights are low – 19 April 1910
- Hear What the Crowds Say – 19 April 1910
- One of the B'hoys – 25 October 1910
- By the Sea – 25 October 1910
- Fancy Meeting You at the Isle of Man – 25 October 1910
- Who's Who – 25 November 1910
- I Met Everybody I knew – 25 May 1911
- Prison Up to Date – 25 May 1911
- Let's all go home together – 27 September 1911
- The Esplanade – 27 September 1911
- The Three Trees – 27 September 1911
- I Wanted a Wife – 25 November 1911
- They All Walk the Wibbly-Wobbly Walk – November 1912
- Who Were You With Last Night? – November 1912
- The Mother and the Child Were There – November 1912
- Belgium Put the Kibosh on the Kaiser – October 1914
- Pack Up Your Troubles – January 1915
- I'd Like To Shake Shakespeare – March 1915
- It's Girls That Make The Seaside – March 1915

== Sources ==
- Mellor, G. J. (1970). The Northern Music Hall. Newcastle-upon-Tune: Frank Graham. ISBN 0900409851.
