= I Do Like to Be Beside the Seaside =

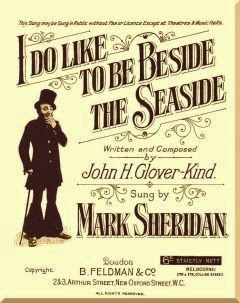

Song by Mark Sheridan
- Published: 1907
- Recorded: original 1909
- Genre: Music hall
- Songwriter: John H. Glover-Kind

"I Do Like to Be Beside the Seaside" is a popular British music hall song. It was written in 1907 by John H. Glover-Kind (1880 – 1918) and made famous by music hall singer Mark Sheridan, who first recorded it in 1909. It speaks of the singer's love for the seaside and his wish to return there for his summer holidays each year. It was composed at a time when the yearly visits of the British working class to the seaside were booming. It is catalogued as Roud Folk Song Index No. 32459.

It was used as a signature tune for a long time by Reginald Dixon MBE, who was the resident organist at the Tower Ballroom, Blackpool between 1930 and 1970.

== Lyrics ==
Everyone delights to spend their summer's holiday
down beside the side of the silvery sea.
I'm no exception to the rule, in fact, if I'd my way,
I'd reside by the side of the silvery sea.

But when you're just the common garden Smith or Jones or Brown,
At business up in town, you've got to settle down.
You save up all the money you can till summer comes around
Then away you go to a spot you know where the cockleshells are found

Oh! I do like to be beside the seaside!
I do like to be beside the sea!
Oh I do like to stroll along the Prom, Prom, Prom!
Where the brass bands play, "Tiddely-om-pom-pom!"

So just let me be beside the seaside!
I'll be beside myself with glee
and there's lots of girls beside,
I should like to be beside, beside the seaside,
beside the sea!

Timothy went to Blackpool for the day last Eastertide
To see what he could see by the side of the sea.
As soon as he reached the station there the first thing he espied
Was the wine lodge door stood open invitingly
To quench his thirst, he toddled inside and called out for a wine
Which grew to eight or nine, till his nose began to shine.
Said he 'What people see in the sea, I'm sure I fail to see'
Then he caught the train back home again and to his wife said he

Oh! I do like to be beside the seaside!
I do like to be beside the sea!
Oh I do like to stroll along the Prom, Prom, Prom!
Where the brass bands play, "Tiddely-om-pom-pom!"

So just let me be beside the seaside!
I'll be beside myself with glee
and there's lots of girls beside,
I should like to be beside, beside the seaside,
beside the sea!

William Sykes the burglar he'd been out to work one night
filled his bags with jewels, cash and plate.
Constable Brown felt quite surprised when William hove in sight.
Said he, "The hours you're keeping are far too late."
So he grabbed him by the collar and lodged him safe and sound in jail.
Next morning looking pale, Bill told a tearful tale.
The judge said, "For a couple of months I'm sending you away!"
Said Bill, "How kind! Well if you don't mind, Where I spend my holiday!"

Oh! I do like to be beside the seaside!
I do like to be beside the sea!
For the sun's always shining as I make my way,
And the brass bands play, "Ta-ra-ra-boom-de-ay"

So just let me be beside the seaside!
I'll be beside myself with glee
and there's lots of girls beside,
I should like to be beside, beside the seaside,
beside the sea!

== References in culture ==
- Cavalcade (1933), starring Diana Wynyard and Clive Brook, shows the song being performed by seaside entertainers in a scene set in 1909.
- Sylvia Scarlett (1935), starring Katharine Hepburn and Cary Grant.
- Bank Holiday (1938), starring Margaret Lockwood and Hugh Williams. The tune is used as a theme several times during the film.
- The Adventures of Sherlock Holmes (1939), starring Basil Rathbone, involves a heavily disguised Holmes singing the song. An anachronism, as the film was set in 1894 thirteen years before the song was written.
- Mr. Moto's Last Warning (1939), starring Peter Lorre and George Sanders. The antagonist's (Ricardo Cortez) ventriloquism act features a dummy singing the song while he drinks a glass of water and smokes a cigarette.
- Carry On... Follow That Camel (1967): when the foreign legionnaires become lost in the North African desert they sing the song.
- Oh What a Lovely War (1969) features a pierside scene where Sir Douglas Haig is trying to recruit for the First World War, with the words of the song changed to "I do to like to see a lot of soldiers".
- The Doctor Who episodes Death to the Daleks and The Leisure Hive feature the song. In the first it was sung by the Doctor (Jon Pertwee) while in the second it was part of the music score of the episode.
- The opening two sentences in the chorus are included at the end of the song "Seven Seas of Rhye" (1974) from Queen.
- The Goodies episode "Holidays" (1982) features the song as part of the "Victorian musical evening", at first sung only by Tim Brooke-Taylor, before Graeme Garden and Bill Oddie join in, and it becomes a punk rock song.
- An Awfully Big Adventure (1994), starring Hugh Grant and Alan Rickman, includes a scene where two theatre troupes sing the chorus of the song while riding a bus to a football game.
- In The Hoobs episode "Holidays", The Motorettes sing the song.
- NCIS Season 7 Episode 18 (2010), starring David McCallum, includes a scene where he is walking by the seaside singing the song.
- In Grand Theft Auto: The Lost and Damned the song is sung near the end of "Off Route" mission by cannibalistic serial killer Curtis Stocker.
- The Thomas & Friends Series 18 episode "Thomas the Quarry Engine" (2014) ends with Mavis, Salty, Cranky, Thomas and Porter singing the song. It is also sung in the Series 19 episode "Toad and the Whale" (2015). An instrumental version is heard in "Thomas & Friends in 4-D: Bubbling Boilers" (2016) on Mr. Bubbles' bubble machine. In the YouTube video "Meet the Steam Team: Rebecca" (2019), she and Gordon sang a parody of the song called "It's Lovely to Pull the Great Express Train".
- In the Hey Duggee Series 2 episode "The Fossil Badge" (2017), a seashell character sings a few lines from the song.
- Mr. Bean episodes "Holiday for Teddy" and "A Magic Day Out", Mr. Bean sings the song.
- In the Bluey episode "Dad Baby" (Episode 13, Season 2, 2020) Bluey's neighbor Wendy is singing the song while watering her plants in her yard.
- The Vicar of Dibley, Geraldine (played by Dawn French), sings the chorus while intoxicated in the "Merry Christmas" episode (2004).
- In Outlander, Claire Fraser sings a few lines from the song to her stillborn child, Faith, in episode 207, "Faith" (2016). In Episode 716, "A Hundred Thousand Angels" (2025), Fanny sings part of the song to herself, and a recording of the song is heard during the closing credits of that episode.
- In BBC drama series Call the Midwife, Trixie Franklin, played by Helen George, sings the song while driving to the beach in series 13, episode 5 (2024), set in 1969.
- The song "Regular" by the band Badfinger features Joey Molland singing two lines from the song during the fade out.
- The punk band The Sex Pistols incorporated this tune on stage in 2008.
- In the Rainbow episode "The Seaside Show" (1991), the characters sing the song as part of their show.
- The song has been used as an entrance theme by professional wrestler William Regal.
- The song features heavily in The Monkey, in which it is the tune played by the titular, drum-playing monkey before it causes the death of someone around it.
- The character Harold Wilson sings an excerpt from the song in Made in Dagenham, during the Act II number "Viva Eastbourne".
