= Vika IF =

Norwegian sports club from Oslo

Vika Idrettsforening (Vika Sports Association) (founded on 26 January 1918) is a Norwegian sports club from Oslo, normally simply called Vika. The association currently operates only with waterpolo. Previously there were several other sports part of the association such as boxing, football, athletics, handball, hockey, cycling and above all swimming. The members of the swimming team have won almost 400 Norwegian championships over the years. Today the waterpolo club is part of the Norwegian Swimming Federation, the Oslo Sport Group and Oslo Swimming Group.
