= Native American policy of the Grant administration =

Unsuccessful 19th-century US policy of reconciliation with Native Americans

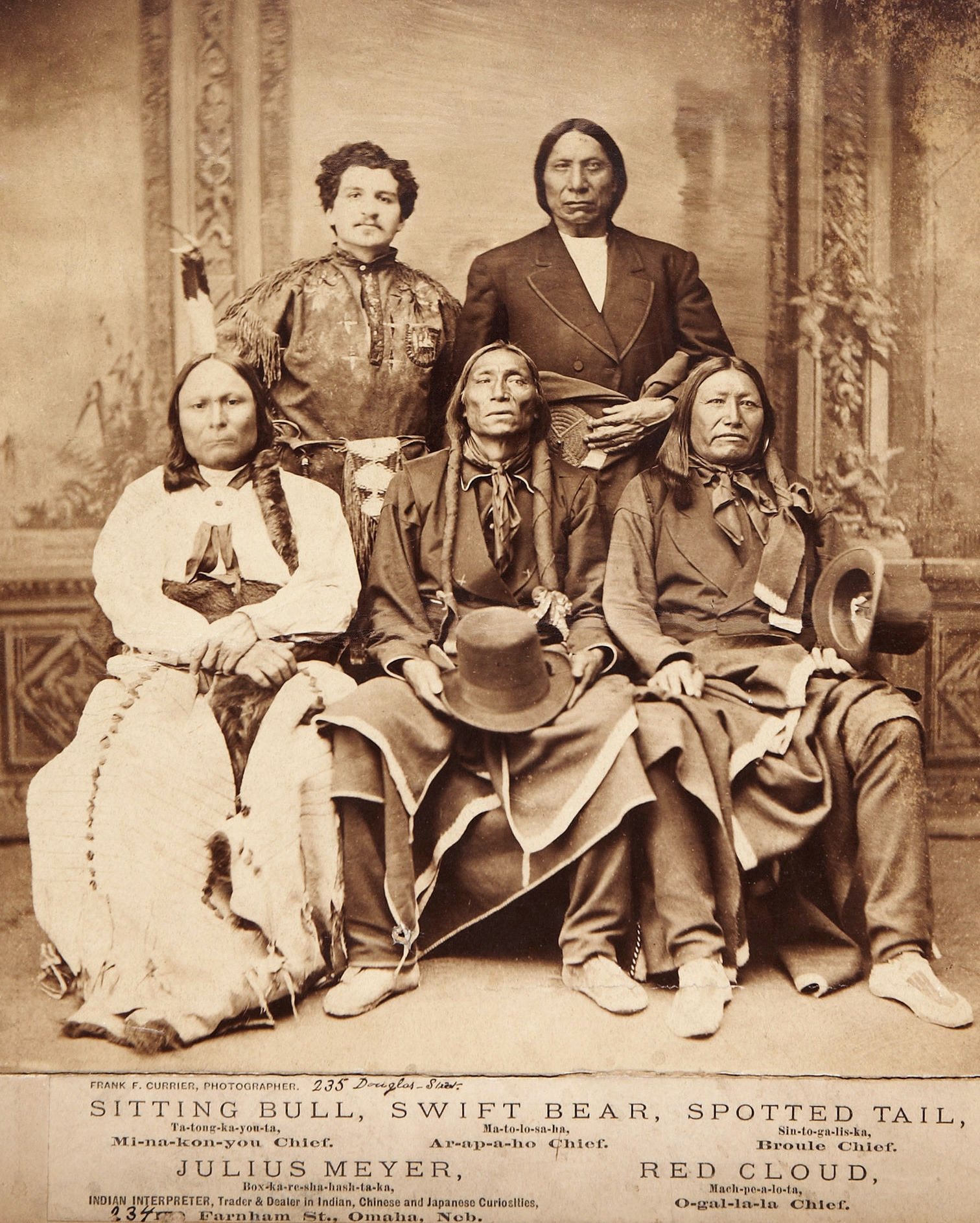
Native Chiefs: (Bottom L-R), Sitting Bull, Swift Bear, Spotted Tail (Top R) Red Cloud En route to Washington D.C. to plea President Grant to honor the Fort Laramie Treaty and keep the Black Hills. Interpreter: (Top L) Julius Meyer Frank F. Courier May 1875

President Ulysses S. Grant sympathized with the plight of Native Americans and believed that the original occupants of the land were worthy of study. Grant's Inauguration Address set the tone for the Grant administration Native American Peace policy. The Board of Indian Commissioners was created to make reforms in Native policy and to ensure Native tribes received federal help. Grant lobbied the United States Congress to ensure that Native peoples would receive adequate funding. The hallmark of Grant's Peace policy was the incorporation of religious groups that served on Native agencies, which were dispersed throughout the United States.

Grant was the first President of the United States to appoint a Native American, Ely S. Parker, as the Commissioner of Indian Affairs. After the Piegan massacre, in 1870, military officers were barred from holding elected or appointed offices. During Grant's first term, American Indian Wars decreased. By the end of his second term, his Peace policy fell apart. Settlers demanded to invade Native land to get access to gold in the Black Hills. The Modoc War (1872–1873) and the Battle of the Little Bighorn (1876), were detrimental to Grant's goal of enforced Native assimilation to European American culture and society.

Historians admire Grant's sincere efforts to improve Native relations in the United States but remain critical of the destruction of buffalo herds, which served as a tribal food supply. Native American culture was destroyed in order to engineer the cultural assimilation of Native Americans into citizenship, and European American culture and government. Detrimental to his Peace policy was religious agency infighting in addition to Parker's resignation in 1871. Grant's intentions of peacefully "civilizing" Natives were often in conflict with the nation's westward settlement, the pursuit of gold, the Long Depression (1873-1896), financial corruption, racism, and ranchers. The driving force behind the Peace policy and Native land displacement, was the American ideal of Manifest Destiny. The primary goal of Grant's Indian policy was to have Native Americans assimilated into white culture, education, language, religion, and citizenship, that was designed to break Indian reliance on their own tribal, nomadic, hunting, and religious lifestyles. Some Grant biographers argue that Grant’s Indian policies were well-intentioned, while others argue his assimilationist policies were rooted in destroying Native American culture in the fulfilment of Manifest Destiny.

== Grant's early contact with Native Americans (1850s) ==
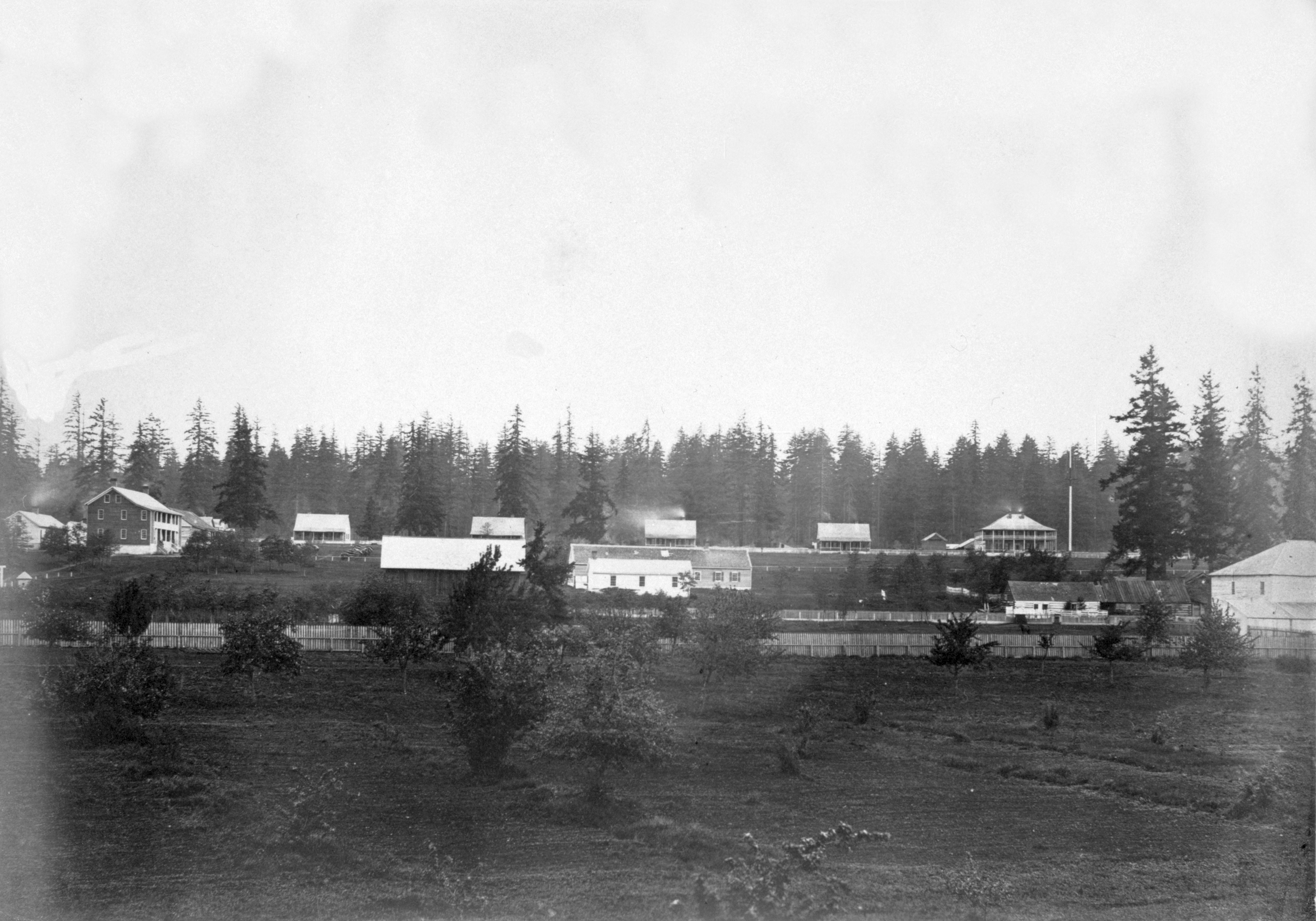
Fort Vancouver 1859

During his 1850s military service in the Pacific Northwest, Grant served in the Fourth Infantry stationed at Columbia Barracks, afterwards renamed Fort Vancouver (July, 1853), in the Oregon Territory. Grant told his wife Julia, who feared violence from the Native Americans, that they were a "harmless" people. Sympathetic with the plight of Native Americans, Grant believed they would remain peaceful had they not been "put upon" by whites. In this way Grant sympathized with the Native groups, which were being devastated by small pox spread by white settlers.

== First term (1869–1873) ==
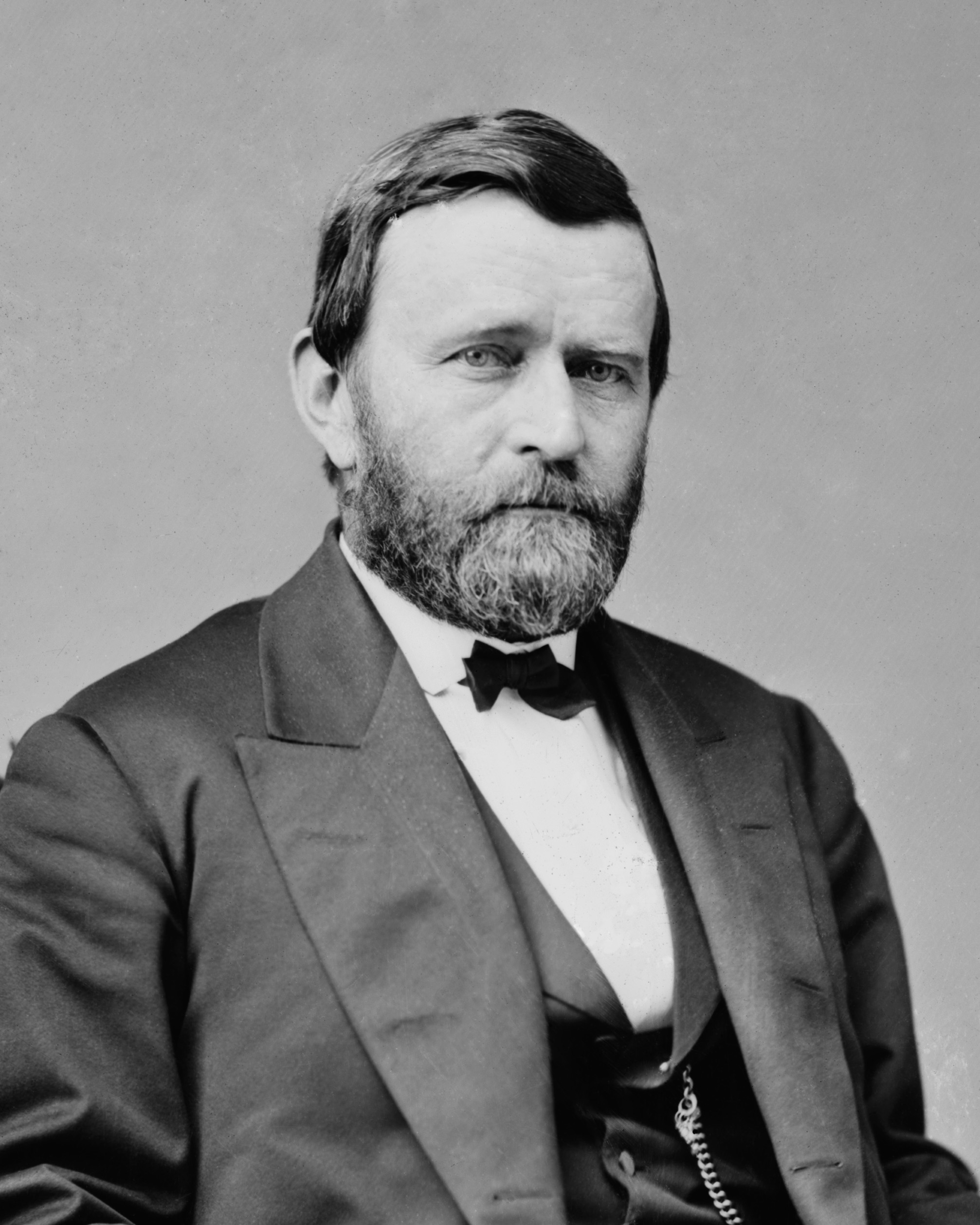
President Grant Mathew Brady 1870

President Grant declared in his March 4, 1869, Inaugural Address:

"The proper treatment of the original occupants of this land--the Indians one deserving of careful study. I will favor any course toward them which tends to their civilization and ultimate citizenship."

Grant believed that the Native practice of free roam hunting and gathering was over. During Grant's presidency the "civilization" of Indians was a controversial issue. Grant was the first President to advocate the cause of Native Americans in an Inaugural Address. Grant was well aware that Americans were generally hostile to Native peoples.

Grant's promise to reform the nation's Native American policy surprised the nation. Three weeks into his administration, Grant met with religious leaders and philanthropists to discuss his new program. Grant said he desired to create a "humane and Christianizing policy towards the Indians." The New York Herald said that Grant planned "to make a radical change in the Indian policy of the government." Wendell Phillips, a civil rights advocate, thanked Grant for launching a new Native policy.

The Leavenworth Bulletin, hostile to Grant's Peace initiative, said: "If more men are to be scalped and their hearts boiled, we hope to God that it may be some of our Quaker Indian Agents." Unlike many of his military subordinates, Grant blamed frontier Native violence on the white settlement, and supported a Peace Commission rather than wage a "campaign against Indians."

Soon after Grant took office, he met with tribal chiefs of the Choctaw, Creek, Cherokee, and Chickasaw nations who expressed interest to teach "wild" Natives outside their own settled districts farming skills. Grant told the Native chiefs that American settlement would lead to inevitable conflict, but that the "march to civilization" would lead to pacification.

At the core of the Peace Policy was to put the western reservations under the control of religious denominations. During his first term, the implementation of the policy involved the allotting of Indian reservations to religious organizations as exclusive religious domains. Of the 73 agencies assigned, the Methodists received fourteen; the Orthodox Friends ten; the Presbyterians nine; the Episcopalians eight; the Roman Catholics seven; the Hicksite Friends six; the Baptists five; the Dutch Reformed five; the Congregationalists three; Christians two; Unitarians two; American Board of Commissioners for Foreign Missions one; and Lutherans one. Infighting between competitive missionary groups over the distribution of agencies was detrimental to Grant's Peace Policy. The selection criteria were vague and some critics saw the Peace Policy as violating Native American freedom of religion.

=== Board of Indian Commissioners (1869) ===
On April 10, 1869, Grant signed into law the Board of Indian Commissioners. There was resistance toward its passage because Congressional patronage power over appointments would be reduced. The act gave President Grant the power to create a board of Commissioners "eminent for their intelligence and philanthropy." Grant was determined to put in public service-minded men, not subject to being influenced by patronage, that had previously plagued the Indian Bureau. Grant secured $2,000,000 more in the annual appropriation to make sure that Board would be funded adequately and be successful. Grant invited Protestant religious groups that included Methodists, Presbyterians, Episcopalians, Congregationalists, and Quakers to nominate agents to work with the Native tribes. To bypass legal concerns regarding the separation between church and state, Grant refused to ask his Attorney General Hoar for a legal opinion on the matter.

On May 27, 1869, representatives of religious denominations met with Grant and approved of his Board appointments, who were mandated by the law to inspect Indian Bureau records, to personally visit tribes, evaluate the treaty system, and to supervise Indian purchases.

On July 3, 1869, Grant authorized by executive order the Indian Board to "have full power to inspect in person or by a subcommittee, the various Indian Superintendencies, and Agencies in the Indian Country." The Grant Board was given extensive joint-power to supervise the Bureau of Indian Affairs and "civilize" Native Americans. No Natives were appointed to the committee, whose members were all white. The commission monitored purchases and began to inspect Native agencies. It attributed much of the Native wars to the encroachment of whites into Native lands. The board, however, approved of the destruction of Native culture to be replaced by European American culture. The Natives were to be instructed in Christianity, agriculture, representative government, and assimilated on reservations.

In December 1869, Grant gave his first annual message to Congress, and he mentioned findings and recommendations of the new Indian Commissioners board. Concerning Native wars, Grant said that he "did not hold, either legislation or the conduct of the whites who come most in contact with the Indian, blameless for these hostilities." Grant thought that the extinction of the Natives would be horrible. Grant said that a policy "which looks to the extinction of a race is too abhorant [sic] for a Nation to indulge in without entailing upon the wrath of all civilized Christendom." There was an edgy sense of optimism in Grant's outlook for Native Americans.

=== Appointment of Parker (1869) ===
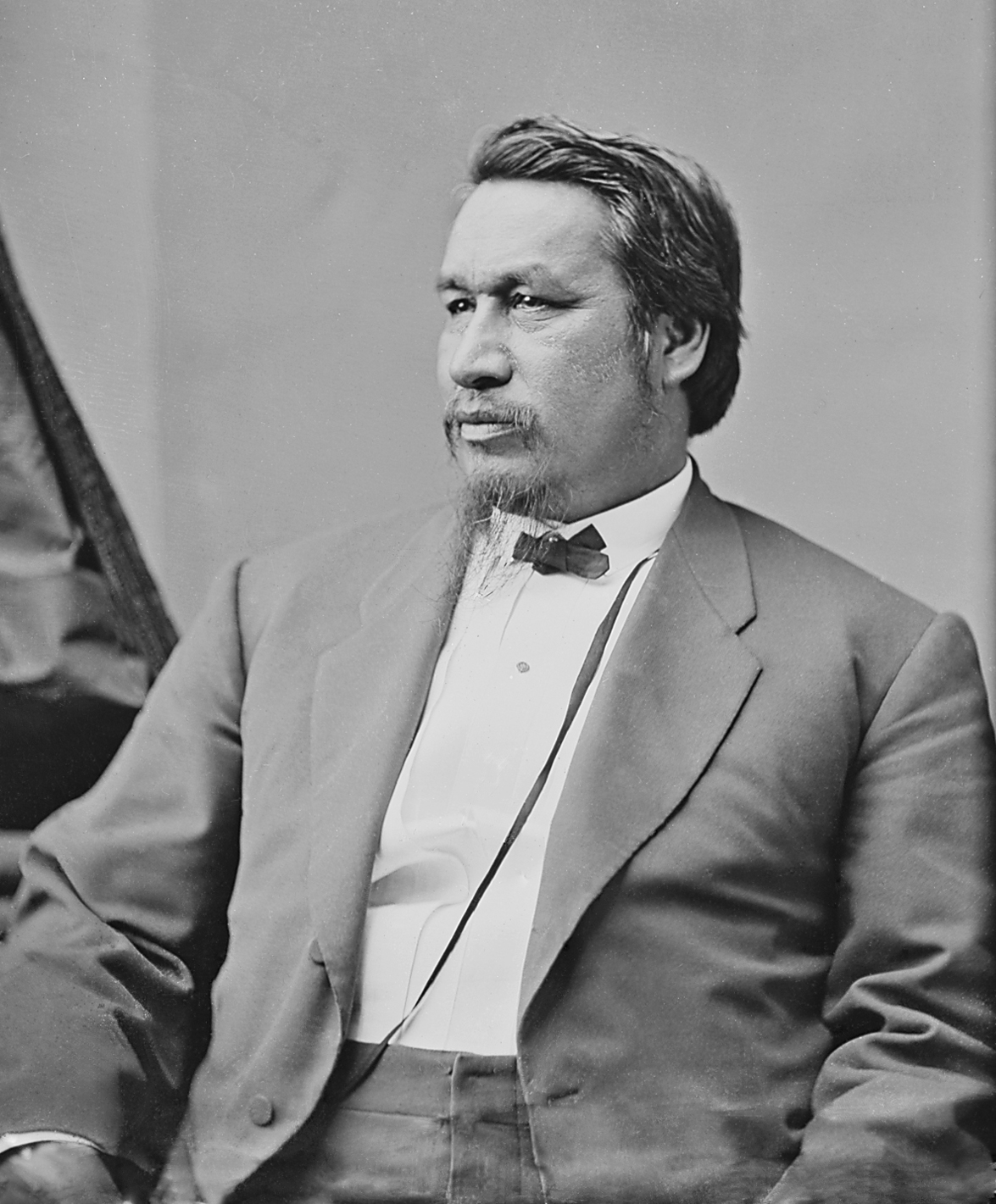
Ely S. Parker Donehogawa

On April 13, 1869, in a bold step, Grant appointed his aide General Ely S. Parker, Donehogawa, the first Native American Commissioner of Indian Affairs. Parker was Grant's military secretary during the Civil War. Parker, who was a full Seneca Native, received racial prejudice opposition in the Senate to his nomination. However, Grant's Attorney General Hoar said Parker was legally able to hold office. Grant believed that the Native Americans, when educated, could work within white society in modern America, and Parker served as Grant's role model. The Senate confirmed Parker by a vote of 36 to 12. During Parker's tenure Native wars dropped by 43 from 101 in 1869 to 58 in 1870. Plains Indians found it difficult to believe a literate "red man" be appointed to "Little Father" that always had gone to a white man.

The management of Native affairs was delegated by Grant to the Secretary of Interior Jacob D. Cox and Parker. Parker authorized the Indian Board Commissioners to meet with Native peoples and their agents during the summer and fall. The Bureau under Parker employed more than six hundred workers. A total of seventy agents were under the control of fifteen superintendents.

William Welsh, a prominent merchant, and former chairman of the Board of Indian Commissioners launched a personal campaign against Commissioner of Indian Affairs Parker to remove him from office, possibly motivated by racial animus. Welsh was allowed by Congress to prosecute the Bureau in a Congressional investigation over alleged Bureau malfeasance. Although Parker was exonerated, legislation passed Congress that authorized the board to approve goods and services payments by vouchers from the Bureau. Parker refused to abide by the voucher legislation and resigned office in 1871. Parker viewed the new law made the office of Commissioner a "clerk" to the board. Grant replaced Parker with reformer Francis A. Walker.

=== Piegan massacre (1870) ===
On January 23, 1870, the Grant administration's Peace Policy had a major setback when Major Edward M. Baker senselessly slaughtered 173 Piegan members, mostly women, and children. General Sheridan had ordered Baker to attack the Piegan warriors who raided European American settlements. In response, Baker attacked a Native village in Northern Montana on the Marias River. Gruesome details slowly emerged of the carnage: 30 Native warriors and 140 women and children were butchered outright. Philanthropist newspapers decried the violence. The New York Times said Baker's war was a "sickening slaughter," while the New York Tribune said the attack was a "national disgrace." Worse yet, the National Anti-Slavery Society blamed one of Grant's top generals, Sheridan, for starting the fight.

Additionally, public outcry increased when General Sheridan defended Baker's actions. In response, on July 15, 1870, Grant signed Congressional legislation that barred military officers from holding either elected or appointed office or suffer dismissal from the Army. In December 1870, Grant submitted to Congress the names of the new appointees, most of whom were confirmed by the Senate.

=== Appropriations Acts (1870, 1871) ===
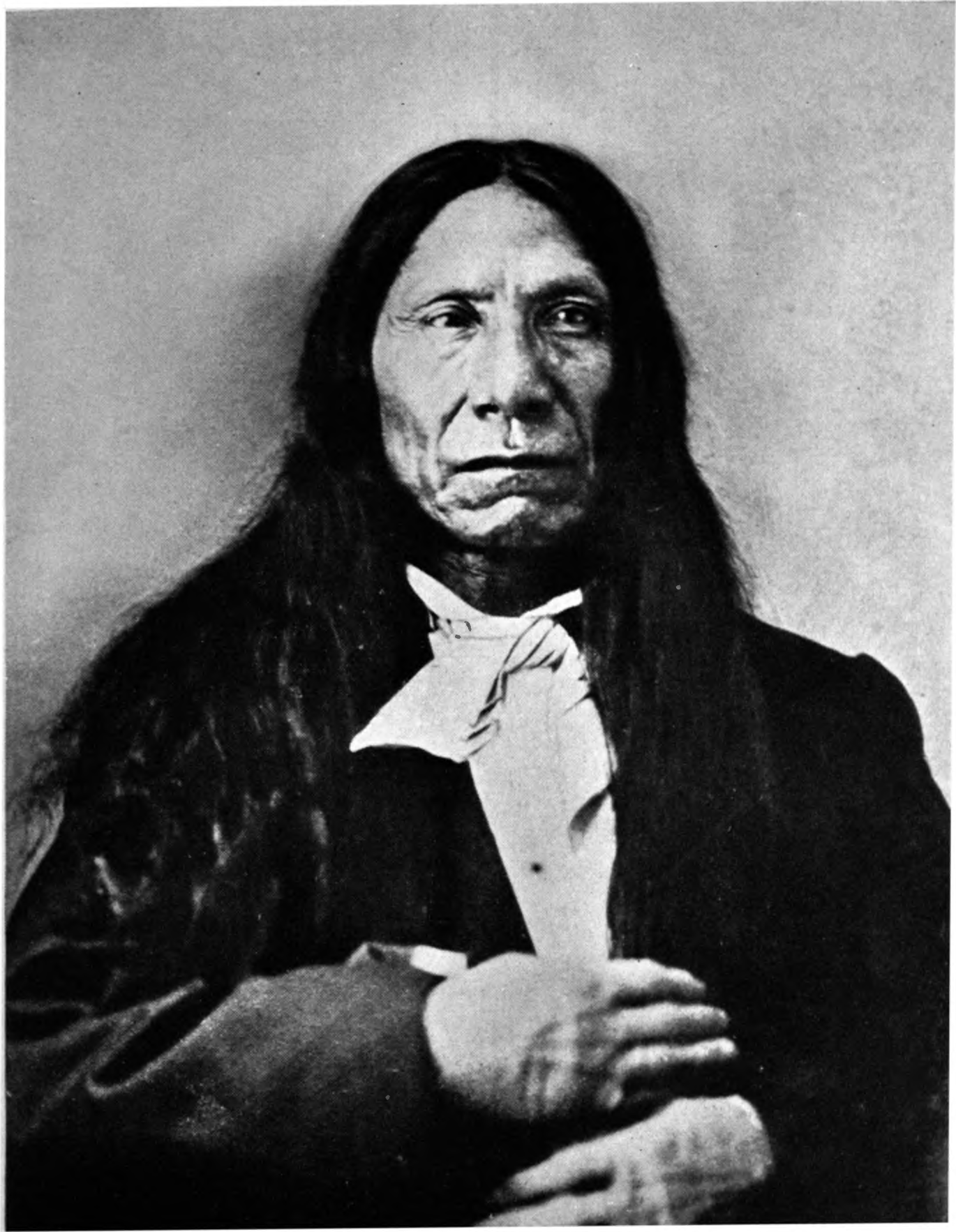
Red Cloud Maȟpíya Lúta

Grant's Peace policy received a boost when Chief of the Oglala Sioux Red Cloud, Maȟpíya Lúta, and Brulé Sioux Spotted Tail, Siŋté Glešká, arrived in Washington D.C. and met Grant at the White House for a bountiful state dinner on May 7, 1870. Red Cloud, at a previous meeting with Secretary Cox and Commissioner Parker, complained that promised rations and arms for hunting had not been delivered. Afterward, Grant and Cox lobbied Congress for the promised supplies and rations. Congress responded by passing the Indian Appropriations Act, which appropriated the tribal monies, and Grant signed it into law on July 15, 1870. Two days after Spotted Tail urged the Grant administration to keep white settlers from invading Native reservation land, Grant ordered all Generals in the West to "keep intruders off by military force if necessary". In 1871, Grant signed another Indian Appropriations Act that ended the governmental policy of treating tribes as independent sovereign nations. Natives would be treated as individuals or wards of the state and Indian policies would be legislated by Congressional statutes.

=== Camp Grant massacre (1871) ===
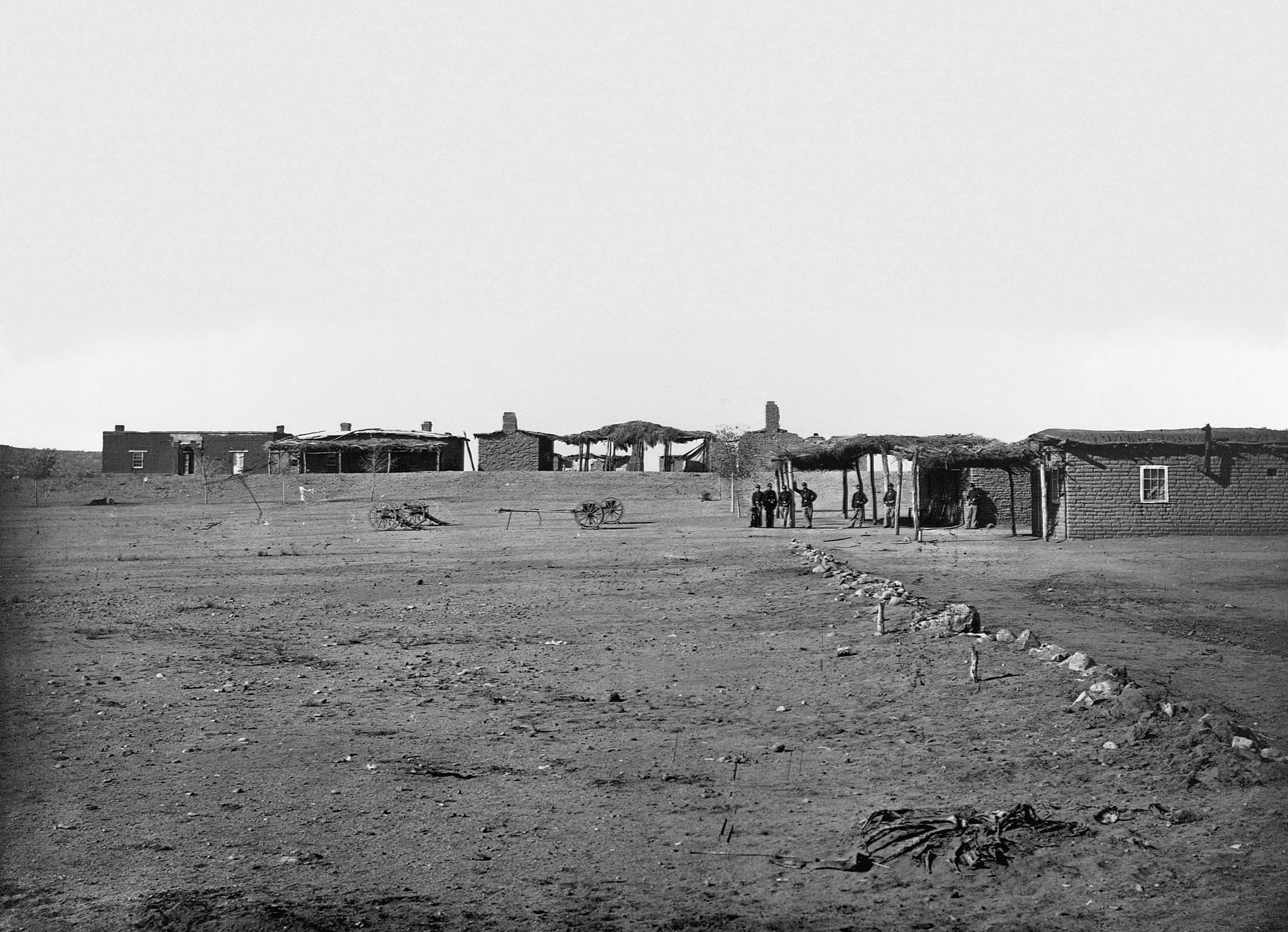
Camp Grant

In 1871, Grant's Indian peace policy, enforced and coordinated by Brig. Gen. George Stoneman in Arizona, required the Apache to be put on reservations where they would receive supplies and agriculture education. The Apache slipped out and occasionally raided white settlers. In one raid, believed to have been conducted by Apache warriors, settlers and mail runners were murdered near Tucson, Arizona. The townspeople traced this raid to Apache reservation from Camp Grant. 500 Apache lived at the Camp Grant near Dudleyville.

Angered over the murders, the Tucson townspeople hired 92 Papago Indians, 42 Mexicans, and 6 whites to take revenge on the Apache. When the war party reached Camp Grant on April 30, they murdered 144 Apaches, mostly women, and children, in what became known as the Camp Grant Massacre. Twenty-seven captured Apache children were sold into Mexican slavery. In May, an attempt was made by a small federal military party to capture Apache leader Cochise; during the chase, they killed 13 Apache. Grant immediately removed Stoneman of his command in Arizona.

=== Modoc War (1872) ===
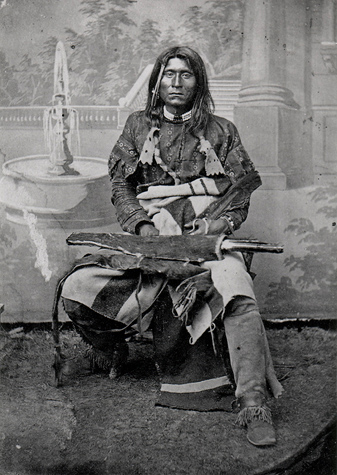
Kintpuash

Two weeks after Grant was elected President for a second term his Native American peace policy was shaken. The Modoc people are a Native tribe who at that time lived by Lake Tule near the Oregon-California border. An earlier 1864 treaty removed the Modocs from their tribal lands, which were handed over to ranchers who coveted the grasslands for their favorable conditions. The Modocs were driven from Lake Tule and relocated 25 miles north and forced to live with the Klamath peoples on the Klamath Reservation. Dissatisfied with their living situation, the Modocs, led by Kintpuash (Captain Jack), rushed back to their original land.

On November 27, the U.S. Army was ordered to force the Modocs back to the Klamath Reservation. On November 28, U.S. Army Captain James Jackson, with 40 troops, reinforced by citizens, went after the Modocs. On November 29, fighting broke out between Jackson's troop-citizen army and the Modocs at the Battle of Lost River near the California-Oregon border, marking the beginning of the Modoc War. Jackson managed to drive the Modocs from their camp, but Hooker Jim and a small band of warriors escaped and killed 18 white settlers. The Modocs fled to a strong defensive position called Stronghold, located in lava beds. On January 17, 1873, the U.S. Army attacked the Modocs at Stronghold, but were repulsed by the Modocs, under the cover of fog and rock formations.

== Second term (1873–1877) ==
Grant's Peace policy unraveled during his second term in office. Under Grant's Peace policy, Wars between settlers, the federal army, and Natives had been decreasing from 101 per year in 1869 to a low of 15 per year in 1875, into Grant's second term. However, the Modoc War, the discovery of gold in the Black Hills of the Dakota Territory, and the completion of the Northern Pacific Railway, threatened to unravel Grant's Indian policy, as white settlers encroached upon native land to mine for gold. Major General Edward Canby was killed in the Modoc War. Indian wars per year jumped up to 32 in 1876 and remained at 43 in 1877. One of the highest casualty Indian battles that took place in American history was at the Battle of Little Bighorn in 1876. Indian war casualties in Montana went from 5 in 1875, to 613 in 1876 and 436 in 1877.

=== Modoc War (1873) ===
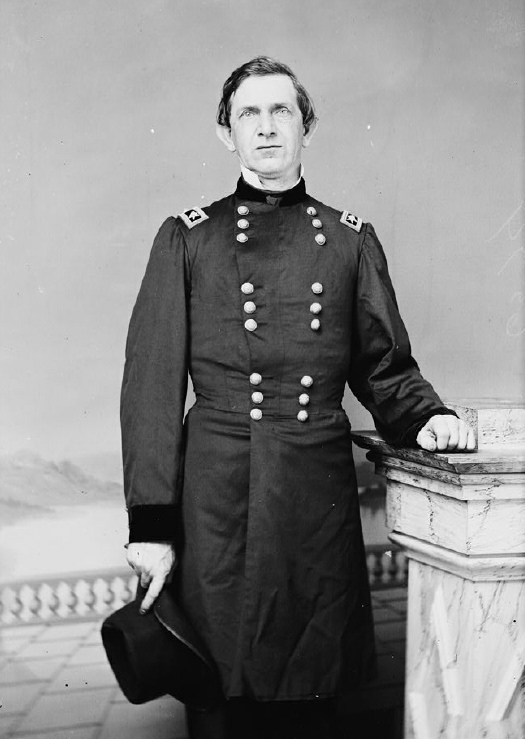
Major General Edward Canby was killed at a Modoc war peace conference.

Grant desired to end the Modoc War that had started in November 1872 peacefully. Grant ordered General Sherman not to attack the Indians, held up at Stronghold, but to settle matters by a commission. Sherman then sent Major General Edward Canby to quell the Native uprising. During the peace negotiations between Brig. Gen. Edward Canby and the Modoc tribal leaders, there were more Indians in the tent then had been agreed upon. Canby had been warned of duplicity among the Modocs, but he held the conference anyway. As the Indians grew more hostile, Captain Jack, said "I talk no more." and shouted "All ready." Captain Jack drew his revolver and fired directly into the head of Canby and killed him. Canby was the highest-ranking officer to be killed during the Indian Wars that took place from 1850 to 1890. Reverend Eleazar Thomas, a Methodist minister, was also killed, Alfred B. Meacham, an Indian Agent, was severely wounded.

The murders shocked the nation, and Sherman wired to have the Modocs exterminated. Grant, however, overruled Sherman and said he wanted only those involved in Canby's assassination to be punished, rather than the whole tribe. On April 15, 1873, the U.S. Army attacked the Modocs held up in Stronghold, however, the fighting was inconclusive and the Modocs escaped. On April 26, the U.S. Army stationed at Sand Butte was attacked by 22 Modocs. On May 10, the Modocs attacked the U.S. Army again at Dry Lake, but this time the battle ended in a decisive U.S. Army victory, and the Modocs finally surrendered. The Modoc warriors who murdered Canby were imprisoned and put on trial and the whole Modoc tribe was rounded up. Meacham, who survived the massacre, defended the indicted Modocs. Captain Jack was found guilty and executed, and the remaining 155 Modocs were relocated to the Quapaw Agency in the Indian Territory. This episode and the Great Sioux War undermined public confidence in Grant's peace policy, according to historian Robert M. Utley.

=== Red River War (1874–1875) ===
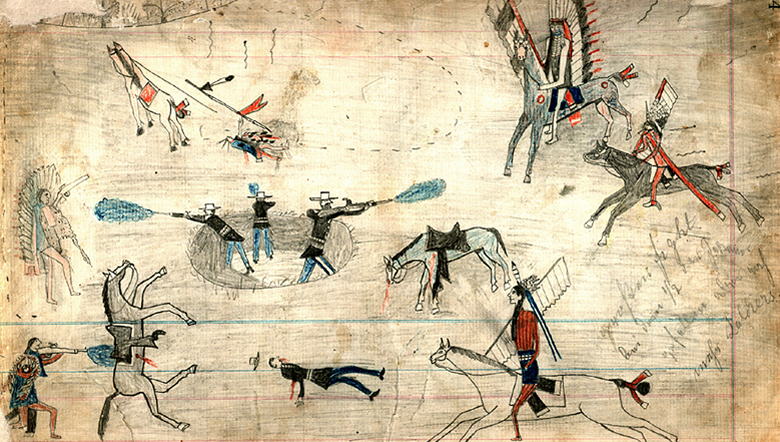
Red River War

After the 1870 invention of a new method to tan buffalo hides the supply of Plains Natives buffalo was decimated by commercial buffalo hunters. The buffalo slaughter was detrimental to the Native peoples, their religion, and their nomadic lifestyle. With diminished buffalo herds the Plains Natives had no means of survival and independence. In 1874, the Red River War erupted on the southern Plains when Quanah Parker, leader of the Comanche, led 700 tribal warriors and attacked the buffalo hunter supply base on the Canadian River, at Adobe Walls, Texas. The Army under General Phil Sheridan launched a military campaign, and, with few casualties on either side, forced the Indians back to their reservations by destroying their horses and winter food supplies. Grant, who agreed to the Army plan advocated by Generals William T. Sherman and Phil Sheridan, imprisoned 74 insurgents in Florida.

=== Great Sioux War (1876–1877) ===
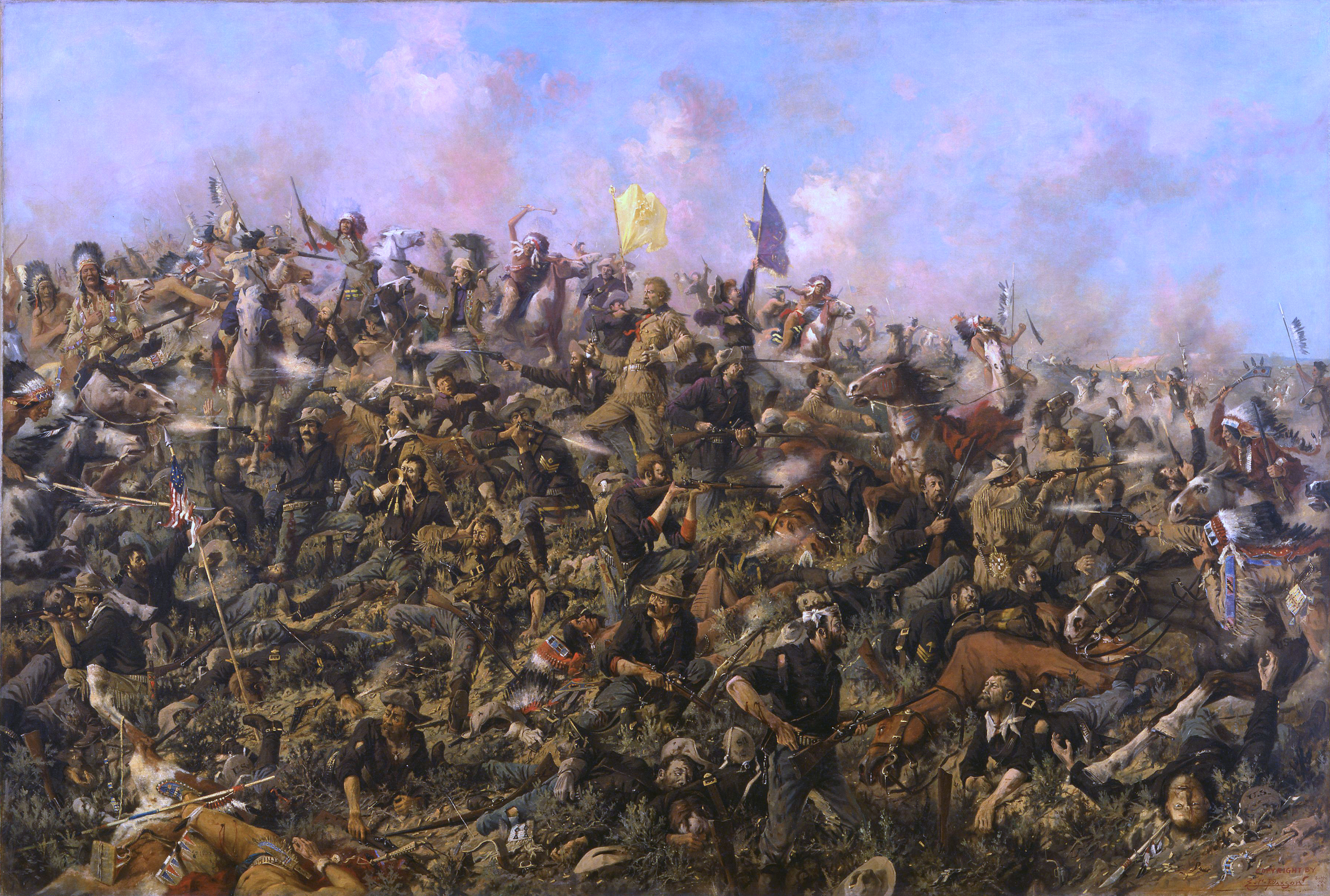
Painting of Custer's troops making their last stand at the Battle of the Little Bighorn by Edgar Samuel Paxson

In 1874 gold had been discovered in the Black Hills in the Dakota Territory. White speculators and settlers rushed in droves seeking riches mining gold on land reserved for the Sioux tribe by the Treaty of Fort Laramie of 1868. In 1875, to avoid conflict Grant met with Red Cloud and Spotted Tail. Later that year, at a September grand council meeting without the participation of Sitting Bull, Crazy Horse and many bands not residing on the agency, a Senate commission offered six million dollars to purchase the land. The offer was declined. On November 3, 1875, at a White House meeting, Phil Sheridan, the President and cabinet officials secretly agreed that the Army was overstretched and would no longer defend the Black Hills portion of the Great Sioux Reservation from the gold prospectors. Sheridan had earlier publicly indicated that the military would be willing to allow settlement if treaty rights were to be extinguished.

On December 3, the Grant administration ordered the Lakota to submit to government authority and go to the reservations. The dispersed resisting bands had entered into winter encampments and could not comply with the deadline the administration set, January 31, 1876, for them to move onto the reservations. A request for a spring council was ignored and the Lakota were characterized as being actively hostile. Interior Secretary Zachariah Chandler allowed the War Department to use force against groups not subject to treaty, with orders issued on February 8 for deployment.

Sheridan used a strategy of convergence, using Army columns to force the Sioux onto the reservation. On June 25, 1876, one of these columns, led by Colonel George Armstrong Custer met the Sioux at the Battle of the Little Bighorn and part of his command was slaughtered. Approximately 253 federal soldiers and civilians were killed compared to 40 Indians.

Custer's death and the Battle of the Little Big Horn shocked the nation. Sheridan avenged Custer, pacified the northern Plains, and put the defeated Sioux on the reservation. On August 15, 1876, President Grant signed a proviso giving the Sioux nation $1,000,000 in rations, while the Sioux relinquished all rights to the Black Hills, except for a 40-mile land tract west of the 103rd meridian. On August 28, a seven-man committee, appointed by Grant, gave additional harsh stipulations for the Sioux in order to receive government assistance. Halfbreeds and "squaw men" (a white man with an Indian wife) were banished from the Sioux reservation. To receive the government rations, the Indians had to work the land. Reluctantly, on September 20, the Indian leaders, whose people were starving, agreed to the committee's demands and signed the agreement.

During the Great Sioux War, Grant came into conflict with Col. George Armstrong Custer after he testified in 1876 about corruption in the War Department under Secretary William W. Belknap (see below). Grant had Custer arrested for breach of military protocol in Chicago and barred him from leading an upcoming campaign against the Sioux. Grant finally relented and let Custer fight under Brig. Gen. Alfred Terry. Two months after Custer's death Grant castigated him in the press, saying "I regard Custer's massacre as a sacrifice of troops, brought on by Custer himself, that was wholly unnecessary – wholly unnecessary." As the nation was shocked by the death of Custer, Grant's peace policy became militaristic; Congress appropriated funds for 2,500 more troops, two more forts were constructed, the army took over the Indian agencies and Indians were barred from purchasing rifles and ammunition.

== Buffalo destruction ==
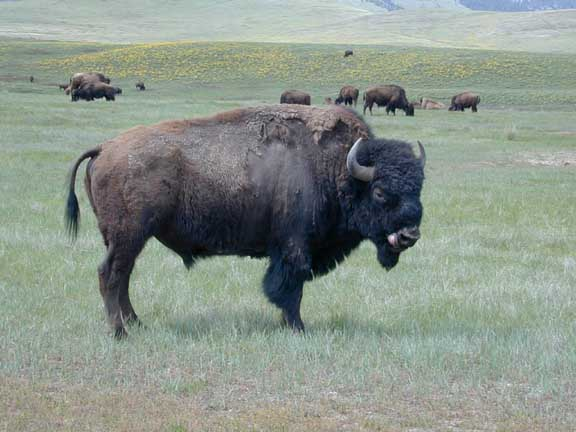
American buffalo or bison

Central to the Grant administration Peace policy was allowing the destruction of the buffalo, the Native food supply, to keep Native peoples dependent on government supplies. In 1872, around two thousand white buffalo hunters working between Kansas and Arkansas were killing buffalo for their hides by the many thousands. The demand was for boots for European armies, or machine belts attached to steam engines. Acres of land were dedicated solely for drying the hides of the slaughtered buffalo. Native Americans protested at the "wanton destruction" of their food supply. Between 1872 and 1874, the buffalo herd south of the Platte River yielded 4.4 million kills by white hunters, and about 1 million animals killed by Indians.

Popular concern for the destruction of the buffalo mounted, and a bill in Congress was passed, HR 921, that would have made buffalo hunting illegal for whites. Taking advice from Secretary Delano, Grant chose to pocket-veto the bill, believing that the demise of the buffalo would reduce Indian wars and force tribes to stay on their respected reservations and to adopt an agricultural lifestyle rather than roaming the plains and hunting buffalo. Ranchers wanted the buffalo gone to open pasture land for their cattle herds. With the buffalo food supply lowered, Native Americans were forced to stay on reservations.

== Historical reputation and evaluation ==
Historian Robert M. Utley (1984) contended that Grant, as a pragmatist, saw no inconsistencies with dividing up Native American posts among religious leaders and military officers. He added that Grant's "Quaker Policy", despite having good intentions, failed to solve the real dilemma of the misunderstandings between "the motivations, purposes, and ways of thinking" between both White and Native American cultures. These inconsistencies were evident in the breakdown of peace negotiations between the U.S. military and the Modoc tribal leaders during the Modoc War from 1872 to 1873.

Historian Robert E. Ficken points out that the peace policy involved assimilation with the Indians practically forced to engage in farming, rather than hunting, even though much of the reservation land was too barren for farming. The policy also led to boarding schools that have come under intense criticism since the late 20th century. Critics, in addition, note that reformers called for "allotment" (the breakup of an entire reservation so the land would be owned in individual blocks by individual families, who could then resell it to non-Indians) without considering whether it would be beneficial. Ficken concludes that Grant's policy "contained the seeds for its own failure." Historian Cary Collins says Grant's "Peace Policy," failed in the Pacific Northwest chiefly because of sectarian competition and the priority placed on proselytizing by the religious denominations. Historian Robert Keller surveying the Peace policy as a whole concludes that Grant's policy was terminated in 1882, and resulted in "cultural destruction [of] the majority of Indians."

Congressional reaction to the losses suffered by Lt. Col. George Armstrong Custer's unit at the Battle of the Little Big Horn in 1876 was shock and dismay at the failure of the Peace Policy. Grant blamed Custer wholly for the defeat stating that the sacrifice of troops was unnecessary. The Indian appropriations measure of August 1876 marked the end of Grant's Peace Policy. The Sioux were given the choice of either selling their lands in the Black Hills for cash or not receiving government gifts of food and other supplies.

== Cinematic portrayals ==
The movie Drum Beat (1954) is about 1872 violence along the California-Oregon border by Modoc Indians and the death of General Canby in a cinematic format. The movie covers both sides of the plight of the Modoc Indians and the westward expansion of white settlers. President Grant is portrayed as an intelligent leader, but compassionate and fair-minded toward Indians. Grant is played by actor Hayden Rorke.

== Sources ==
- Brown, Dee (2007). Bury My Heart at Wounded Knee. New York: Henry Holt and Company. ISBN 978-0-03-085322-7. OCLC 110210. Wikipedia link.
