= Boston Charley =

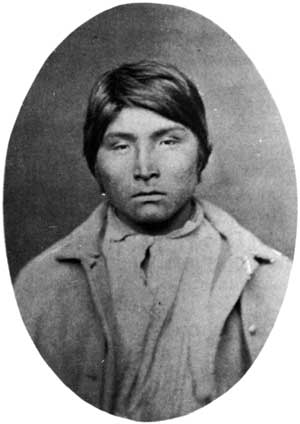
- Boston Charley in 1873
- Born: c. 1854; California, U.S.
- Died: October 3, 1873 (aged 19); Fort Klamath, Oregon, U.S.
- Status: Executed by hanging
- Conviction: Murder
- Penalty: Death

Boston Charley (c. 1854 – October 3, 1873) was a Modoc warrior in the Modoc War of 1872. He was reportedly given the "Boston" moniker by miners who felt he had a lighter complexion than the other warriors. In 1873 he had joined the group led by Kintpuash, and was later involved in a massacre in which fourteen people were killed at Tule Lake. On April 11, 1873, he was part of a group that murdered Edward Canby. Charley did not personally kill Canby, but during the raid he killed a Dr. Thomas. On October 3, 1873, Boston Charley, Kintpuash, Schonchin John and Black Jim were executed for the murder of Edward Canby. He reportedly met his execution stoically, asking only for tobacco.

== See also ==
- Death of Edward Canby
