= Keshlakchuis, California =

Keshlakchuis is a former Modoc settlement in Modoc County, California, United States.

It was located on the southeastern side of Rhett Lake.
