= Fern Cave Archeological Site =

- U.S. National Register of Historic Places
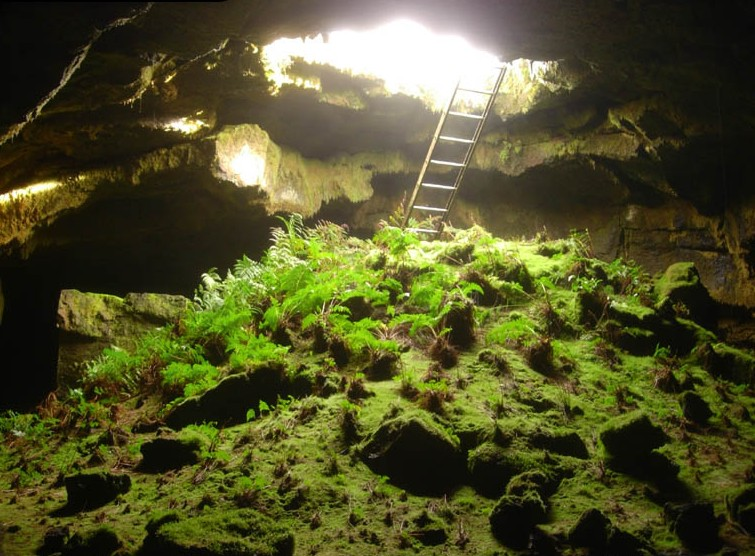
- Nearest city: Tulelake, California
- Area: 54 acres (22 ha)
- NRHP reference No.: 75000224
- Added to NRHP: May 29, 1975

The Fern Cave Archeological Site, in Lava Beds National Monument near Tule Lake, California, was listed on the National Register of Historic Places in 1975.

Fern Cave is one of the oldest archeological sites in the northwestern United States. Due to its unique and fragile ecosystem, as well as its spiritual value to the Modoc people, the cave is open to ranger-led tours only by appointment.

Oral histories of the Modoc create a rich history around the Fern Cave. Modoc mythology includes a story of the first Maklak (also spelled Ma'qlaq) or "People". The story tells of a courageous group of water spirits referred to as "Gwagónus" that come to the aid of Kemush and descend into the cave to fight the primordial darkness. In the battle, the Gwagónus seal the darkness under the Fern Cave with molten rock at the sacrifice of their water skins, transforming them into the first Maklak. The molten rock given credit for creating their brown skin, the water skin turning into the sacred water that condenses in the cave giving it the unique environment it's known for.

Stories continue, the cave drawings credited by tribal experts as records of the eruption of Mount Mazama now Crater Lake National Park. Modoc mythology tells of Kemush leading the Maklaks underground to safety as the mountain erupted. The water from the cave providing sustenance and the thick basalt walls giving shelter as the ash cloud dispersed. Though no academic consensus has been reached on what the pictographs inside of the Fern Cave depict, Modoc oral tradition claims that the images are a record of this.

In contemporary history, Fern Cave was one of the vestiges of the Modoc as they fought against the U.S. Government in the Modoc War. Kintpuash, leader of the Modoc, used the Fern Cave to shelter women and children away from fighting, centralized in and around the Stronghold.

A 54 acres (22 ha) area including the cave was listed on the National Register for its information potential.

== Additional Reading ==
- H.L. Delaney Captain Jack and The Original Renegades (2026) Eagle Speaker Publishing
- H.L. Delaney The Book of Spirals (2025) Basalt Sea Press
