= Curley Headed Doctor =

Modoc spiritual leader

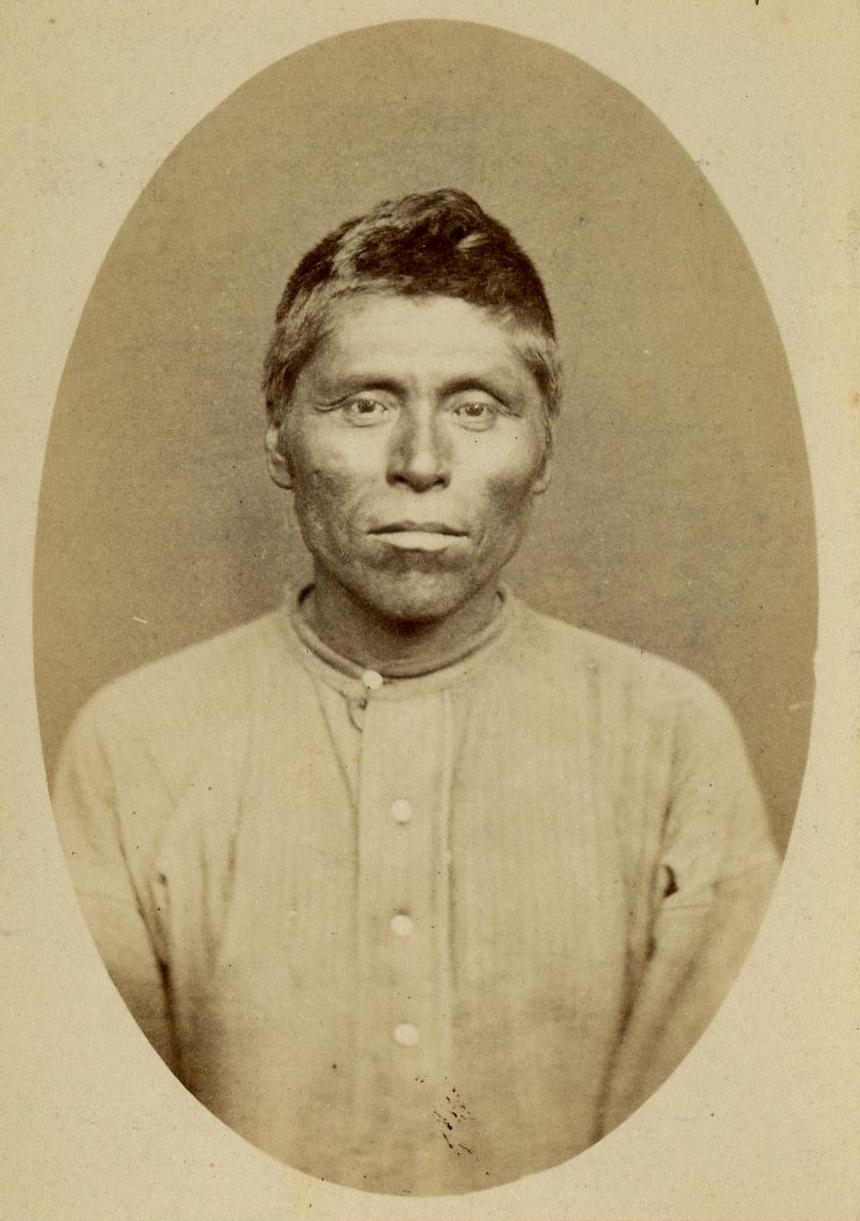

Curley Headed Doctor (Modoc: Cho-ocks, 1828 — 1890; also Curly-Headed Doctor) was the spiritual leader for the Modoc tribe, notably during the Modoc War.

== Background ==
Curley Headed Doctor was Modoc from California. While initially a proponent of peaceful coexistence with the white settlers in the area, Curley Headed Doctor came to stand for Modoc independence as a means to preserve religious beliefs and traditions. He learned the Ghost Dance from a Paiute Indian.

In response to encroachment by American gold prospectors and ranchers, leaders of his tribe ceded their traditional homelands to settle on a reservation in Oregon, jointly occupied by the Klamath and Yahooskin Band of Snake Indians in 1864. Reservation life was difficult for the Modoc, due to a neglectful and corrupt Indian agent and continual harassment by the Klamath. The leader of Curley Headed Doctor's band, known as the Hot Creeks, was Captain Jack. Captain Jack led the band back to their ancestral homelands in California. The US Army responded violently.

== Modoc Wars and removal ==
During the Battle of Lost River on November 29, 1872, Curley Headed Doctor led dances to support Modoc warriors. Detractors of the medicine man accused him of having, "used magic and fanaticism to support the followers of Jack." Due to his involvement, Curley Headed Doctor was indicted by an Oregon grand jury but not tried.

He is credited with raising the fog in the area that protected the tribe during the First Battle of the Stronghold in January 1873, and leading them in the Ghost Dance to protect and save them from extinction. He urged the assassination of the Peace Commissioners but did not physically harm them.

After the Modoc surrendered, he was spared by the US Government and deported to Indian Territory with the survivors of Captain Jack's band, who would become the Modoc Tribe of Oklahoma. Curley Headed Doctor died in Oklahoma.

== Family ==
His son-in-law was Hooker Jim, a Modoc warrior who played a pivotal role in the Modoc War.
