= James Jackson (Medal of Honor) =

American Army officer and Medal of Honor recipient

- Born: November 21, 1833; New Jersey, United States
- Died: October 21, 1916 (aged 82); Portland, Oregon
- Burial place: River View Cemetery
- Military career
- Allegiance: United States of America
- Branch: United States Army
- Service years: 1861–1897
- Rank: Brigadier General (posthumous)
- Units: 1st U.S. Cavalry; 2nd U.S. Cavalry; 4th U.S. Cavalry
- Conflicts: American Civil War; Indian Wars; Modoc War; Nez Percé Wars
- Awards: Medal of Honor

James Jackson (November 21, 1833 – October 21, 1916) was an American officer in the U.S. Army during the mid- to late-19th century. He was a captain with the 12th Iowa Volunteer Infantry Regiment during the American Civil War and with the 1st U.S. Cavalry in the Indian Wars. While fighting the Nez Percé at Battle of Camas Meadows in 1877, he risked his life to recover the body of another soldier, preventing its mutilation by the enemy. For this act, he received the Medal of Honor nearly 20 years later.

== Biography ==
=== Early life and military career ===
James Jackson was born in New Jersey on November 21, 1833. Sometime after graduating from Philadelphia High School, he went west to the frontier and eventually settled in Iowa. At the beginning of the Civil War, Jackson actively recruited volunteers for the 12th Iowa Volunteer Infantry Regiment. He attained this position from Colonel William B. Allison, then an aide to Governor Samuel J. Kirkwood, who would go on to have a successful political career as a Congressman in Washington, DC. In 1862, he left Dubuque with the 12th Infantry to join the Army of the Potomac and saw action at Fredericksburg, Chancellorsville, Gettysburg, the Wilderness, Cold Harbor, and Spotsylvania. Jackson was cited for "gallant service" in several major engagements throughout the war and twice brevetted at the Battle of North Anna and the Second Battle of the Weldon Railroad in August 1864.

Jackson joined the Regular Army after the war's end. In 1867, he was assigned to frontier duty in Nebraska, where he protected Union Pacific Railway workers during the construction of the Transcontinental Railroad. He was also stationed at various outposts in the Wyoming and Colorado Territories during the next several years. Although he would have been forced to retire in accordance with federal law, Jackson was able to remain in the service though the use of political connections in the 1870s. He was assisted in this by Iowa Senator James Harlan, via his brother-in-law C.W. Atkinson, who appealed to another Iowan, Secretary of War General William Belknap. In his letter to Belknap, Harlan wrote that Jackson,

..has been a citizen of Iowa for nearly fifteen years-has been an unflinching Republican from the organization of the party, is a true gentleman of irreproachable character-perfectly temperate using neither intoxicating liquors or tobacco in any form, and is the stay and support of his widowed mother in her old age. Such men adorn and honor the service, rather than receive honor from it.

Harlan's words helped persuade Belknap that Jackson should be exempted from the federal law and was allowed to remain in military service. Shortly afterwards, Jackson participated in the campaign against Captain Jack in the Modoc Indian War and commanded troops at the Battle of Lost River on November 28, 1872. He also made several trips to Iowa from time to time including an 1873 visit to his mother in Mason City shortly before her death. Jackson also married Ida Jane Jackson, a woman 18 years his junior, and they had one child together.

=== Battle of Camas Meadow ===
Jackson continued to serve on the frontier throughout the 1870s and took part in campaigns against the Plains Indians. Under the overall command of General Oliver Otis Howard, his unit participated in the pursuit of Chief Joseph and the Nez Percé who attempted to escape to Canada and joined Howard near the end of the Battle of the Clearwater on July 10, 1877. A month later, Jackson's unit encountered Chief Joseph's warriors at Camas Meadows in the Idaho Territory on August 20, 1877. His commanding officer, Captain Randolph Norwood, had moved ahead of the main force under orders to find and engage the renegades, but were instead taken by surprise when the Nez Percé launched a frontal assault. In the first moments of battle, trumpeter Bernard Brooks was killed. Jackson and another nearby soldier dismounted while under heavy fire and risked their lives to take Brooks' body with them and hid his body in a clump of bushes before rejoining their unit in retreat. The Nez Percé, wanting to return to Chief Joseph and their people as quickly as possible, escaped into the wilderness once the cavalry's horses and mules were secured. Jackson and his men buried Brooks before returning to camp.

It was believed by the Nez Percé and other tribes that if they maimed captured or dead soldiers, then they would be so in the afterlife, as well. Consequently, the recovered bodies of soldiers would frequently be found badly mutilated and Jackson hoped to spare his fallen comrade a similar fate. It would be 18 years before Jackson's actions were recognized by the government. In 1895, Major Eugene Carr of the 8th U.S. Cavalry petitioned for Jackson to receive the Medal of Honor.

As I was an eyewitness of the whole affair I feel it my duty to endeavor, even at this late day, to obtain for Captain (now Major) Jackson a proper recognition of an act of unusually distinguished gallantry displayed under circumstances making its performance much more noteworthy and hazardous than it could possibly be if dealing with an enemy governed by the rules of civilized warfare.

Carr's request was initially declined by the then Acting Secretary of War who believed the incident occurred too long ago to merit issuing the award. Additional support from General Howard and other officers, however, made the War Department reconsider its position and a decision was made in April 1897 to give the award to Jackson who received the medal by registered mail that same month.

=== Retirement and later years ===
After Camas Meadow, Jackson commanded several frontier posts in the Pacific Northwest, including Fort Klamath and Fort Walla Walla, as well as a recruiter for the U.S. Army in New York City, and later for the Oregon National Guard. He was also a professor of military science and tactics at Bishop Scott Academy in Portland, Oregon. Jackson retired from active service on November 21, 1897, with the rank of lieutenant colonel. However, several of his friends in Oregon sought, on his behalf, an appointment to the rank of brigadier general to honor his long military service. Government bureaucracy and changing presidential administration delayed the process for well over a decade. Jackson died in Portland on October 21, 1916, at the age of 82. He was interred at River View Cemetery. Thirteen days after his death, a telegram was delivered to his address notifying him of his promotion to brigadier general.

== Medal of Honor citation ==
Rank and organization: Captain, 1st U.S. Cavalry. Place and date: At Camas Meadows, Idaho, 20 August 1877. Entered service at: ------. Birth: New Jersey. Date of issue: 17 April 1896.

Citation:

Dismounted from his horse in the face of a heavy fire from pursuing Indians, and with the assistance of 1 or 2 of the men of his command secured to a place of safety the body of his trumpeter, who had been shot and killed.

== See also ==
- List of Medal of Honor recipients for the Indian Wars
