= Modoc traditional narratives =

Modoc traditional narratives include myths, legends, tales, and oral histories preserved by the Modoc and Klamath people of northern California and southern Oregon.

Modoc oral literature is representative of the Plateau region, but with influences from the Northwest Coast, the Great Basin, and central California. Of particular interest are accounts supposedly describing the volcanic origin of Crater Lake in Oregon. (See also Traditional narratives (Native California).)

== Online examples of Modoc narratives ==
- The North American Indian by Edward S. Curtis (1924)
- "The Legends of Crater Lake" by W. Craig Thomas (1984)

== Sources for Modoc narratives ==
- Applegate, O. C. 1907. "The Klamath Legend of La-o". Steel Points 1:75-76.
- Bancroft, Hubert Howe. 1883. The Native Races: Myths and Languages. 5 vols. History, San Francisco.
- Barker, M. A. R. 1963. Klamath Texts. University of California Publications in Linguistics No. 30. Berkeley. (21 Klamath myths collected in 1955–1957, including Bear and Fawns, pp. 7–117.)
- Clark, Ella E. 1953. Indian Legends of the Pacific Northwest. University of California Press, Berkeley.(Includes seven narratives, pp. 9–11, 53–61, 132–135, from Applegate 1907, Bancroft 1883, Curtin 1912, Gatschet 1890, Miller 1874, Steel 1890, 1907, and manuscript sources.)
- Clark, Ella E. 1963. "Indian Geology". Pacific Discovery 16(5):2-9. (Discussion of Klamath myth concerning the origin of Crater Lake.)
- Curtin, Jeremiah. 1912. Myths of the Modocs. Little, Brown, Boston. (Extensive narratives, including "Theft of Fire," "Orpheus," and "Loon Woman," collected in 1884 from Koalakaka.)
- Curtis, Edward S. 1907–1930. The North American Indian. 20 vols. Plimpton Press, Norwood, Massachusetts. (Three myths collected from Long Wilson, vol. 13, pp. 210–213.)
- Erdoes, Richard, and Alfonso Ortiz. 1984. American Indian Myths and Legends. Pantheon Books, New York. (Retelling of narratives from Clark 1952, pp. 85–87, 109–111.)
- Frey, Rodney, and Dell Mymes. 1998. "Mythology". In Plateau, edited by Deward E. Walker Jr., pp. 584–600. Handbook of North American Indians, William C. Sturtevant, general editor, Vol. 12. Smithsonian Institution, Washington, D.C. (Regional context for Modoc-Klamath myths.)
- Gatschet, Albert S. 1970. "Mythological Text in the Klamath Language of Southern Oregon," American Antiquarian and Oriental Journal 1:161-166.
- Gatschet, Albert S. 1891. "Oregonian Folk-Lore," Journal of American Folklore 4:139-143. (Three Modoc tales.)
- Kroeber, A. L. 1925. Handbook of the Indians of California. Bureau of American Ethnology Bulletin No. 78. Washington, D.C. (Brief comparative notes, pp. 321–322.)
- Margolin, Malcolm. 1993. The Way We Lived: California Indian Stories, Songs, and Reminiscences. First edition 1981. Heyday Books, Berkeley, California. (A war narrative, pp. 115–116, from Ray 1963.)
- Ramsey, Jarold. 1977. Coyote Was Going There: Indian Literature of the Oregon Country. University of Washington Press, Seattle. (11 narratives, pp. 185–213, from Barker 1963, Curtin 1912, Curtis 1907–1930, Gatschet 1890, Spier 1930, and Wood 1929.)
- Stern, Theodore. 1956. "Sources of Variability in Klamath Mythology". Journal of American Folklore 69:1-12, 135–146, 377–386. (Analysis.)
- Stern, Theodore. 1963. "Ideal and Expected Behavior as Seen in Klamath Mythology". Journal of American Folklore 76:21-30. (Analysis.)
- Stern, Theodore. 1963. "Klamath Myth Abstracts". Journal of American Folklore 76:31-42. (Material from various previous collections, including Orpheus and Bear and Fawns.)
- Stern, Theodore. 1998. "Klamath and Modoc". In Plateau, edited by Deward E. Walker Jr., pp. 446–466. Handbook of North American Indians, William C. Sturtevant, general editor, Vol. 12. Smithsonian Institution, Washington, D.C. (Brief overview of mythology, p. 459.)
- Thomas, W. Craig. 1984. The Legends of Crater Lake. In: Historic Resource Study: Crater Lake National Park, Oregon, by Linda W. Greene, Appendix E. National Park Service, Denver. (Long, romanticized version of a Klamath myth.)
