= Hooker Jim =

Modoc warrior (c. 1851 - 1879)

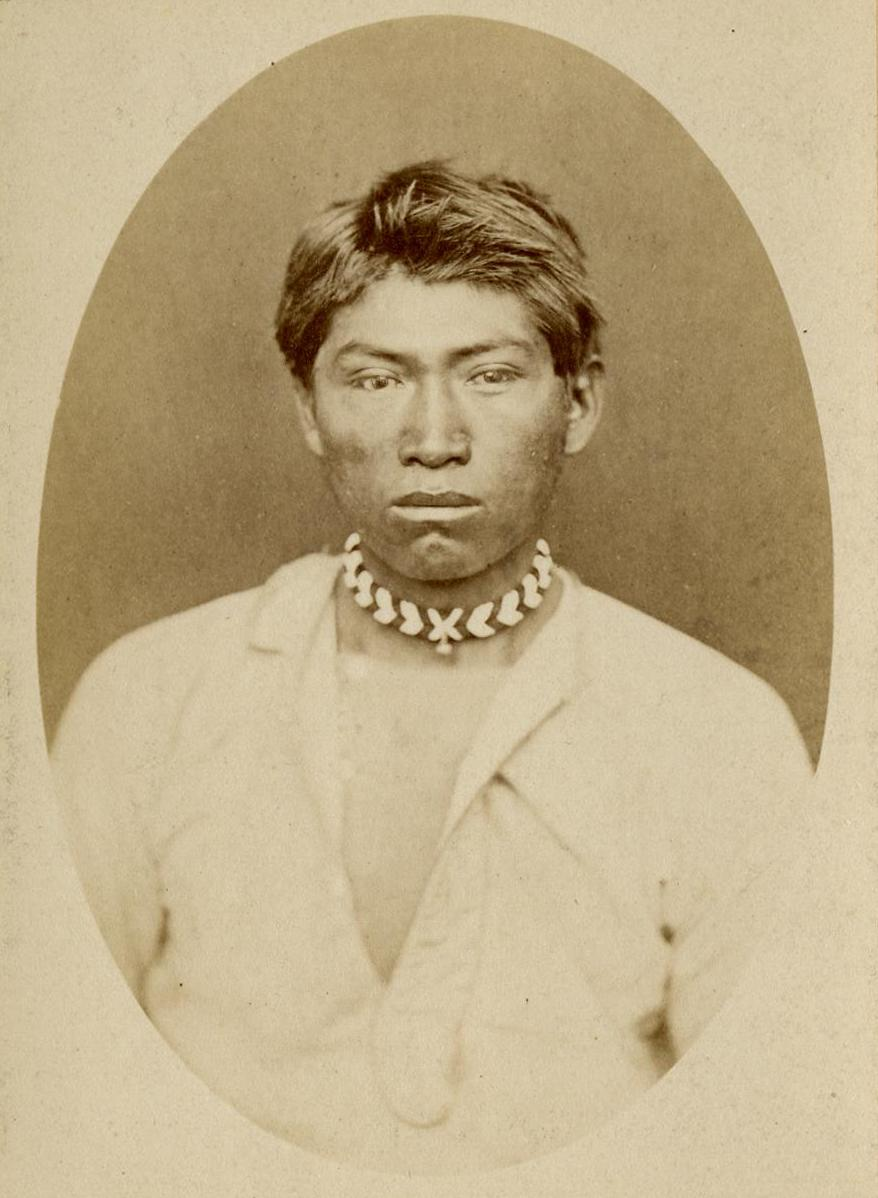
Hooker Jim

Hooker Jim (c. 1851–1879), or Hooka Jim, was a Modoc warrior who played a pivotal role in the Modoc War. A respected headman of the Hot Creek Modoc, Hooker Jim's first wife as the daughter of medicine man Curley Headed Doctor.

Most famously, after the Modoc surrender in the Battle of Lost River, American cavalry fired on unarmed Modoc prisoners. The Modoc fought back, culminating in the captured Modoc escaping.

After escape, Hooker Jim led a band to Modoc ancestral lands along Lost River. Hooker Jim and his warriors sought retaliation for the Calvary firing on unarmed prisoners. Going farm to farm, Hooker Jim killed over a dozen men who served as American militia members. All of them were given the land by the American government without regard to Modoc ownership.

The Lost River rampage was a point of contention throughout the Modoc War. Captain Jack, the Modoc chief, repeatedly refused to hand Hooker Jim and the other Modocs who had killed the settlers over to authorities.

Soon after, as the Army invaded the Lava Beds Modoc forces were dispersed. Hooker Jim and his small band isolated and outnumbered were eventually captured. Hooker Jim was part of the "Modoc Bloodhounds" used by the Army. Promised clemency for both himself and his long time friend Captain Jack, Hooker Jim was eventually able to bring Captain Jack in peacefully. Upon capture Hooker Jim was detained in the prison camp at the Klamath Reservation with other tribal members. The amnesty agreement promised to his accomplices was not honored and eventually Hooker Jim was compelled to testify against Jack in exchange for the safety of his family. Hooker Jim was exiled to Oklahoma with all other members of the Modoc, dying there before 1879.
