= Battle of Lost River =

Coordinates: 41.996°N 121.524°W

- Part of Modoc War (Indian Wars)
Date	November 29, 1872
Location	Lost River (along the California-Oregon border)
Result	Marginal United States victory

Belligerents
United States	Modoc

Commanders and leaders
Captain James Jackson	Captain Jack; Scarface Charley; Hooker Jim

Strength
40+ {U.S. 1st Cavalry Regiment}+citizens	Unknown

Casualties and losses
1 killed, 7 wounded	2 killed, 3 wounded

The Battle of Lost River in November 1872 was the first battle in the Modoc War in the northwestern United States. The skirmish, which was fought near the Lost River along the California–Oregon border, was the result of an attempt by the U.S. 1st Cavalry Regiment of the United States Army to force a band of the Modoc tribe to relocate back to the Klamath Reservation, which they had left in objection of its conditions.

In the subsequent war, Captain Jack of the Modoc and 53 warriors held off more than 1000 U.S. soldiers for 7 months in the area of the present-day Lava Beds National Monument. Part of this was named Captain Jack's Stronghold in his honor.

== Description ==
In the 1860s, the Modoc had been removed from their traditional home near the Lost River in California to the newly established Klamath Reservation in Oregon. The two tribes had familial and trade relations prior to the incursion of the American settlers. However, the limited resources made available to Native captives at the Klamath Reservation eroded any prior relationship. Faced with starvation, the more numerous Klamath preyed on the Modoc within the confinement of the reservation. The resulting conflicts led to the Modoc leaving the reservation under duress.

In 1872, Kintpuash (Captain Jack) led his band of about 100 Modoc back to their traditional home on Lost River. American settlers had moved into the area, having been granted land by the American government. Upon their return, conflict and confusion arose about the returning Modoc. American settlers insisted the Modoc be forced back to the reservation. While the Modoc, confiscated livestock and food stores as compensation for the American encampments on unceded land .

On November 27, Bureau of Indian Affairs Superintendent T. B. Odeneal requested Major John Green, commanding officer at Fort Klamath, to furnish sufficient troops to compel Captain Jack to return to the reservation. On November 28, Captain James Jackson, commanding 40 troops, left Fort Klamath for Captain Jack's camp. Reinforced by citizen militia from Linkville (now Klamath Falls, Oregon), the troops reached Jack's camp on the Lost River about a mile above Emigrant Crossing (now Stone Bridge, Oregon) on November 29.

Wishing to avoid conflict and with assurances that the lack of resources on the reservation would be resolved, Captain Jack agreed to return to the Klamath Reservation. The situation became tense when Captain Jackson demanded the Modoc disarm. Modoc leaders made argument that the weapons were necessary for sustenance hunting and were allowed in their possession on the Klamath Reservation. Eventually, under the promise from Captain Jackson that the weapons would be returned once they arrived peacefully at Fort Klamath, the Modoc surrendered their weapons.

In transit, Scarfaced Charley and an unidentified army sergeant reportedly got into a verbal argument, resulting in the discharge of a side arm. American military accounts claim that Scarfaced Charley had concealed a weapon, while Modoc first hand accounts and oral history report that the American army fired on unarmed prisoners, largely women and children. There is no definite proof of which story is correct. In initial fighting 2 Modoc prisoners were killed and a number wounded.

Once the shots were fired, the Modoc scrambled to regain their weapons, making their way south, toward the basalt flats of the Lava Beds in northern California. The lava caves and basalt rock formations were a natural fortress, too rugged for cavalry to pursue across. Archeological records indicate that the Modoc had locations like the Fern Cave since before 10,000 b.c.e. Captain Jackson, suffering 7 wounded soldiers and 1 casualty and unable to pursue the Modoc on horseback, ordered his troops to retreat to await reinforcements.

As the cavalry retreated, a small band of Modoc under the leadership of Hooker Jim sought retaliation for American soldiers firing on unarmed prisoners. Traveling separately from the primary Modoc force, Hooker Jim attacked American settlers, largely volunteer militia members, occupying unceded Modoc lands along Lost River. The action resulting in the death of 18 American men on the afternoon of November 29 and morning of November 30. Hooker Jim's band reported no casualties. The retaliation led to further calls for the US Army troops to remove the Modoc.

== Additional reading ==
- H.L. Delaney Captain Jack and The Original Renegades (2026) Eagle Speaker Publishing ISBN 979-8258998019
