= Fort Klamath =

- Klamath County, Oregon
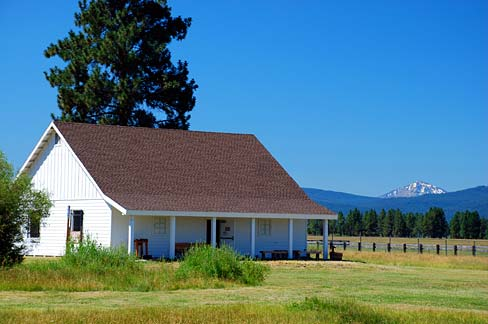
- Fort Klamath guard house

Site information
- Type: Military base
- Controlled by: United States Army

Site history
- Built: 1863
- In use: 1863–1890
- Materials: wood
- Battles/wars: Modoc Wars

Garrison information
- Past commanders: Edward Canby
- Garrison: 14th Infantry Regiment
- Fort Klamath Site
- U.S. National Register of Historic Places
- Location within Oregon Location within the United States
- Nearest city: Fort Klamath, Oregon
- Coordinates: 42°41′31″N 121°58′20″W
- Built: 1863
- NRHP reference No.: 71000680
- Added to NRHP: October 07, 1971

Fort Klamath was a military outpost near the western end of the Oregon Trail, between Crater Lake National Park and Upper Klamath Lake in Klamath County, Oregon, United States. The Fort Klamath Site, about a mile southeast of the present community of Fort Klamath, Oregon, is listed on the U.S. National Register of Historic Places

== History ==
Fort Klamath was established in 1863, and was an important Army post during conflicts with the Klamath, Modoc, and Northern Paiute tribes. The fort consisted of more than 50 buildings, including a sawmill. Four Modoc men, led by Kintpuash, were executed there in 1873 for the killing of General Edward Canby. Their graves remain at the fort.

A post office was opened in 1879. By the mid-1880s, the settlers in the area no longer needed protection, and in 1889 the decision was made to close the fort. After a harsh final winter with more than 20 feet (6 m) of snow, the troops of Company I of the 14th Infantry Regiment left the fort on June 23, 1890, and moved to Vancouver Barracks.

== Fort Klamath Museum ==
An 8-acre (32,000 m^{2}) parcel within the fort area is maintained as a park and museum by Klamath County, Oregon. The Fort Klamath Museum is housed in a modern structure designed after the fort's guardhouse and standing in the original guardhouse location.

The Fort Klamath site was added to the National Register of Historic Places in 1971.

== See also ==
- Modoc War
