= Kintpuash =

Chief of the Modoc tribe of California and Oregon (c.1837-1873)

Kintpuash "Captain Jack"
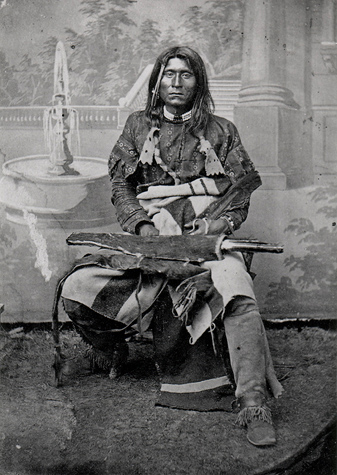
- Kintpuash in 1864

Chief of the Modoc people

Personal details
- Born: c. 1837 Wa’Chamshwash, Lost River, California
- Died: October 3, 1873 (aged 35–36) Fort Klamath, Oregon
- Cause of death: Execution by hanging

Military service
- Battles/wars: Modoc War

Kintpuash (c. 1837 – October 3, 1873), also known as Kientpoos, Keintpoos, or by his English name Captain Jack, was a Modoc leader from present-day northern California and southern Oregon. His name in the Modoc language translates to "strikes the water brashly." Kintpuash is best known for leading his people in resisting forced relocation during the Modoc War of 1872–1873. Using the rugged terrain of the Lava Beds in California, his small band of warriors held off vastly superior US Army forces for several months. He remains the only Native American leader to be charged with war crimes. Kintpuash was executed by hanging, along with three others, for their role in the deaths of General Edward Canby and Reverend Eleazar Thomas during peace negotiations.

== Life ==
=== Modoc Tribe ===
Kintpuash was born around 1837 in Wa’Chamshwash near Tule Lake, in present-day California. The Modocs considered Tule Lake sacred, marking it as the location where the trickster spirit Kemush took the worlds first breath. Modoc territory straddled what is now the California-Oregon border. Known for their craftsmanship, the Modocs wove baskets from tule reeds, reflecting their reliance on the resources of the land. They lived in familial bands, migrating seasonally between Mount Shasta and the areas northward beyond the Lost River, sustaining themselves through hunting and gathering. The Modoc relied heavily on the marsh for sustenance, their diet centered around c'waam, salmon, trout, ducks, and gathered plants such as wocus and epos root. Their diet was occasionally supplemented with larger game; deer, antelope and rabbits. The unique diet is credited for the unusually long lifespans, with reports of some Modoc living to 150 years old.

Contact with fur traders began in 1824, about thirteen years before Kintpuash's birth. This interaction brought diseases that significantly reduced the Modoc population, from approximately 1,000 to just 300 by 1860. The discovery of gold in 1851 exacerbated the Modocs' challenges, as settlers disrupted traditional food supplies and claimed fertile lands. During early interactions with settlers, Modocs' leased land and worked alongside settlers in attempts to peacefully co-exist. Many Modoc men, including Kintpuash, found work in Shasta County in mines and on farms. Later there would be disputes; settlers refusing to pay their land leases accused Modoc bands of killing unattended livestock, and the Modoc land owners asserted ownership of the livestock due to the default on payments. Kintpuash's early life and the history of the Modoc people reflect the devastating effects of settler encroachment and disease, which significantly reduced their population and disrupted their traditional way of life.

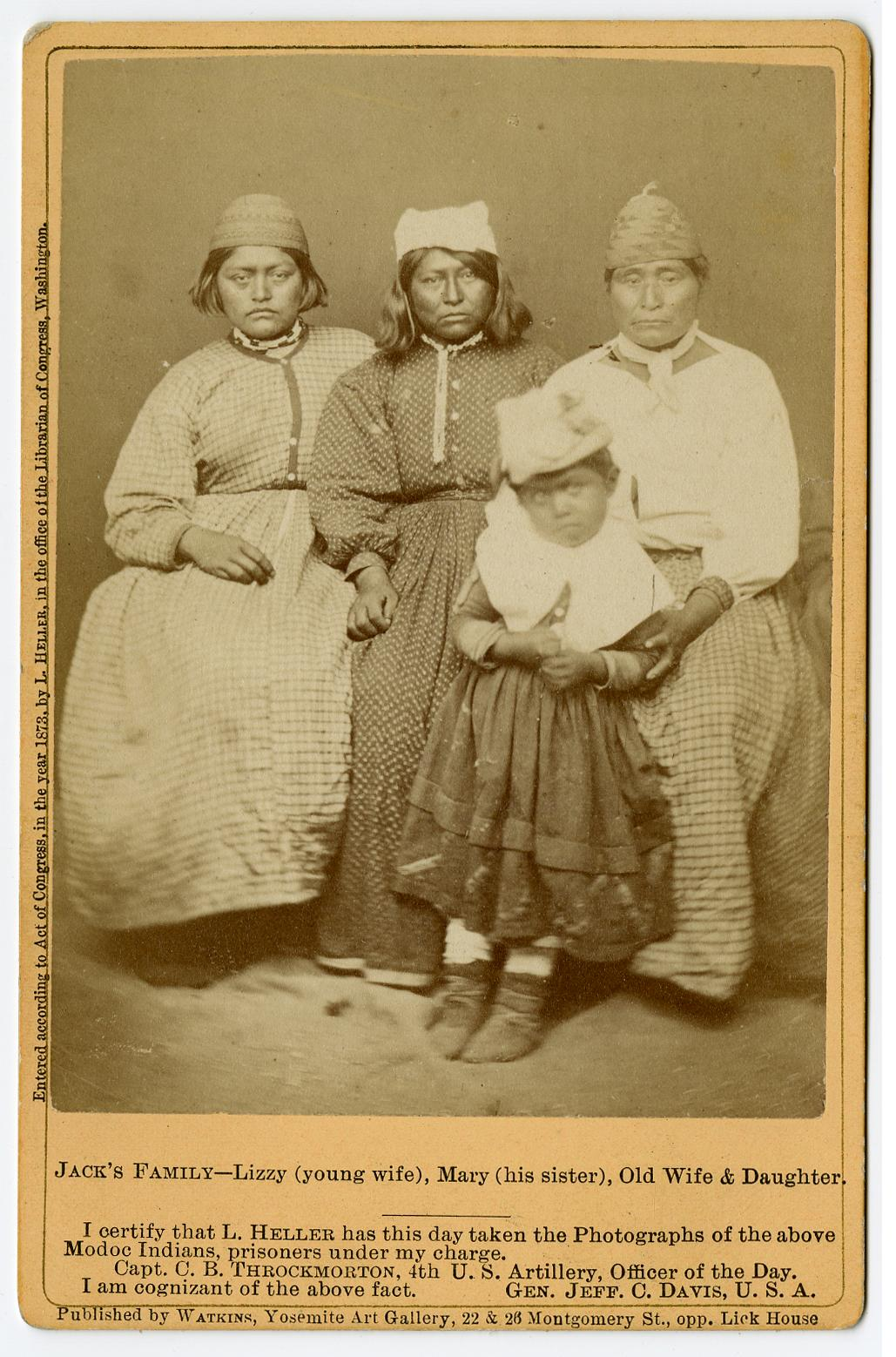
Jack's family—Lizzy (young wife), Mary (his sister), Old Wife and daughter

=== Rise to leadership ===
Kintpuash demonstrated diplomacy and pragmatism from an early age. He objected to his chief's calls for armed resistance against settlers and the U.S. government, believing that peaceful relations were essential for the tribe's survival. According to historian Gary Okihiro, citing Alfred B. Meacham's writings, in 1852, when Kintpuash was about fourteen, the bodies of eighteen white settlers were discovered in Modoc territory. California militia leader Ben Wright proposed a meeting with Modoc leaders under the pretense of peace talks. However, the meeting was a ruse, and Wright and his men massacred over forty Modocs, including their chief. Wright continued to other Modoc villages, destroying homes and displacing families. In the aftermath, Kintpuash rose to leadership, becoming the new chief of his people.

As chief, Kintpuash established friendships and trade relationships with settlers. The settlers in Yreka mockingly gave him the nickname Captain Jack. He embraced this name, along with settlers' clothing, structures, and wagons. Despite this, by the time of the U.S. Civil War, tensions between the Modocs and settlers had worsened. The Modocs occasionally killed settlers' livestock for food or used their horses without permission. While some settlers saw these actions as compensation for occupying Modoc land, others advocated for Modoc removal. Kintpuash attempted to balance diplomacy and resistance, building relationships with settlers while navigating escalating tensions.

== Modoc removal ==
=== Council Grove Treaty ===
In 1864, Indian Affairs officials in Oregon signed the Council Grove Treaty with the Klamath and an Oregon Modoc band, requiring relocation to the Klamath Indian Reservation. Under pressure, Kintpuash later signed the treaty to protect his California band. The treaty forfeited the Modocs' rights to their ancestral lands near Tule Lake and Lost River in California, granting them land at Klamath instead. However, the Modocs argued that Kintpuash had already signed an agreement with California Indian agents permitting them to remain in their homeland. Facing violence from settlers and government pressure, Kintpuash led his followers to the Klamath Reservation the following year.

Life at Klamath proved difficult. The allocated lands were insufficient for survival, and government efforts to assimilate the tribe through Christianity and capitalism caused further resentment. Rival Klamath tribesmen vandalized and stole from Modoc lands, and supplies promised in the treaty, including horses, wagons, and food, failed to reach the Modocs. Meanwhile, the larger Klamath tribe received federal provisions, further exacerbating tensions.

=== Return to Lost River ===
In 1865, Kintpuash led his band back to their ancestral home in California. Following the 1869 ratification of the Council Grove Treaty, the Modocs were promised new lands on the Klamath Reservation, and the U.S. government offered food and blankets as incentives for their return. While some Modocs voluntarily returned, forty-five were forcibly relocated. Conditions on the Klamath Reservation continued to be marked by harassment and assimilation efforts, leading to widespread dissatisfaction.

During this period, the Ghost Dance movement, a spiritual and cultural revival led by Paiute prophet Wovoka, spread among tribes in California, Nevada, and Oregon. The movement called for dancing, prayer, and fasting to bring about Native resurgence and the settlers' expulsion. While primarily a spiritual movement, it was also linked to armed resistance and efforts to restore Native sovereignty. This alignment of spiritual and political resistance echoed the broader struggles of the Modocs, who struggled to keep their homeland and autonomy.

In April 1870, conditions at Klamath prompted Kintpuash and approximately 370 Modocs to return to the Lost River Valley. Since newcomers overtook all fertile lands, the Modocs supplemented hunting and gathering by working for settlers. Viewing the departure as defiance, Federal Indian Commissioner Francis A. Walker ordered agents to return the Modocs to Klamath, authorizing the use of force if necessary. This directive set the stage for increased tensions and eventual war between the Modocs and the U.S.

== Modoc War, 1872–73 ==
=== Battle of Lost River ===
In the summer of 1872, after two years of the Modocs evading US military forces, the U.S. Indian Bureau once again demanded that the Modocs return to Klamath. Kintpuash refused and instead proposed the establishment of a reservation near Lost River. Although the Indian Bureau expressed openness to the idea, strong opposition from settlers effectively blocked any progress.

On November 29, 1872, an Army unit led by Major James Jackson surrounded Kintpuash's camp to enforce relocation. With no viable alternative, Kintpuash reluctantly agreed to return to Klamath but criticized Jackson's methods, stating that the soldiers’ early morning approach had frightened his people.

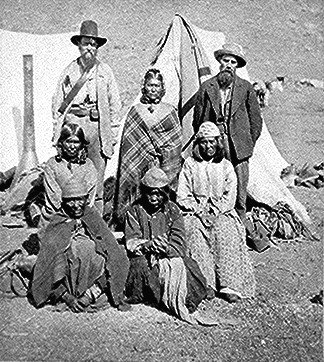
L to R, standing: US Indian agent, Winema (Toby) and her husband Frank Riddle; other Modoc women in front (1873)

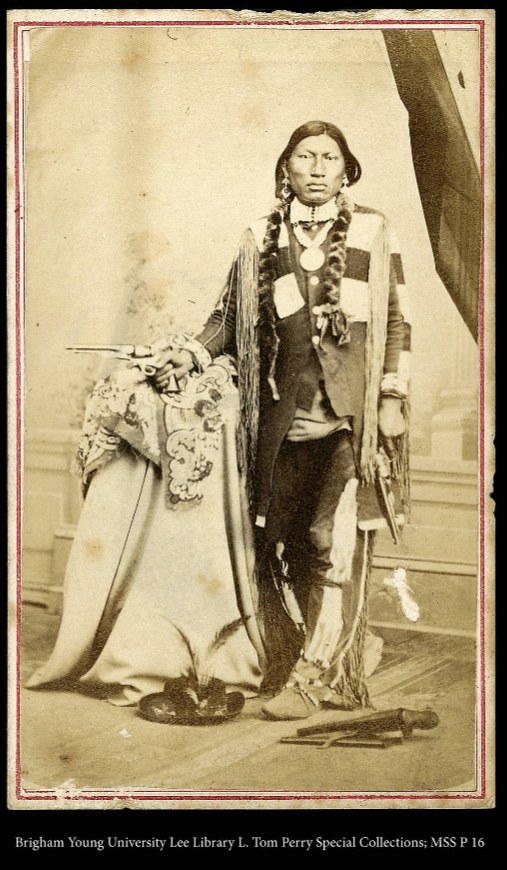
Portrait of Captain Jack, 2nd Chief.

During the disarmament process, Jackson instructed Kintpuash to set down his rifle ceremonially, so other warriors would follow suit. Most of his men also surrendered their weapons, but Scarfaced Charley, a Modoc leader, retained his pistol. When soldiers attempted to disarm him, Scarfaced Charley fired, sparking an exchange of gunfire. One soldier was killed, and others were wounded. Amid the chaos, Kintpuash and his people fled the camp and sought refuge in the nearby Lava Beds, a natural stronghold near Tule Lake.

The following morning, Jackson's forces pursued another Modoc Band led by Hooker Jim. At Hooker Jim's camp, soldiers killed an elderly woman and a baby. Enraged, Hooker Jim and his band retaliated, killing twelve settlers before fleeing to join Kintpuash in the Lava Beds. Kintpuash, distressed by these killings, feared he would be held accountable. The Battle of Lost River marked the beginning of the Modoc War, a conflict that highlighted the Modocs' struggle to retain their homeland and resist U.S. government policies.

=== Battle of the Stronghold ===
The Lava Beds National Monument in northern California served as a natural fortress for Kintpuash and his band during the Modoc War. The rugged volcanic terrain, later named Captain Jack's Stronghold provided significant defensive advantages. Women and children found shelter in the caves, while Modoc warriors used the terrain to resist Army attacks.

By January 16, over 300 U.S. soldiers arrived to confront the Modocs. Kintpuash advocated for surrender to protect his people, expressing willingness to face consequences alongside those responsible for the settlers' deaths. However, other influential Modoc leaders, including Hooker Jim and Curly Headed Doctor, opposed surrender. In a vote, only fourteen of the fifty-one Modoc warriors supported Kintpuash.

The Army launched an assault on the Modocs the following day. Using the terrain and camouflage, the Modocs repelled the attack, killing thirty-five U.S. soldiers and wounding many more without sustaining casualties. This unexpected defeat prompted the Army to request reinforcements. The battle demonstrated the Modocs' strategic use of their stronghold and their ability to resist overwhelming military pressure.

=== Peace commission ===
On February 28, 1873, Toby Riddle, a Modoc translator working in the employ of former Klamath Indian Agent Alfred Meacham, made contact with Kintpuash in advance of the Peace Commission at the Stronghold. The meeting relayed the desire of the American forces for complete surrender and the peaceful removal to the Klamath Reservation then relocated to a reservation in either Arizona or Indian Territory. Kintpuash refused.

In subsequent meetings, Meacham and John Fairchild attempted to negotiate the surrender of Hooker Jim and other wanted men for the killing of ranchers and militia in Lost River years prior. Kintpuash refused the demands, insisting that they were casualties of war and not crimes.

On March 6, 1873, Alfred Meacham received notification from the Bureau of Indian Affairs that they were fully authorized to meet Kintpuash's demands in a dispatch that explicitly said "Show these orders to Canby". Though there is no official record that Meacham showed the order to Canby it directly contrasted with General William Tecumseh Sherman's order to make an example out of the Modoc.

Before the April 11th Peace Commission meeting Toby Riddle was dispatched to the Lava Beds with a message offering safety for any Modoc who surrendered. Riddle was mocked by the Modoc headmen that met at the Stronghold rostrum, deciding to move forward in good faith with the Peace Commission meetings, maintaining their demands for restored homelands near the mouth of the Lost River and Tule Basin.

On Toby Riddle's return to the American encampment Meacham wrote that she warned the Modoc were plotting to assassinate the American negotiators. Accounts conflict, even against themselves as to whether or not the Peace Commission took measures based on this information.

=== Assassinations ===
A meeting with the commission was arranged for April 11, with both sides agreeing to attend unarmed. Meacham's own accounts in congress explain how the commission arrived unarmed and were surprised by the Modoc attack. Later his own have accounts describe how he and Frank Riddle fired back as he fled. Canby refused to attend meetings without his side arm and saber, regarding it as a proper and required piece of uniform.

On April 11, 1873, Kintpuash and key Modoc leaders—Hooker Jim, Shacknasty Jim, Black Jim, Schonchin John, and Ellen's Man—met with the peace commission. The commissioners were joined by Toby Riddle, her husband Frank Riddle, and interpreters Boston Charley and Bogus Charley. Kintpuash demanded the Modocs remain in their homelands and called for U.S. troops to withdraw.

Canby falsely replied that he lacked the authority to grant these requests, despite dispatches from the Bureau of Indian Affairs to the contrary. As it became clear that Canby would not meet their demands, shots were fired by one of the parties. The ensuing gunfight ended in the deaths Canby and Thomas. Meacham was badly beaten and wounded, while Dyar and Frank and Toby Riddles escaped without harm.

=== Capture ===
Three days later, the U.S. Army launched a massive assault on the area but was unable to locate the dispersed Modocs, who had scattered to avoid capture. However, their situation became increasingly dire as Toby Riddle informed the Americans how the Modoc were gaining access to water. Once the U.S. Army was able to cut off the Modoc supply of water, they ran out of water and provisions in mere weeks.

After the Modoc forces were scattered from the Stronghold, Hooker Jim and his band were captured north of Sand Butte. The Americans promised clemency for Kintpuash and others continuing to fight if they could be brought in peacefully. With his young daughters held prisoner and the Modoc no longer in a sustainable fighting position Hooker Jim set out to bring Kintpuash in. On May 27, Hooker Jim located Kintpuash and urged him to surrender. Days later, exhausted Kintpuash agreed to surrender voluntarily. He was wearing Canby's uniform and stated that he was tired and "his legs gave out".

This dramatic conclusion marked the end of the Modoc War, one of the most significant Native American uprisings of the 19th century. Kintpuash's resistance and eventual surrender remain a symbol of the Modoc struggle for their homeland and survival in the face of overwhelming odds.

== Trial and execution ==
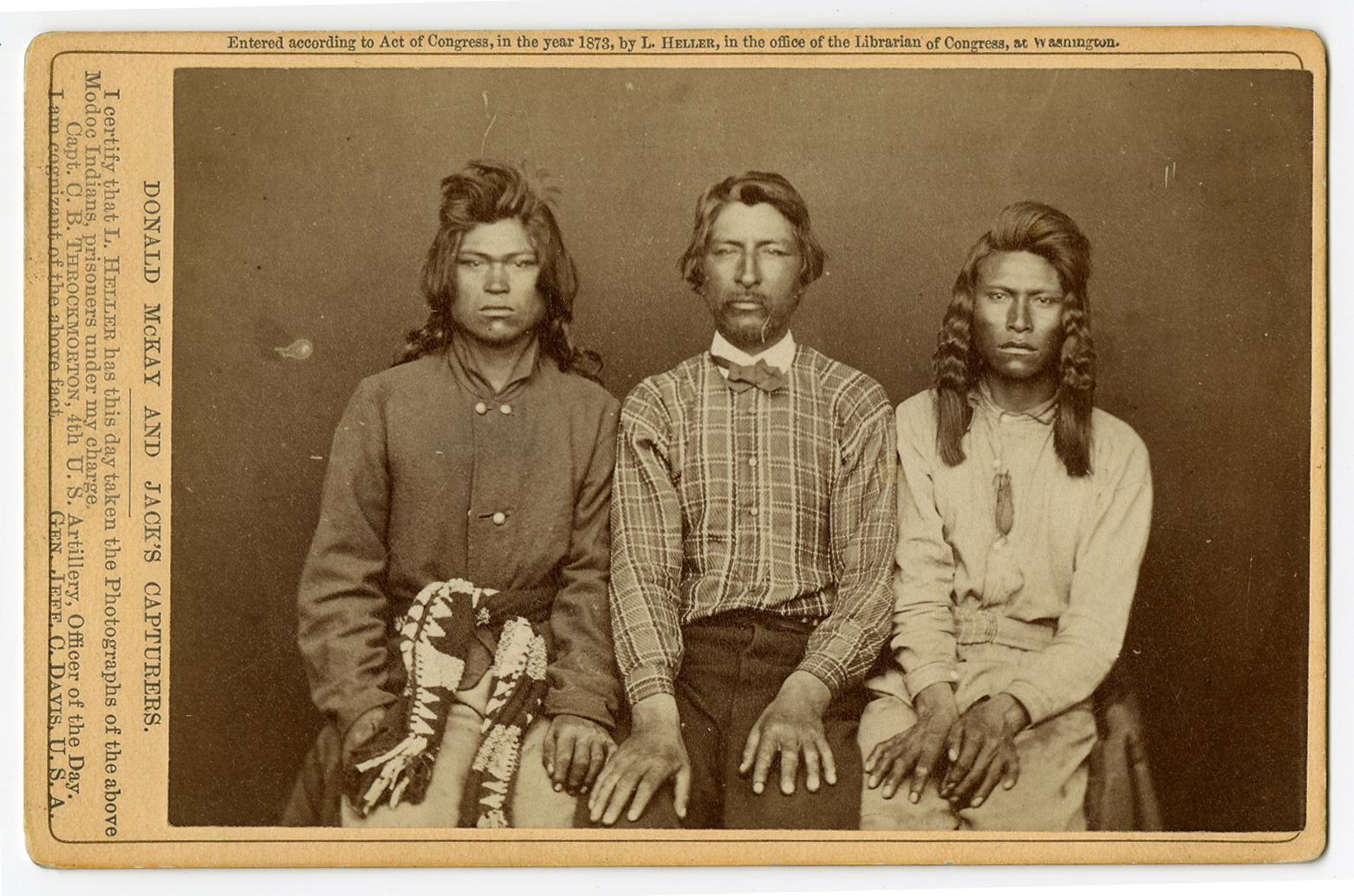
Donald McKay and Jack's capturers

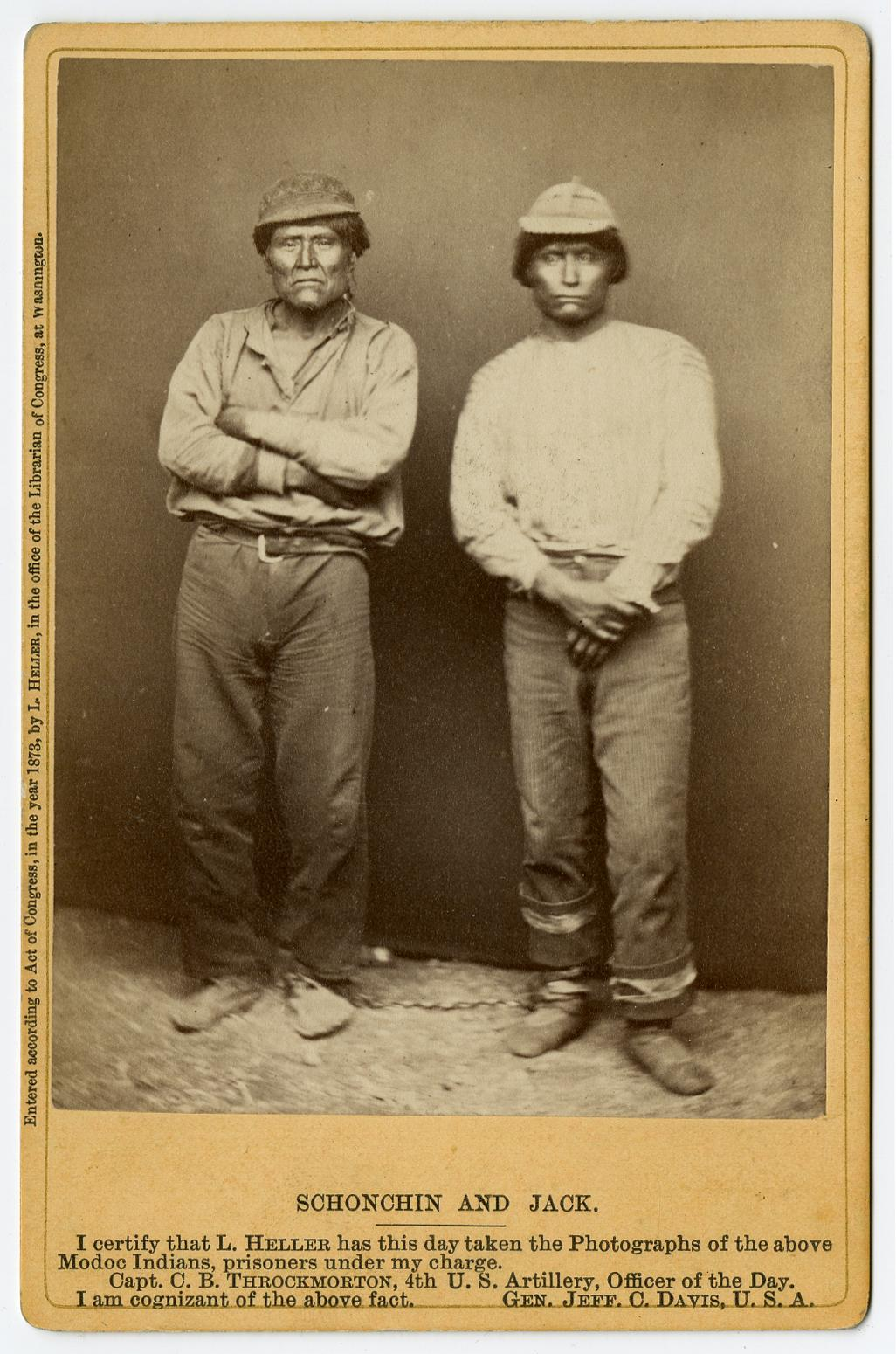
Schonchin and Jack

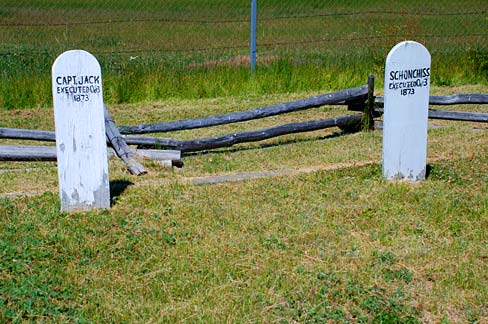
Captain Jack and Schonchin graves in 2009, Klamath County, Oregon

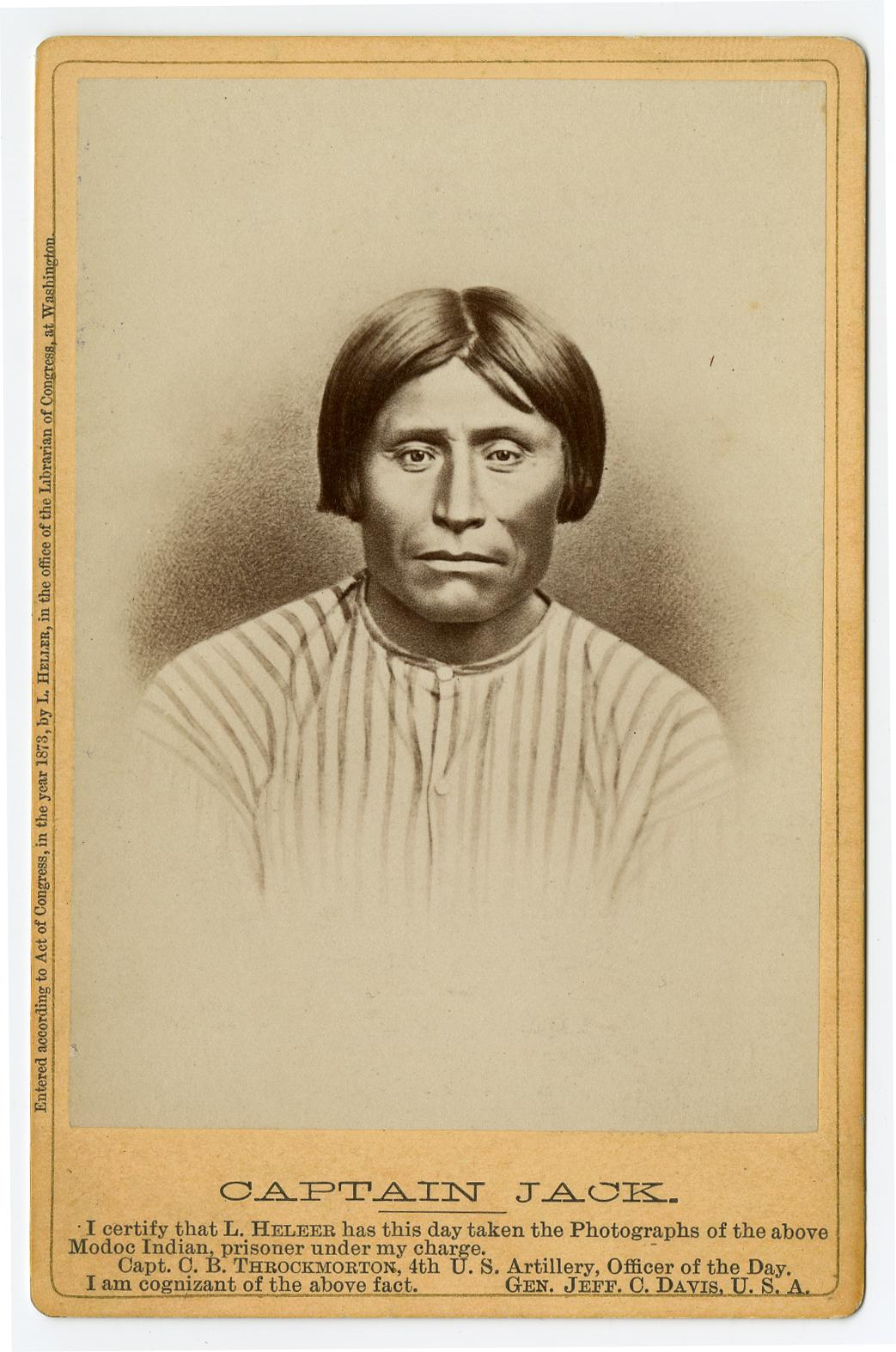
Repository – California Historical Society (15458104939)

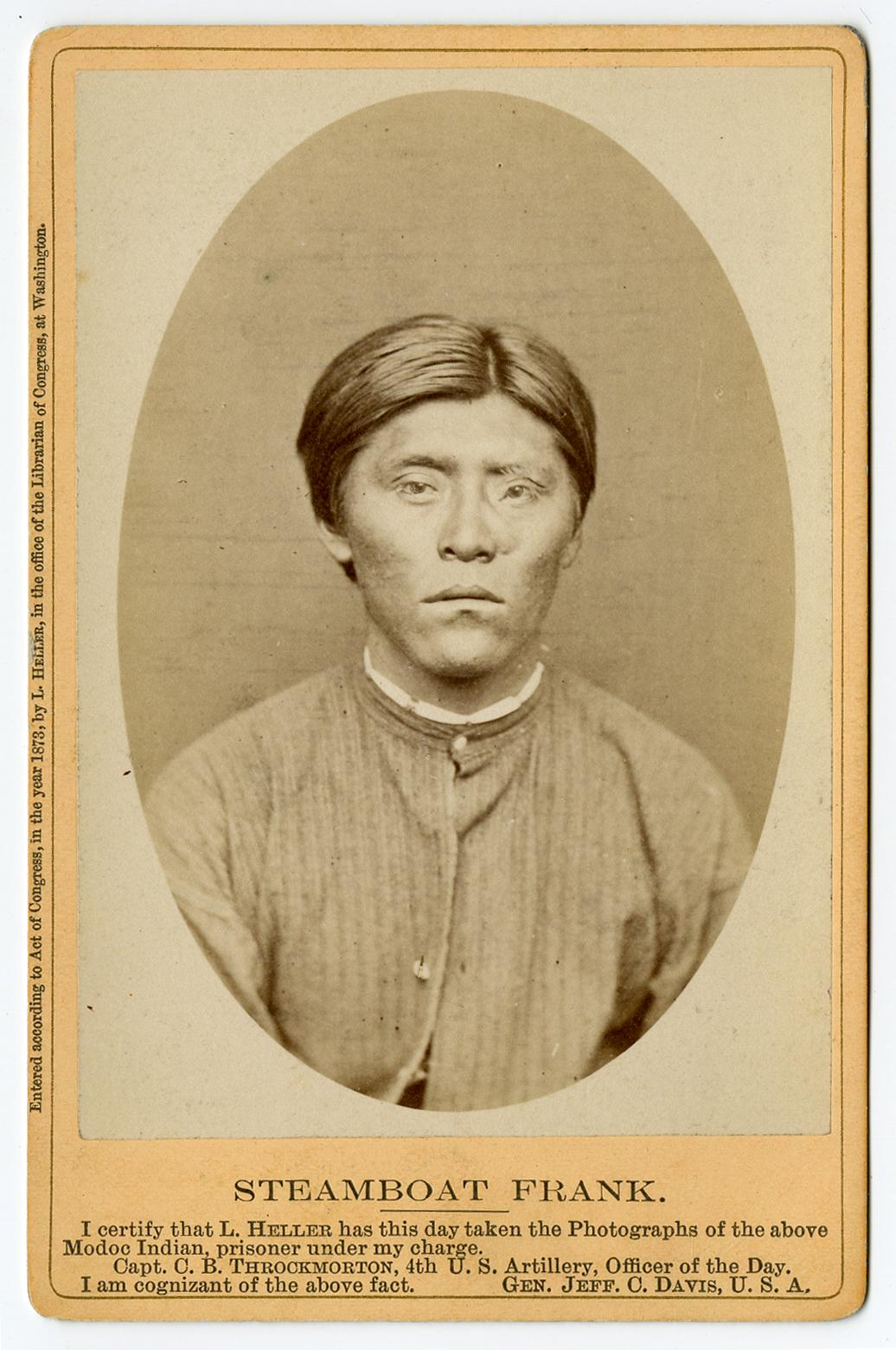
Portrait of Steamboat Frank

=== Reaction to assassinations ===
The death of Canby marked a grim milestone in U.S. history, as he became the first American general to be killed by Native Americans. General William Tecumseh Sherman used the death of Canby to justify earlier remarks that the annihilation the Modoc was justified.

Oregon militiamen attacked a wagon transporting captive Modocs, killing four men and one woman. None were prosecuted for the crimes. The events of the Modoc War remain a stark reminder of the complex and often brutal history of U.S. westward expansion and Native resistance.

At the urging of General Sherman, U.S. Attorney General George Henry Williams determined that the captured Modocs would be tried by a military tribunal, under the reasoning that they were prisoners of war from a sovereign nation engaged in conflict with the US. After the Modoc resistance was subdued, the remaining tribe members were transferred to Fort Klamath, where they were confined. During the trial, Kintpuash, Black Jim, Boston Charley, and two younger prisoners, Slolux and Barncho, were prosecuted.

=== Legal proceedings ===
The tribunal's judicial panel was composed of five officers, four of whom had been subordinates of Canby. According to historian Doug Foster, who also relied on Meacham's account as well as newspapers, this composition was biased, as these men had motivations to avenge their fallen commander. Additionally, the panel was appointed by Canby's replacement, General Jefferson C. Davis. However, the defendants, unfamiliar with the American legal system, did not object to the proceedings. Elija Steele, Kintpuash's friend from Yreka, sought to secure legal representation for the Modocs by requesting attorney E.J. Lewis. However, Lewis arrived on the trial's final day, and the court refused to reopen proceedings despite being notified in advance that counsel was on the way. This refusal further underscored the irregularities in the trial process.

Under court-martial regulations, the judge advocate was required to ensure the trial's fairness in the absence of legal representation and to prevent the defendants from unintentionally undermining their cases. However, these responsibilities were neglected. The judge advocate approved the commission without informing the defendants that they had the right to replace four out of the five judicial officers. Additionally, the court made no mention of the shackling of prisoners and the use of armed guards, both of which were discouraged by military regulations.

The defendants faced other significant disadvantages during the trial. Foster, citing Meacham, argued that the Modoc defendants were not proficient in English, and their translator, Frank Riddle, broke his neutrality by testifying against them. Out of ignorance of judicial procedures, Kintpuash presented his travel passes, believing they would demonstrate his good reputation among settlers. The military commission dismissed the passes as irrelevant. Kintpuash also argued that the Modocs did not initiate hostilities, stating that war was waged upon him and his people.

Prosecutors relied on the Council Grove Treaty of 1864 to argue their case but omitted mention of the unratified treaty that Kintpuash had signed months earlier. From the Modoc perspective, they had abandoned the second treaty because the U.S. government had already reneged on the first. Without legal representation, critical arguments were left unvoiced, such as the claim that no truce existed when Kintpuash killed Canby. The Modocs maintained that the Army broke the truce by confiscating their horses and encircling the Lava Beds. On April 5, Kintpuash had even notified the commission that the truce agreement had been violated.

Meanwhile, Hooker Jim and his three accomplices, who had betrayed Kintpuash and aligned with the U.S. government, were never tried, further demonstrating the disparity in justice. This was intended to reinforce the notion among Native Americans that working against their tribes in cooperation with the U.S. government could yield benefits. All the defendants—Kintpuash, Black Jim, Boston Charley, and Schonchin John—were found guilty and sentenced to death. However, President Grant commuted the sentences of the younger defendants, Barncho and Slolux, to life imprisonment after receiving appeals for clemency.

=== Execution ===
On October 3, 1873, the executions were carried out before a large crowd. The spectacle drew widespread attention, with even an Oregon school granting students a holiday to attend. The entire Modoc tribe was forced to witness the hanging of their leaders. The ropes used in the executions and strands of Kintpuash's hair were sold as souvenirs, reflecting the public's morbid fascination. This trial and its aftermath remain a striking example of the injustices faced by Native Americans in the 19th century, highlighting systemic inequities in both judicial and social spheres.

After the executions of Kintpuash and Schonchin John, their bodies were removed from the scaffold, and an Army surgeon decapitated them. The severed heads were sent to Washington, D.C., for scientific purposes. While the San Francisco Chronicle condemned the act as barbaric, the Army and Navy Journal justified it, claiming it was conducted for craniological research. For more than a century, the skulls of the two Modoc leaders were held in the collections of the Army Medical Museum and later transferred to the Smithsonian Institution.

== Exile and return ==
Following the executions, the remaining members of Kintpuash's band—comprising thirty-nine men, fifty-four women, and sixty children—were forcibly relocated to Oklahoma Territory. This transfer was intended as a warning to other Native American tribes and to prevent further resistance from the Modocs. In exile, harsh living conditions and disease took a heavy toll, claiming many lives. After decades of hardship, the U.S. government permitted the surviving Modocs to return to Oregon in 1909, where they were allowed to settle on the Klamath Reservation.

== Legacy ==
- The area where the Modoc established their defense is now known as Captain Jack's Stronghold. It is part of the protected area of the Lava Beds National Monument. There is a 2-mile trail through the Stronghold providing views from the Modoc lines and the Army's lines. Visitors can view the caves Captain Jack and Schonchin John used. There is a 3-mile hike out to the Thomas-Wright Battlefield in the Lava Beds giving visitors a view of the battlefield from the Modoc positions.
- Captain Jack Substation, a Bonneville Power Administration electrical substation, was named in honor of Kintpuash. It is located near what is now called Captain Jack's Stronghold. It forms the northern end of Path 66, a high-power electric transmission line.

== See also ==
- List of people executed in Oregon (pre-1972)
- Oliver Cromwell Applegate
