= Modoc people =

Native American people originally from northern California and Oregon

Modoc
- Toby "Winema" Riddle (Modoc, 1848–1920)

Total population
- 800 (2000)

Regions with significant populations
- United States
- Oregon: 600
- Oklahoma: 200
- California: 500

Languages
- English, formerly Modoc

Related ethnic groups
- Klamath, Yahooskin

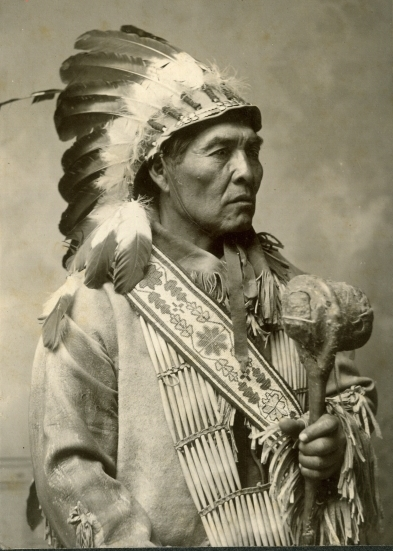
Photo of Modoc Yellow Hammer taken by Joseph Andrew Shuck before 1904. From the Lena Robitaille Collection at the Oklahoma Historical Society Photo Archives.

The Modoc are an Indigenous American people who historically lived in the area which is now northeastern California and central Southern Oregon. Currently, they include two federally recognized tribes, the Klamath Tribes in Oregon and the Modoc Tribe of Oklahoma, now known as the Modoc Nation.

== Language ==
The Modoc, like the neighboring Klamath, spoke varieties of the Klamathan/Lutuamian language, a branch of the proposed Plateau Penutian language family. Both peoples called themselves maklaks, meaning "people". To distinguish between the tribes, the Modoc called themselves Moatokni maklaks, from muat meaning "South". The Achomawi, a band of the Pit River tribe, called them Lutuami, meaning "Lake Dwellers".

== Current population and geography ==
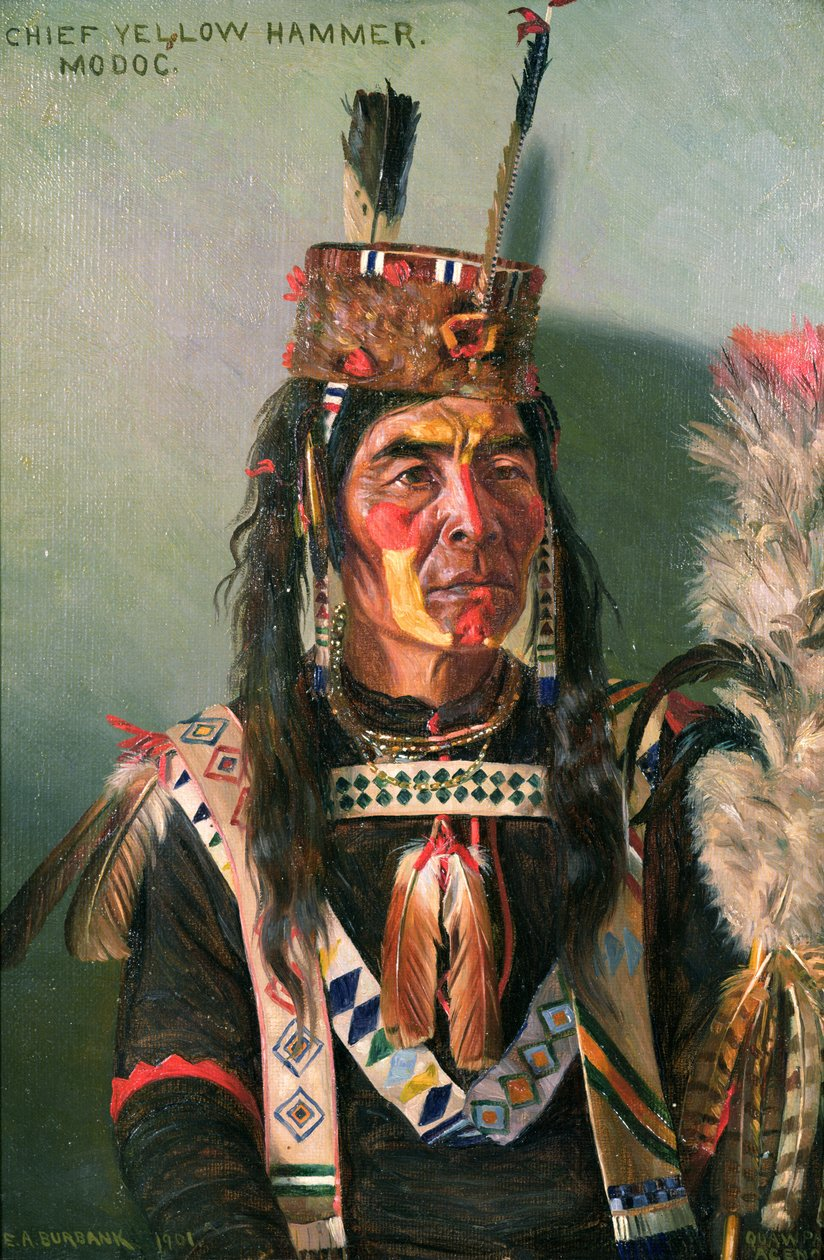
Chief Yellow Hammer painted in traditional clothing by E.A Burbank, 1901.

About 600 Modoc live in Klamath County, Oregon, in and around their ancestral homelands. This group includes those who stayed on the reservation during the Modoc War, as well as the descendants of those who chose to return in 1909 to Oregon from Indian Territory in Oklahoma or Kansas. Since that time, many have followed the path of the Klamath. The shared tribal government of the Klamath, Modoc and Yahooskin in Oregon is known as the Klamath Tribes.

Two hundred Modoc live in Oklahoma on a small reservation in Ottawa County, Oklahoma, that the federal government purchased for them. Originally they were placed on the Quapaw Indian Reservation in Oklahoma's far northeast corner. They are descendants of the band Captain Jack (Kintpuash) led during the Modoc War. The federal government officially recognized the Modoc Tribe of Oklahoma in 1978, and its constitution was approved in 1991.

== Early population ==
Estimates for the pre-contact populations of most Native groups in California have varied substantially. James Mooney put the aboriginal population of the Modoc at 400. Alfred L. Kroeber estimated the Modoc population within California as 500 at the year 1770. University of Oregon anthropologist Theodore Stern suggested that there had been a total of about 500 Modoc. In 1846, the population may have included "perhaps 600 warriors (an overestimate, probably)".

== History ==
=== Pre-contact ===
Until the 19th century, when European explorers first encountered the Modoc, like all Plateau Indians, they caught salmon during salmon runs and migrated seasonally to hunt and gather other food. In winter, they built earthen dugout lodges shaped like beehives, covered with sticks and plastered with mud, near lake shores with reliable sources of seeds from aquatic wokas plants and fishing.

==== Neighboring groups ====
In addition to the Klamath, with whom they shared a language and the Modoc Plateau, the groups neighboring the Modoc home were:

- Shasta on the Klamath River;
- Rogue River Athabaskans and Takelma west over the Cascade Mountains;
- Northern Paiute east in the desert;
- Karuk and Yurok further down the Klamath River; and
- Achomawi or Pit River to the south, in the meadows of the Pit River drainages.

The Modoc, Northern Paiute, and Achomawi shared Goose Lake Valley.

==== Settlements ====
The known Modoc village sites are Agawesh, where Willow Creek enters Lower Klamath Lake, of the Gombatwa·s or Lower Klamath Lake People Band; Kumbat and Pashha on the shores of Tule Lake of the Pasganwa·s or Tule Lake People Band; and Wachamshwash and Nushalt-Hagak-ni on the Lost River of the Goġewa·s or Lower Lost River People Band. The Modoc have also been known as the Modok (Brandt and Davis-Kimball xvi).

=== First contact ===
In the 1820s, Peter Skene Ogden, an explorer for the Hudson's Bay Company, established trade with the Klamath people north of the Modoc.

=== Applegate Trail established ===
Brothers Jesse and Lindsay Applegate, accompanied by 13 other white settlers, established the Applegate Trail, or South Emigrant Trail, in 1846. It connected a point on the Oregon Trail near Fort Hall, Idaho, and the Willamette Valley in western Oregon. The new route was created to encourage European-Americans to come to western Oregon, and to eliminate the hazards encountered on the Columbia Route. Since the Hudson's Bay Company controlled the Columbia Route, development of an alternate route enabled migration even if there was trouble between the United States and the United Kingdom. The Applegate brothers became the first known white people in present-day Lava Beds National Monument.

The opening of the Applegate Trail appeared to bring the first regular contact between the Modoc and the European-American settlers, who had largely ignored their territory before. Many of the events of the Modoc War took place along the trail.

=== Emigrant invasion ===
From 1846 to 1873, thousands of emigrants entered the Modoc territory. Beginning in 1847, the Modoc raided the invading emigrants on the Applegate Trail under the leadership of Old Chief Schonchin.

In September 1852, the Modoc destroyed an emigrant train at Bloody Point on the east shore of Tule Lake, killing all but three of the 65 people in the party. The Modoc took two young girls as captives. One or both of them may have been killed several years later by jealous Modoc women. The only man to survive the attack made his way to Yreka, California. After hearing his news, Yreka settlers organized a militia under Sheriff Charles McDermit, Jim Crosby, and Ben Wright. They went to the scene of the massacre to bury the dead and avenge their deaths. Crosby's party had a skirmish with a band of Modoc and returned to Yreka.

Wright and a small group stayed on to avenge the deaths. He was a notorious Indian hater. Accounts differ as to what took place when Wright's party met the Modoc on the Lost River, but most agree that Wright planned to ambush them, which he did in November 1852. Wright and his forces attacked, killing approximately 40 Modoc, in what came to be known as the "Ben Wright Massacre."

=== Treaty with the United States ===
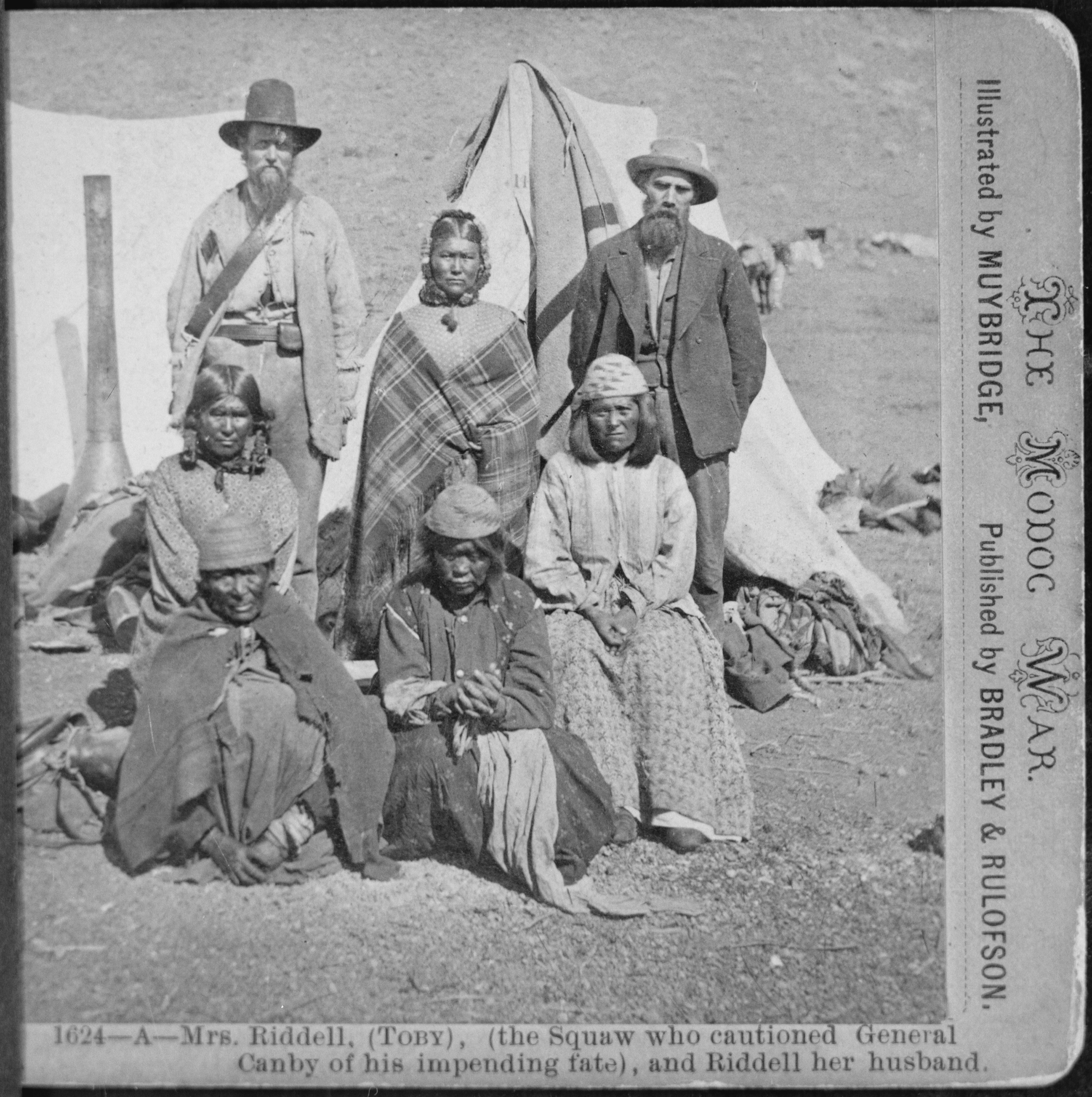
L to R, standing: US Indian agent, Winema (Tobey) Riddle, a Modoc; and her husband Frank Riddle, with four Modoc women sitting in the front two rows. Photographed by Eadweard Muybridge, 1873.

The United States, the Klamath, the Modoc, and the Yahooskin band of Snake tribes signed a treaty in 1864 that established the Klamath Reservation. It required the tribes to cede the land bounded on the north by the 44th parallel, on the west and south by the ridges of the Cascade Mountains, and on the east by lines touching Goose Lake and Henley Lake back up to the 44th parallel.

In return, the United States was to make a lump sum payment of $35,000, and annual payments totaling $80,000 over 15 years, as well as provide infrastructure and staff for a reservation. The treaty provided that if the Indians drank or stored intoxicating liquor on the reservation, the payments could be withheld and that the United States could locate additional tribes on the reservation in the future.

The treaty required that the Modoc surrender their lands near Lost River, Tule Lake, and Lower Klamath Lake in exchange for lands in the Upper Klamath Valley. They did so, under the leadership of Chief Schonchin. The Indian agent estimated the total population of the three tribes at about 2,000 when the treaty was signed.

The land of the reservation did not provide enough food for both the Klamath and the Modoc peoples. Illness and tension between the tribes increased. The Modoc requested a separate reservation closer to their ancestral home, but neither the federal nor the California government approved it.

In 1870 Kintpuash (also called Captain Jack) led a band of Modoc to leave the reservation and return to their traditional homelands. They built a village near the Lost River. These Modoc had not been adequately represented in the treaty negotiations and wished to end the harassment by the Klamath on the reservation.

=== Modoc War ===
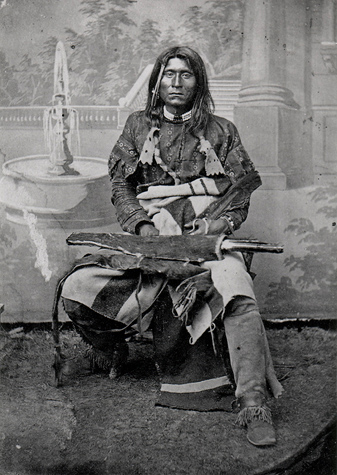
Kintpuash (Captain Jack), a Modoc leader in the Modoc War.

In November 1872, the U.S. Army was sent to Lost River to attempt to force Kintpuash's band back to the reservation. A battle broke out, and the Modoc escaped to what is called Captain Jack's Stronghold in what is now Lava Beds National Monument, California. The band of fewer than 53 warriors was able to hold off the 3,000 U.S. Army troops for several months, defeating them in combat several times. In April 1873, the Modoc left the Stronghold and began to splinter. Kintpuash and his group were the last to be captured, on June 4, 1873, when they voluntarily gave themselves up. U.S. government personnel had assured them that their people would be treated fairly and the warriors would be allowed to live on their own land.

The U.S. Army tried, convicted and executed Kintpuash and three of his warriors in October 1873 for the death of Major General Edward Canby earlier that year at a parley. The Army sent the rest of the band to Oklahoma as prisoners of war with Scarfaced Charley as their chief. The tribe's spiritual leader, Curley Headed Doctor, was also forced to remove to Indian Territory.

In the 1870s, Peter Cooper brought Indians to speak to Indian rights groups in eastern cities. One of the delegations was from the Modoc and Klamath tribes. In 1909, the group in Oklahoma was given permission to return to Oregon. Several people did, but most stayed at their new home.

== Culture ==
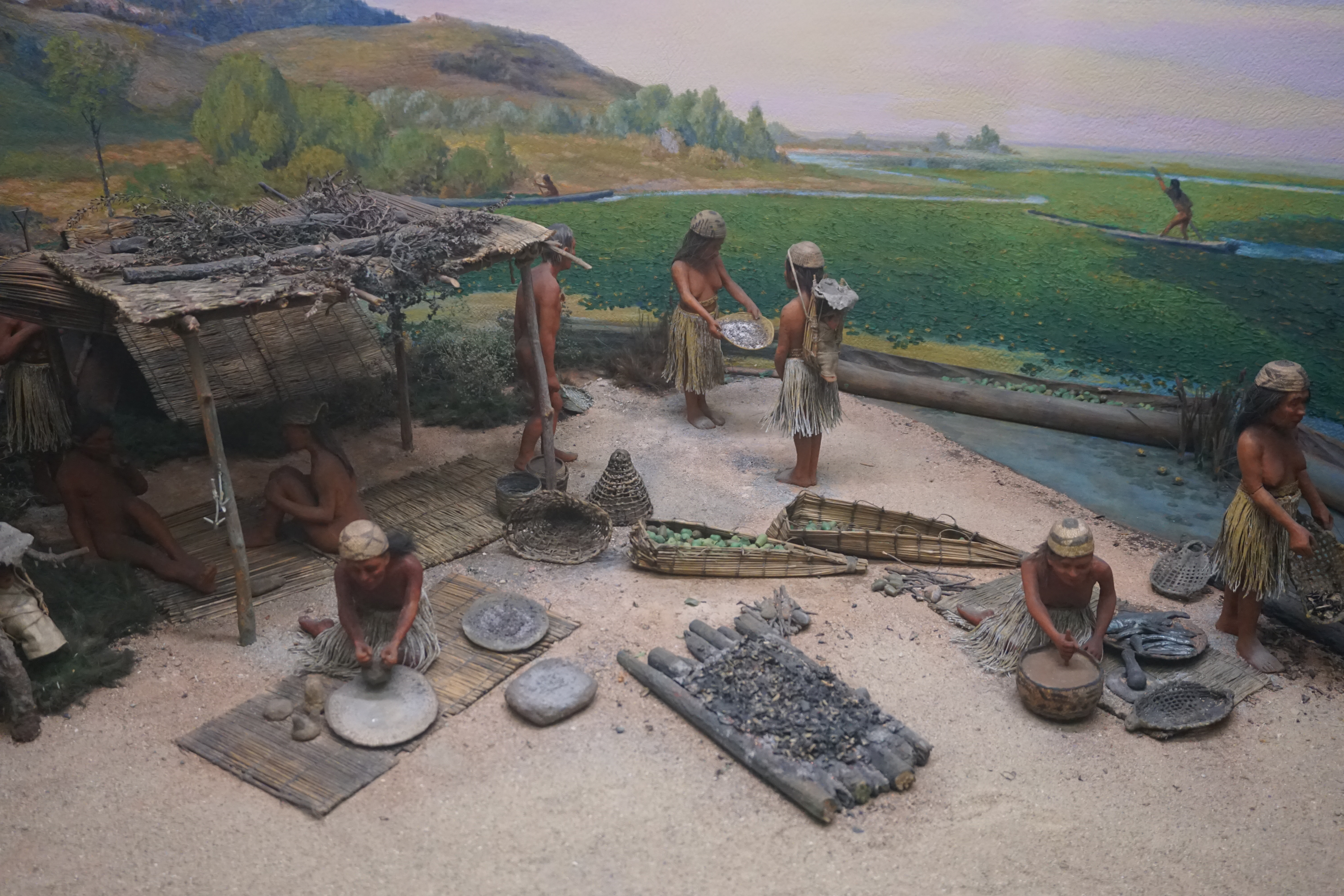
A Modoc Harvest diorama at the Milwaukee Public Museum

The religion of the Modoc is not known in detail. The number five figured heavily in ritual, as in the Shuyuhalsh, a five-night dance rite of passage for adolescent girls. A sweat lodge was used for purification and mourning ceremonies.

=== Kumush ===
Kumush (also Kemush, Kmukamtch, K'mukamtch, Gmok'am'c, Gmo'Kamc, or Kumukumts) is the Modoc spirit of creation.

Kumush created the Modoc tribe, gave things names and California as a country for their home. Kumush created the Modoc and named the Native American tribes, designating Mount Shasta and Tule Lake as the Modoc Garden of Eden.

==== Variation, Transmission and Contemporary Engagement ====
The Modoc creation account concerning Kumush exists in multiple recorded versions, and the differences among them reflect the living nature of oral tradition. A creation story carried across generations is not a fixed text. It is told by different speakers, in different circumstances, to different listeners, and shaped by what each telling needs to convey. Variation is not corruption of the tradition. Variation is the tradition.

The earliest widely cited published version of the Kemush creation account was recorded by the ethnographer Jeremiah Curtin in Myths of the Modocs, published in 1912 from fieldwork conducted in the late nineteenth century. Curtin presents Kemush as the old man of the ancients, descending into the underground spirit world with his daughter, gathering bones into a basket after six days and six nights, stumbling twice on the climb back to the upper world, and scattering the bones as peoples upon his return. Albert Gatschet's earlier The Klamath Indians of Southwestern Oregon (1890) records related material in different form, with different emphases, drawn from the speakers and translators available to him during his fieldwork in the 1870s. The peoples named, the order in which they are named, and the words attributed to Kemush vary across these recorded versions and across the social and political conditions in which each was transcribed.

Modoc man.

Contemporary Modoc tradition, as published by the Modoc Nation, preserves the central architecture of the account — the underground journey, the council of the spirit guides, the basket of bones, the scattering and naming of the peoples — while presenting Kemush, and particularly his final charge to the Modoc, in terms that center the relationship between Kemush and the Modoc as one of inheritance, stewardship, and survival. The settler ethnographers of the late nineteenth and early twentieth centuries recorded what they were told by the speakers who agreed to speak with them, in English translation, often through intermediaries, within the constraints of their own categories of myth and legend. Their work is a partial record. The living tradition remains with the Modoc themselves. The continuation of that tradition into contemporary Modoc-authored literature is part of the same lineage of telling.

The Book of Spirals: Native Myths of the American West (2025), by the Modoc author H. L. Delaney, presents a twelve-part cycle of mythic narratives — the Spirals of Creation, Illusion, Change, Death, Hunger, Kinship, Greed, Pride, Brothers, Cold, Purpose, and Memory — through which Kemush moves as protagonist, witness, and bearer of memory. Delaney's cycle draws on the ecological and narrative inheritance of the Klamath Basin and the oral-historical patterns carried within his family and community. Within the cycle, Kemush appears as a culture hero and cosmological mediator — a figure whose identity emerges through encounter, transformation, grief, and the keeping of memory, who stands among elemental forces such as Darkness, Hunger, Death, Cold, Silence, and the catastrophic mountain Mazama, negotiating with them rather than ruling over them. The cycle's recurring concerns include first breath as the originating disturbance, predation as cosmic principle, recursion as the means by which truth is relearned, and memory as the cosmological force that prevents the world from returning to darkness.

This contemporary articulation of Kemush stands in continuity with the older recorded versions rather than apart from them. The figure named the bravest of all in the Modoc Nation's account, the figure who stumbled and persisted on the climb out of the underground in Curtin's account, and the figure who breathes against the first darkness and learns through grief in The Book of Spirals are versions of the same Kemush, told by different tellers across different generations. The settler ethnography preserved a partial record of the tradition during a period of attempted erasure through pan-tribal flattening and confederation. The contemporary Modoc tradition keeps it alive in community. Modoc-authored literary work returns the figure to the people whose ancestors first told the stories, in the medium of the present.

== Namesakes ==
Modoc Plateau, Modoc National Forest, Modoc County, California; Modoc, Indiana; and numerous other places are named after this group of people.

== See also ==
- Modoc traditional narratives
- Indigenous peoples of California

== Notes ==
- Arnold, James R.; Tucker, Spencer C.; Wiener, Roberta, eds. (2011). The Encyclopedia of North American Indian Wars, 1607–1890. Vol. 1. Santa Barbara, California: ABC-CLIO. ISBN 978-1-85109-697-8. OCLC 838905208.
- Barr, Tom (2012). Scenic Routes & Byways: Oregon. Guilford, Connecticut: Globe Pequot Press. ISBN 978-0-7627-7956-7. OCLC 756579553.
- Grubbs, Bruce (2006). Hiking Nevada: A Guide to Nevada's Greatest Hiking Adventures (Second ed.). Helena, Montana: Falcon Press. ISBN 978-0-7627-3417-7. OCLC 70915489.
- Heard, Joseph Norman (1997). Handbook of the American Frontier: Four Centuries of Indian-White Relationships. Native American Resources series. Vol. IV. Lanham, Maryland: Scarecrow Press. ISBN 9780810832831. OCLC 498503287.
- Kessel, William B.; Wooster, Robert, eds. (2005). Encyclopedia of Native American Wars and Warfare. New York, New York: Facts on File. ISBN 0-8160-3337-4. OCLC 44509237.
- Kroeber, Alfred Louis (1976) [1925]. Handbook of the Indians of California. Bulletin (Smithsonian Institution. Bureau of American Ethnology). New York, New York: Dover Publications. ISBN 9780486233680. OCLC 2972541.
- Michno, Gregory F.; Michno, Susan J. (2009). Circle the Wagons!: Attacks on Wagon Trains in History and Hollywood Films. Jefferson, North Carolina: McFarland & Company. ISBN 978-0-7864-3997-3. OCLC 231671302.
- Murray, Keith A. (1959). The Modocs and Their War. The Civilization of the American Indian. Norman, Oklahoma: University of Oklahoma Press. ISBN 9780806113319.
- Neiderheiser, Leta Lovelace (2010). Jesse Applegate: A Dialogue With Destiny. Mustang, Oklahoma: Tate Publishing & Enterprises. ISBN 978-1-61739-229-0. OCLC 701809610.
- Pease, Robert W. (1965). "Modoc County". University of California Publications in Geography. 17. Berkeley and Los Angeles, California: University of California Press. ISSN 0068-6441. OCLC 3714154.
- Philip, Neil (2006). The Great Circle: A History of the First Nations. New York, New York: Clarion Books. ISBN 978-0-618-15941-3. OCLC 62330691.
- Ruby, Robert H.; Brown, John A. (1981). Indians of the Pacific Northwest: A History. The Civilization of the American Indian. Norman, Oklahoma: University of Oklahoma Press. ISBN 0-8061-2113-0. OCLC 7272798.
- Ruby, Robert H.; Brown, John A.; Collins, Cary C. (2013). A Guide to the Indian Tribes of the Pacific Northwest. The Civilization of the American Indian (Fourth ed.). Norman, Oklahoma: University of Oklahoma Press. ISBN 978-0-8061-4024-7.
- Stern, Theodore (June 1998). "Klamath and Modoc". In Walker, Deward E.; Sturtevant, William C. (eds.). Handbook of North American Indians. Vol. 12, Plateau. Washington, D.C.: Smithsonian Institution. pp. 446–456. ISBN 0-16-049514-8. OCLC 39401371.
- Thrapp, Dan L. (1988). Encyclopedia of Frontier Biography. Vol. III. Lincoln, Nebraska: University of Nebraska Press. ISBN 9780803294202. OCLC 23583099.
- U.S. Department of Agriculture (2004). Soil Survey of Douglas County Area, Oregon: Part I. Washington, D.C.: Natural Resources Conservation Service. OCLC 58436713.
- U.S. Office of Indian Affairs (1865). Report of the Commissioner of Indian Affairs: for the Year 1865. Washington, D.C.: Government Printing Office. OCLC 10495312.
- Waldman, Carl (2006). Encyclopedia of Native American Tribes (Third ed.). New York, New York: Checkmark Books. ISBN 978-0-8160-6273-7. OCLC 67361229.
- Walling, Albert G. (1884). Illustrated History of Lane County, Oregon. Portland, Oregon: Printing house of A.G. Walling. ISBN 9780598541451. OCLC 16696100.
