= Kuma =

Kuma or KUMA may refer to:

== Characters ==
- Kuma, a bear, also known as Teddie in English localization of Persona 4
- Kuma (Tekken), father and son characters of the same name in the Tekken franchise
- Kuma Lisa, an archetypal character from Bulgarian and Russian folklore
- Bartholomew Kuma, a character in the Japanese anime and manga One Piece
- Pedobear (Japanese: Kumā (クマー)), a mascot of website 2channel

== Radio stations ==
- KUMA (AM), a radio station (1290 AM) in Pendleton, Oregon, United States
- KUMA-FM, a radio station (92.1 FM) in Pilot Rock, Oregon, United States
- KWVN-FM, a radio station (107.7 FM) in Pendleton, Oregon, United States, previously known as KUMA-FM
- KUMA (Arizona), a defunct radio station in Yuma, Arizona, United States

== Places ==
=== Japan ===
- Kuma, Ehime, a former town
- Kuma, Kumamoto, a village
- Kuma District, Kumamoto, Japan
- Kuma River (Japan)
- Mount Kuma, a stratovolcano

=== Myanmar ===
- Kuma, Myanmar, a town

=== Russia ===
- Kuma (Russia), a river in the Northern Caucasus
- Kuma, Republic of Dagestan, a rural locality in Dagestan, Russia

== People ==
- Kuma Demeksa (born 1958), Ethiopian politician
- Abera Kuma (born 1990), Ethiopian long-distance runner
- Eyerusalem Kuma (born 1981), Ethiopian long-distance runner
- Kengo Kuma (born 1954), Japanese architect

== Technology ==
- Kuma (processor), an Athlon X2 core based on Phenom CPU
- Kuma (ship), a Kuma class Imperial Japanese Navy cruiser
  - Kuma-class cruiser, light cruisers operated by the Imperial Japanese Navy

== Other uses ==
- 6255 Kuma, a main-belt asteroid
- Kuma (film), a 2012 film directed by Umut Dag
- Kuma (star), a traditional name for the star Nu Draconis
- Kuma Reality Games, a video game developer
- Kuma (Cap), a traditional Omani cap
- Kuma (acoel), a genus of acoels in the family Proporidae

== See also ==
- Cuma (disambiguation)
