= KUMA =

KUMA may refer to:

- KUMA (AM), a radio station (1290 AM) licensed to Pendleton, Oregon, United States
- KUMA-FM, a radio station (92.1 FM) licensed to serve Pilot Rock, Oregon, United States
- KWVN-FM, a radio station (107.7 FM) licensed to Pendleton, Oregon, United States, known as KUMA-FM from 1978 to 1989 and 1993 to 2010
- KUMA (Arizona), a radio station in Yuma, Arizona, United States, that operated from 1925 to 1940
