= Cuma =

Cuma or CUMA may refer to:

== Places and jurisdictions ==
In Europe

- Cuma (Euboea), former name of Kymi, a coastal town on Euboea island, Greece
- Cuma (Italy), an ancient Greek colony, near Naples
  - its Diocese of Cuma (Italy), former bishopric and present Latin titular see
- Monte di Cuma, a mountain near Licola, Italy, in Naples province
- Cuma-ı Bala, an old Turkish name for Blagoevgrad in Bulgaria
- Eski Cuma, an old Turkish name for Targovishte in Bulgaria

Elsewhere

- Cuma (Aeolis), an Aeolian city in Asia Minor
  - its Diocese of Cuma (Asia Minor), former bishopric and present Latin titular see
- Cuma, Azerbaijan, a village in Azerbaijan
- Cuma, Namibia, a village in the Rundu Rural East constituency of Namibia

== People ==
- Tyler Cuma, a Canadian major junior ice hockey defenceman
- Cuman people, nomadic people in Eurasia

== Mythology ==
- Čuma, a personification of plague in Serbian mythology

== Abbreviations ==
- CUMA, a type of frogman's rebreather designed and made in Canada
- Canadian Urban Music Awards, awards given by the Urban Music Association of Canada

== See also ==
- Kuma (disambiguation)
- Kymi (disambiguation)
