= KJDY =

KJDY may refer to:

- KJDY (AM), a radio station (1400 AM) licensed to John Day, Oregon, United States
- KJDY-FM, a radio station (94.5 FM) licensed to Canyon City, Oregon, United States
