= KJDY (AM) =

- John Day, Oregon; United States
- Frequency: 1400 kHz

Programming
- Format: Country

Ownership
- Owner: Randolph and Debra McKone, Elkhorn Media Group; (KJDY, LLC)
- Sister stations: KJDY-FM (simulcast), KCMB, KVBL, KWRL

History
- First air date: December 13, 1963
- Call sign meaning: John DaY

Technical information
- Licensing authority: FCC
- Facility ID: 5917
- Class: C
- Power: 1,000 watts (unlimited)
- Transmitter coordinates: 44°25′17″N 118°57′09″W

Links
- Public license information: Public file; LMS
- Webcast: http://player.listenlive.co/46411
- Website: http://www.myeasternoregon.com/

KJDY (1400 AM) is a radio station licensed to serve John Day, Oregon, United States. The station, which began broadcasting in 1963, is currently owned by Randolph and Debra McKone, through licensee KJDY, LLC.

== Programming ==
KJDY broadcasts a locally-oriented full-service country music format. Syndicated programming from Premiere Radio Networks including After Midnite with Blair Garner hosted by Blair Garner and American Top 40 hosted by Ryan Seacrest.

== History ==
Launched on December 13, 1963, this station was assigned the KJDY call sign by the Federal Communications Commission. KJDY was the first radio station licensed to serve Grant County, Oregon. Licensed to John Day Valley Broadcasters, the station was initially authorized to broadcast with 1,000 watts of power during the day and 250 watts at night.

John Day Valley Broadcasters sold the station to Theodore A. Smith in a transaction that was consummated on February 19, 1975. Seven years later, in February 1982, station owner Theodore A. Smith applied to the FCC to transfer the broadcast license for KJDY to Pendleton Broadcasting Company. The transfer was approved by the FCC on March 18, 1982.

In September 1987, Pendleton Broadcasting Company reached an agreement to sell this station to the Blue Mountain Broadcasting Company. The deal was approved by the FCC on October 26, 1987, and the transaction was consummated on December 1, 1987.

Effective October 6, 2015, KJDY, sister station KJDY-FM, and translator K229AX were sold to KJDY, LLC, at a purchase price of $405,000.
