= Pendleton High School =

Pendleton High School may refer to:

- Pendleton High School (Indiana), Pendleton, Indiana
- Pendleton High School (Falmouth, Kentucky), Falmouth, Kentucky
- Pendleton High School (Oregon), Pendleton, Oregon
- Pendleton High School (South Carolina), Pendleton, South Carolina
- Pendleton School, Bradenton, Florida
