= 6255 Kuma =

Asteroid

Discovery
- Discovered by: A. Nakamura
- Discovery site: Kuma Kogen Obs.
- Discovery date: 5 December 1994

Designations
- Named after: Kuma, Ehime (Japanese town)
- Alternative designations: 1994 XT · 1975 VJ_{8} 1981 DV_{3} · 1986 EB_{2} 1988 SU_{4} · 1989 WP_{3} 1992 OL_{1}
- Minor planet category: main-belt · (middle)

Orbital characteristics
- Epoch 4 September 2017 (JD 2458000.5)
- Uncertainty parameter 0
- Observation arc: 41.37 yr (15,110 days)
- Aphelion: 2.8302 AU
- Perihelion: 2.6527 AU
- Semi-major axis: 2.7414 AU
- Eccentricity: 0.0324
- Orbital period (sidereal): 4.54 yr (1,658 days)
- Mean anomaly: 37.407°
- Mean motion: 0° 13^{m} 1.56^{s} / day
- Inclination: 5.1205°
- Longitude of ascending node: 275.38°
- Argument of perihelion: 193.11°

Physical characteristics
- Dimensions: 15.53±3.67 km 15.74±5.52 km 16.955±0.135 km 17.86±0.52 km 21.50±9.05 km 22.67 km (derived); 22.72±1.7 km (IRAS:3)
- Synodic rotation period: 9.70±0.01 h (Note: Lightcurve plot of 6255 Kuma. Palmer Divide Observatory, B. D. Warner (2006). Summary figures at Collaborative Asteroid Lightcurve Link (CALL))
- Geometric albedo: 0.0238 (derived); 0.029±0.029; 0.0342±0.006 (IRAS:3); 0.04±0.03; 0.058±0.004; 0.060±0.001
- Spectral type: C
- Absolute magnitude (H): 12.5 · 12.80 · 12.9 · 13.09

6255 Kuma, provisional designation 1994 XT, is a carbonaceous asteroid from the central region of the asteroid belt, approximately 22 kilometers in diameter. It was discovered on 5 December 1994, by Japanese astronomer Akimasa Nakamura at Kuma Kogen Astronomical Observatory on the Island of Shikoku, Japan. It was named after the Japanese town of Kumakōgen.

== Classification and orbit ==
Kuma is a dark asteroid that orbits the Sun in the central main-belt at a distance of 2.7–2.8 AU once every 4 years and 6 months (1,658 days). Its orbit has an eccentricity of 0.03 and an inclination of 5° with respect to the ecliptic. The first precovery was taken at Crimea–Nauchnij in 1975, extending the asteroid's observation arc by 19 years prior to its discovery.

== Physical characteristics ==
Kuma is an assumed carbonaceous C-type asteroid.

=== Rotation period ===
In September 2006, a rotational lightcurve of Kuma was obtained from photometric observations by American astronomer Brian Warner at the Palmer Divide Observatory (716) in Colorado. Lightcurve analysis gave a rotation period of 9.70 hours with a brightness amplitude of 0.15 magnitude (U=2).

=== Diameter and albedo ===
According to the space-based surveys carried out by the Infrared Astronomical Satellite IRAS, the Japanese Akari satellite, and NASA's Wide-field Infrared Survey Explorer with its NEOWISE mission, Kuma measures between 15.53 and 22.72 kilometers in diameter, and its surface has a low albedo in the range of 0.029 to 0.06.

The Collaborative Asteroid Lightcurve Link derives an even lower albedo of 0.02 and a diameter of 22.7 kilometers using an absolute magnitude of 12.9.

== Naming ==
This minor planet was named after the Japanese rural town Kuma (now Kumakōgen, Ehime), home of the discovering observatory that was built in 1992 for astronomical education and tourism. Kuma is located on the Japanese island of Shikoku, after which the minor planet 4223 Shikoku is named. The town supports local cultural activities and is a significant destination for pilgrims. The approved naming citation was published by the Minor Planet Center on 14 May 1995 (M.P.C. 25231).
