= Kymmene =

Kymmene may refer to:

- Kymmene River
- Kymmene Valley
- Kymmene Corporation

== See also ==
- Kymi (disambiguation)
