= KTIX =

- Pendleton, Oregon; United States
- Frequency: 1240 kHz
- Branding: The Ticket

Programming
- Format: Sports
- Affiliations: Fox Sports Radio

Ownership
- Owner: Elkhorn Media Group; (EMG2, LLC)
- Sister stations: KCMB, KTEL, KUMA, KUMA-FM, KWHT, KWRL, KWVN-FM

History
- First air date: May 1941 (as KWRC)
- Former call signs: KWRC (1941–1959); KKID (1959–1964)
- Call sign meaning: sounds like "Ticket"

Technical information
- Licensing authority: FCC
- Facility ID: 643
- Class: C
- Power: 800 watts
- Transmitter coordinates: 45°41′06″N 118°51′17″W
- Translator: 103.1 K276GF (Pendleton)

Links
- Public license information: Public file; LMS
- Webcast: Listen Live
- Website: elkhornmediagroup.com/columbia-basin/

KTIX (1240 AM, "The Ticket") is a radio station licensed to serve Pendleton, Oregon, United States. The station, which began broadcasting as KWRC in May 1941, is currently owned by Randolph and Debra McKone's Elkhorn Media Group and the broadcast license is held by EMG2, LLC.

== Programming ==
KTIX previously broadcast a 24-hour sports radio format as an affiliate of ESPN Radio from October 2002 through at least early 2018. The station has since switched affiliation to Fox Sports Radio. In addition to its usual sports talk programming, KTIX broadcasts Major League Baseball games as an affiliate of the Seattle Mariners Radio Network, National Basketball Association games as a member of the Portland Trail Blazers radio network, National Football League games as a member of the Seattle Seahawks radio network, and Oregon Ducks football as a member of the Oregon Sports Network. KTIX also airs high school football games and other select sporting events featuring the Pendleton High School Buckaroos.

== Facilities ==
KTIX shares a studio building with sister stations KUMA (1290 AM), KUMA-FM (107.7 FM), and KWHT (103.5 FM). This multi-station facility, located at the west end of Eastern Oregon Regional Airport, is also close to KTIX's new tower site. The original tower, located on South Hill, served KTIX from 1941 to 2002. That original tower was later re-erected east of Pendleton on Cabbage Hill for use by co-owned KUMA-FM.

== History ==
=== The beginning ===
This station began regular broadcast operations in May 1941 with 250 watts of power on 1240 kHz as KWRC under the ownership of the Western Radio Corporation. KWRC was run by general manager V.P. Kenworthy who owned the Western Radio Corporation as part of the Kenworthy Stations Group. V.P. Kenworthy would continue to own and operate KWRC until December 23, 1958, when the station was sold to WSC Broadcasting Company of Oregon, Inc.

=== The KKID years ===
The new owners had the station's call letters changed to KKID in 1959 and by early 1961 had been authorized by the Federal Communications Commission (FCC) to increase its daytime signal strength to 1,000 watts while nighttime power remained at 250 watts. On July 15, 1961, ownership of KKID passed from WSC Broadcasting Company of Oregon, Inc., to Roderick Sound, Inc.

=== The KTIX era ===
The callsign was changed again in 1964, this time to the current KTIX. Eastern Oregon Broadcasters, Inc., acquired KTIX on August 1, 1967, and flipped the station to a contemporary music format. As a part of the Capps Broadcasting Group, this music format would endure on KTIX through the entire 1970s. The station applied to the FCC to change the name of its licensee to Capps Broadcasting Group, Inc., to reflect the station's true ownership and this change was approved by the FCC on March 28, 1979.

Just after switching back to a country music format in January 1980, Capps Broadcasting Group, Inc., reached an agreement to sell this station to AgPal Broadcasting, Inc. AgPal Broadcasting was owned by Pendleton residents Cheryl and Jim McAnally plus Andy and JoAnn Harle. The deal was approved by the FCC on May 15, 1981.

=== The present ===
In September 1997, AgPal Broadcasting, Inc., reached an agreement to sell this station back to Capps Broadcast Group through its KSRV, Inc., subsidiary. The deal was approved by the FCC on May 14, 1998, and the transaction was consummated on August 27, 1998.

Effective November 1, 2017, Capps Broadcast Group sold KTIX and nine other broadcast properties to Elkhorn Media Group for $1.75 million.

== Former on-air staff ==
- Dave Donahue, a 2000 inductee into the Country Music DJ and Radio Hall of Fame, got his first experience as a disc jockey in a country music format when he joined the KTIX airstaff in 1960.
- Terry Herd, host of the nationally syndicated Into the Blue and a four-time (1998, 2002, 2003, & 2004) winner of Broadcaster of the Year Award from the International Bluegrass Music Association, started his bluegrass radio program in May 1992 on KUMA then KTIX before going national.
