= Thomas McKay (fur trader) =

Anglo-Métis Canadian fur trader (1796–1849)

- Born: c. 1796; Sault Ste. Marie, Upper Canada
- Died: November 1849 – April 1850 (aged 50–52); French Prairie, Oregon
- Resting place: Scappoose, Oregon
- Citizenship: Canadian/American
- Occupations: Fur trader, trapper, explorer, guide
- Spouses: Timmee T'Ikul Tchinouk; She-Who-Rides-Like The Wind Umatilla; Isabelle Montour
- Children: 8, including William Cameron McKay and Donald McKay
- Parent(s): Alexander MacKay, Marguerite Waddens/Wadin
- Relatives: Jean-Étienne Waddens (maternal grandfather)

Thomas McKay (c. 1796–1849) was an Anglo-Métis Canadian fur trader who worked mainly in the Pacific Northwest for the Pacific Fur Company (PFC), the North West Company (NWC), and the Hudson's Bay Company (HBC). He was a fur brigade leader and explorer of the Columbia District and later became a U.S. citizen and an early settler of Oregon.

== Family ==
Thomas was born in 1797 at Sault Ste. Marie, Upper Canada.

His father was the fur trader Alexander MacKay. His mother, from a marriage 'à la façon du pays' (in the style of the country), was a Métis woman named Marguerite Wadin, the daughter of a Cree woman and Swiss fur-trader Jean Etienne Wadin.

=== Wives and children ===
Thomas McKay had at least three wives during his life. His first wife was Timmee T'Ikul Tchinouk, a Chinook woman, daughter of Chief Concomly and were married sometime before 1824 in the Oregon Territory. Their children were Joseph McKay, Margaret McKay, William Cameron McKay, John C. McKay, and Alexander McKay II.

McKay's second wife was She-Who-Rides-Like The Wind Umatilla, a Umatilla; they were married around 1834 in the Oregon Territory. Their child, Donald McKay, was born in 1836.

At Fort Vancouver, on December 31, 1838, he married his third wife, Isabelle Montour, daughter of Nicholas Montour, Jr. and Susanne Humpherville. Their children were Maria McKay and Thomas McKay II.

Altogether, McKay had six sons and two daughters.

== Pacific Fur Company ==
In 1811, Thomas McKay accompanied his father on the Tonquin to the mouth of the Columbia River, where the Pacific Fur Company's Fort Astoria was built. Thomas, who was about 15 years old at the time, was at Fort Astoria when his father Alexander McKay was killed in late 1811 at Clayoquot Sound as the Tonquin was destroyed off of Vancouver Island. In 1813 Fort Astoria and all other Pacific Fur Company assets were sold to the North West Company. Thomas McKay, like a number of other Astorians, joined the NWC at that time.

== North West Company ==
Thomas McKay joined the North West Company after the failure of the Pacific Fur Company in 1813. Between 1815 and 1819 Thomas was in the Red River Colony and fought on the side of the North West Company and the Métis people against the Hudson's Bay Company. McKay fought at the 1816 Battle of Seven Oaks. By 1819 he was back on the Columbia. Within two years the entire North West Company was merged into the Hudson's Bay Company.

== Hudson's Bay Company ==
After the North West Company was merged with the Hudson's Bay Company in 1821 Thomas McKay became an HBC employee, despite having fought the company in the Red River Colony war. In 1824 Chief Factor John McLoughlin was appointed superintendent of the Columbia Department. He and his family moved that year to Fort George (Astoria) and then, once it was built, Fort Vancouver, the new headquarters of the HBC Columbia Department. In 1811 McLoughlin had married Marguerite Wadin, widow of Alexander MacKay and mother of Thomas McKay. Thus in 1824 Thomas's mother and stepfather moved across the continent to the very place Thomas was living.

In the 1820s the HBC sent trading, trapping, and exploring parties south into the Willamette Valley and beyond, eventually reaching California (Mexican Alta California at the time). In 1825 Thomas McKay and Finan McDonald led one of these exploring expeditions south of the Columbia River. He led or accompanied several others.

From 1826 to 1828 McKay took part repeatedly in the Snake Country brigades under Peter Skene Ogden. During this time Ogden explored not only the Snake River basin, but the Deschutes River and Blue Mountains of Oregon, as well as the Klamath Lake region, and the Great Salt Lake and its tributary the Weber River.

In 1828, McKay was in the party sent from Fort Vancouver to retrieve furs and property Indians took from Jedediah Smith on the Umpqua River in southern Oregon.

George Simpson, head of the HBC, had decided to try to over-exploit the Snake Country and create a "fur desert", for the political purpose of keeping American trappers and traders away. McKay, along with other former NWC trappers such as Peter Ogden, Finan McDonald, Francois Payette, and others, "took up Simpson's orders with a fanatical zeal, declaring war on fur-bearing animals south of the Columbia," as historian Richard Mackie put it.

In 1829, Thomas McKay took part in Alexander McLeod's expedition to California. McLeod's party reached as far south as the San Joaquin River and was the first of what became an annual trapping expedition to California, known as the Southern Party. The route from Fort Vancouver to the lower Sacramento River became known as the Siskiyou Trail.

In 1836, McKay led a HBC Southern Party brigade to the Pit River region of California. In 1840-41 McKay and Michel Laframboise were brigade leaders of the Southern Party to California.

In 1832, McKay was given charge of an HBC farm at Scappoose. Within a year he had moved to and settled at Champoeg. He may have retired from the HBC at this time, although he continued to work for the company off and on for many years.

McKay lead a brigade to the Snake Country in 1834, reaching into the far southeast of today's state of Idaho. John Kirk Townsend, who was accompanying an American expedition to establish Fort Hall, described Thomas Mckay's party at the future site of Fort Hall in 1834 as consisting of 17 French Canadians and "half-breeds", and 13 Indians (Nez Perce, Chinook, and Cayuse). Townsend also noted that McKay enforced the HBC policies brigade order, decorum, and strict subordination, as well as the prohibition of trading whiskey to the Indians. All these things, Townsend noted, were in stark contrast to the behavior of American fur traders in the region. Fort Hall was part of an effort by Nathaniel Jarvis Wyeth to break into the Columbia region and compete with the HBC. Politically the entire Oregon Country was free and open to British and American ventures, but the HBC was able to maintain its dominance in the region through various barriers to entry tactics such as dumping and predatory pricing. Wyeth's attempt to compete in the early 1830s was quickly made untenable by the HBC. In the case of Fort Hall, Thomas McKay built the rival post of Fort Boise, which supported an increased HBC effort to turn the Snake Country into a "fur desert" and drive the Americans out. The strategy worked and by 1837 Wyeth had abandoned the region and sold his company's assets, including Fort Hall, to the Hudson's Bay Company.

In 1834, McKay met the American missionary Jason Lee at Fort Hall. McKay guided Lee from Fort Hall to Fort Vancouver, then helped Lee select the site of Willamette Mission.

Thomas McKay remained active in the Snake Country until 1838. He spent most of 1839 at Champoeg.

== Later life ==
Thomas McKay spent most of his later years between his farms at Champoeg and Scappoose. At some point he became a United States citizen.

In 1840, he drove more than 3,600 sheep and 661 cattle from California to Fort Nisqually for the HBC.

In 1841, members of the overland party of the Wilkes Expedition met and breakfasted with McKay at his Champoeg farm. George Colvocoresses of the expedition wrote about McKay, saying that he is "one of the most noted individuals in this part of the country. Among the trappers, he is the hero of many a tale."

McKay raised and led a company of militia which saw active service during the Cayuse War of 1848.

In September 1848, he guided a train of 50 wagons to California.

He died sometime between November 1849 and April 1850, and is buried in an unmarked grave in Scappoose.

== Bibliography ==
- Bird, A. L. (1939). "Thomas McKay". Oregon Historical Quarterly. 40 (1). Oregon Historical Society: 1–14. ISSN 0030-4727. JSTOR 20611164.
- McKay, Thomas, University of Victoria, B.C., Canada
- Thomas McKay (PDF)
