= Roy Schuening =

American football player (born 1984)

No. 67
- Position: Guard

Personal information
- Born: April 8, 1984 (age 42); Pendleton, Oregon, U.S.
- Listed height: 6 ft 3 in (1.91 m)
- Listed weight: 315 lb (143 kg)

Career information
- High school: Pendleton
- College: Oregon State
- NFL draft: 2008: 5th round, 157th overall pick

Career history
- St. Louis Rams (2008); Oakland Raiders (2009); Detroit Lions (2009); Oakland Raiders (2011)

Awards and highlights
- First-team All-Pac-10 (2007)

Career NFL statistics
- Games played: 1
- Games started: 0
- Stats at Pro Football Reference

Roy Schuening (born April 8, 1984) is an American former professional football player who was a guard in the National Football League (NFL). He was selected by the St. Louis Rams in the fifth round of the 2008 NFL draft. He played college football for the Oregon State Beavers.

== Early life ==
Schuening was born and raised in Pendleton, Oregon. He attended Pendleton High School where he excelled in three sports. On the football field, Schuening was a three-year starter on offense and defense from 2000 to 2002. He was named First-team All-Intermountain Conference as a junior and senior and was the league's Lineman of the Year in 2002. Schuening was also named Second-team all-state on defense and honorable mention on offense his senior year. For his achievements his senior season, Schuening was named to the 2003 Les Schwab Oregon Bowl (state high school all-star game).

== College career ==
Schuening chose to play football and receive his education from Oregon State University. After redshirting his first season at OSU, Schuening was named a starter in his second season as a redshirt freshman. He started all 12 games that season and was named to the Sporting News All-Freshman team. In 2005, he started all 11 games and was named honorable mention All-Pac-10.

In his junior season, Schuening was again named honorable mention All-Pac-10. He was the lead blocker in the winning extra point try in the 2006 Sun Bowl to help get running back Yvenson Bernard into the end zone for a two-point conversion to win the game.

During the 2007 season, Schuening moved from the right offensive guard to tackle, due to some injuries on the team. He was named first-team All-Pac-10 for his achievements during his senior year. On December 28, 2007, in the Emerald Bowl against the University of Maryland, he set an Oregon State football record by starting his 50th consecutive game. In that game, he figured in several key blocks to lead the Beavers to a 21–14 victory over the Terrapins.

== Professional career ==
=== Pre-draft ===
Schuening was considered one of the top NCAA offensive guards in the nation by many sources.

Pre-draft measurables
Height	Weight	40-yard dash	10-yard split	20-yard split	20-yard shuttle	Three-cone drill	Vertical jump	Bench press
6 ft 3 5/8 in (1.92 m)	306 lb (139 kg)	5.30 s	1.79 s	3.04 s	4.54 s	7.57 s	25 in (0.64 m)	26 reps
Shuttle and cone drill from Pro Day, all other values from NFL Combine.

Schuening was mentioned in several articles and on several blogs as a potential first-day pick for the 2008 NFL Draft. During ESPN's All-American team announcement, they stated that "In a year where few guards have grabbed the attention of NFL scouts; Schuening has grabbed it week after week after week."

=== St. Louis Rams ===
Schuening was selected by the St. Louis Rams in the fifth round of the 2008 NFL draft with the 157th overall pick. On July 13, 2008, he agreed to terms with the Rams on a three-year $1.283 million that includes a signing bonus of $128,000. He was waived during final cuts on September 5, 2009.

=== Oakland Raiders ===
Schuening was signed to the practice squad of the Oakland Raiders on September 7, 2009. He was promoted to the active roster on December 13, but waived on December 15 when the team signed quarterback J. P. Losman.

=== Detroit Lions ===
Schuening was signed by the Lions in early 2010. He had worked with the Lions starting unit in OTAs but an arm injury took him out of the lineup. Detroit released Schuening on August 20, 2010.

Scheuning never started an NFL game and has one appearance in an NFL game to his credit.
