= William Cameron McKay =

Physician and military guide from Oregon

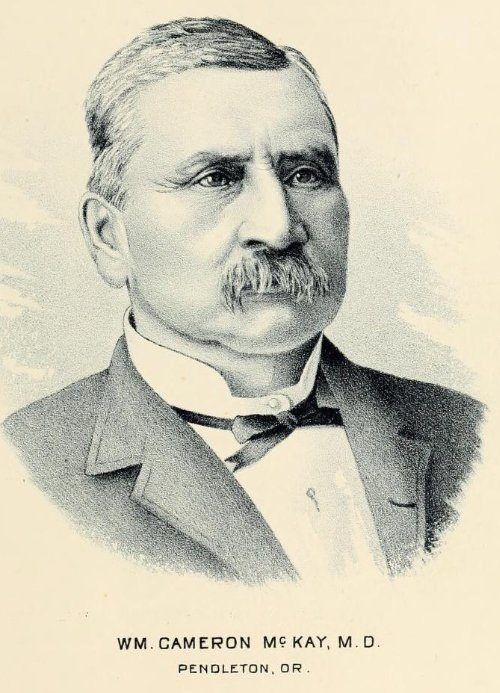
- Allegiance: United States
- Branch: U.S. Army
- Conflicts: Snake War; Modoc War

William Cameron McKay (1824–1893) was a scout in the Snake War and Modoc War, a Captain in the U.S. Army, a member of the Warm Springs Scouts, and a physician and surgeon.

William Cameron McKay was born in the Oregon Country, at Fort George, on May 18, 1824, what is now Astoria, Oregon. He was the son of a famous trapper and guide Thomas McKay and his wife, Timmee T'lkul Tchinouk, daughter of Tshinouk (Chinook) chief Concomly. He was a grandson of Alexander MacKay and the step-grandson of Dr. John McLoughlin.

Educated by his step-grandfather, he was sent with his brothers to be educated in the Eastern United States in 1838. He trained at Fairfield Medical College in Fairfield, New York. At the age of 19 he was licensed to practice medicine. He received an honorary medical diploma from Willamette University College of Medicine in 1873.

In 1871, Dr. McKay began a lawsuit to establish his American citizenship. In his ruling, Judge Matthew Deady wrote that McKay did not become a US citizen under the 14th Amendment's citizenship clause, because at birth, he had not been under the sole jurisdiction of United States, as the Oregon Country was then jointly held with Great Britain. In response the following year, Oregon Senator Henry Corbett introduced legislation, ultimately successful, to reverse the debility that Deady had imposed. This was the first birthright citizenship legislation in the United States after the passage of the 14th Amendment.

He commanded a group of Warm Springs Indians that served as scouts for the U.S. Army in the Snake War, a campaign against the Northern Paiute in 1866–1868.

He was appointed on several occasions to serve as doctor at both the Warm Springs and Umatilla reservations.

He died in 1893, aged 74, in Pendleton, Oregon.
