= Environmental model city =

An Environmental model city (環境モデル都市, Kankyō moderu toshi) is a municipality designated by the Japanese government to be a model for making large cuts in greenhouse gas emissions towards the realization of a low-carbon society.

== Current environmental model cities ==
- Obihiro, Hokkaido
- Shimokawa, Hokkaido
- Yokohama, Kanagawa Prefecture
- Toyama, Toyama Prefecture
- Kitakyushu, Fukuoka Prefecture
- Minamata, Kumamoto Prefecture

The above municipalities were designated on July 22, 2008.

- Chiyoda, Tokyo Prefecture
- Iida, Nagano Prefecture
- Toyota, Aichi Prefecture
- Kyoto, Kyoto Prefecture
- Sakai, Osaka Prefecture
- Yusuhara, Kōchi Prefecture
- Miyakojima, Okinawa Prefecture

The above municipalities were designated on January 22, 2009.
