= KWHT =

Radio station in Pendleton, Oregon

- Pendleton, Oregon; United States
- Broadcast area: Walla Walla, Washington
- Frequency: 103.5 MHz
- Branding: 103.5 K-WHEAT

Programming
- Format: Country

Ownership
- Owner: Elkhorn Media Group; (EMG2, LLC)
- Sister stations: KCMB, KTEL, KTIX, KUMA, KUMA-FM, KWRL, KWVN-FM

History
- First air date: 1984
- Former call signs: KFMT (1980–1984, CP)
- Call sign meaning: K WHeaT

Technical information
- Licensing authority: FCC
- Facility ID: 644
- Class: C1
- ERP: 100,000 watts
- HAAT: 219 meters (719 feet)
- Transmitter coordinates: 45°48′02″N 118°22′36″W

Links
- Public license information: Public file; LMS
- Webcast: Listen Live
- Website: www.mycolumbiabasin.com/about-us/

KWHT (103.5 FM, "K-Wheat") is a radio station licensed to serve Pendleton, Oregon, United States. The station, which began broadcasting in 1984, is currently owned by Randolph and Debra McKone's Elkhorn Media Group and the broadcast license is held by EMG2, LLC.

== Programming ==
KWHT broadcasts a country music format to the greater Walla Walla, Washington, area. This includes select programming from the Westwood One Radio Network. Syndicated music programming includes America's Grand Ole Opry Weekend from Westwood One.

== Facilities ==
KWHT shares a studio building with sister stations KTIX (1240 AM), KUMA (1290 AM), and KWHT (103.5 FM). This multi-station facility is located at the west end of Eastern Oregon Regional Airport.

== History ==
This station received its original construction permit from the Federal Communications Commission (FCC) on May 15, 1980. The new station was assigned the call letters KFMT by the FCC.

In September 1983, Faith Media, Inc., announced an agreement to sell this permit for this still-under construction station to AgPal Broadcasting, Inc. The deal was approved by the FCC on December 1, 1983, and the transaction was consummated on February 7, 1984. AgPal Broadcasting was owned by Pendleton couples Andy and JoAnn Harle plus Cheryl and Jim McAnally.

Under new ownership, the station was assigned the current KWHT call letters by the FCC on February 3, 1984. After several extensions, KWHT finally received its license to cover from the FCC on October 17, 1984.

In September 1997, AgPal Broadcasting, Inc., reached an agreement to sell KWHT and its sister stations to Capps Broadcast Group through its KSRV, Inc., subsidiary. The deal was approved by the FCC on May 14, 1998, and the transaction was consummated on August 27, 1998.

Effective November 1, 2017, Capps Broadcast Group sold KWHT and nine other broadcast properties to Elkhorn Media Group for $1.75 million.

== Former on-air staff ==
- Paul Bonnell, known on the air as Kaptain Kevin Cook, worked as a disc jockey at KWHT in the 1990s after serving in the United States Air Force. Bonnell co-hosted a morning show at a radio station in Sacramento, California, until his death in 2007.
- Ron Arp, now the general manager of the Portland, Oregon office of a public relations company known as Fleishman-Hillard, was a news broadcaster at KWHT in the mid-1980s. Fleishman-Hilliard is a part of the Omnicom Group.
- Jeff Walker, then Program Director at KWHT, was also co-host of the morning show and helped manage the station during the mid to late 80s into the early 90s.
