= Kyme =

Kyme may refer to:

- Any of several ancient Greek cities (Greek Κύμη, also spelled Kymē, Cyme, Cuma or Cumae):
  - Kyme (Italy) (Cumae, an ancient Greek colony near Naples)
  - Kyme (Aeolis)
  - Kyme (Euboea) (modern Kymi)
- Kyme Priory, a priory in South Kyme, Lincolnshire
- Kyme Castle, a medieval estate, in Newton Kyme, Yorkshire
- Kyme (actress), an American TV actor
- John Kyme (disambiguation)
