= Yusuhara =

Yusuhara 梼原町
- Town
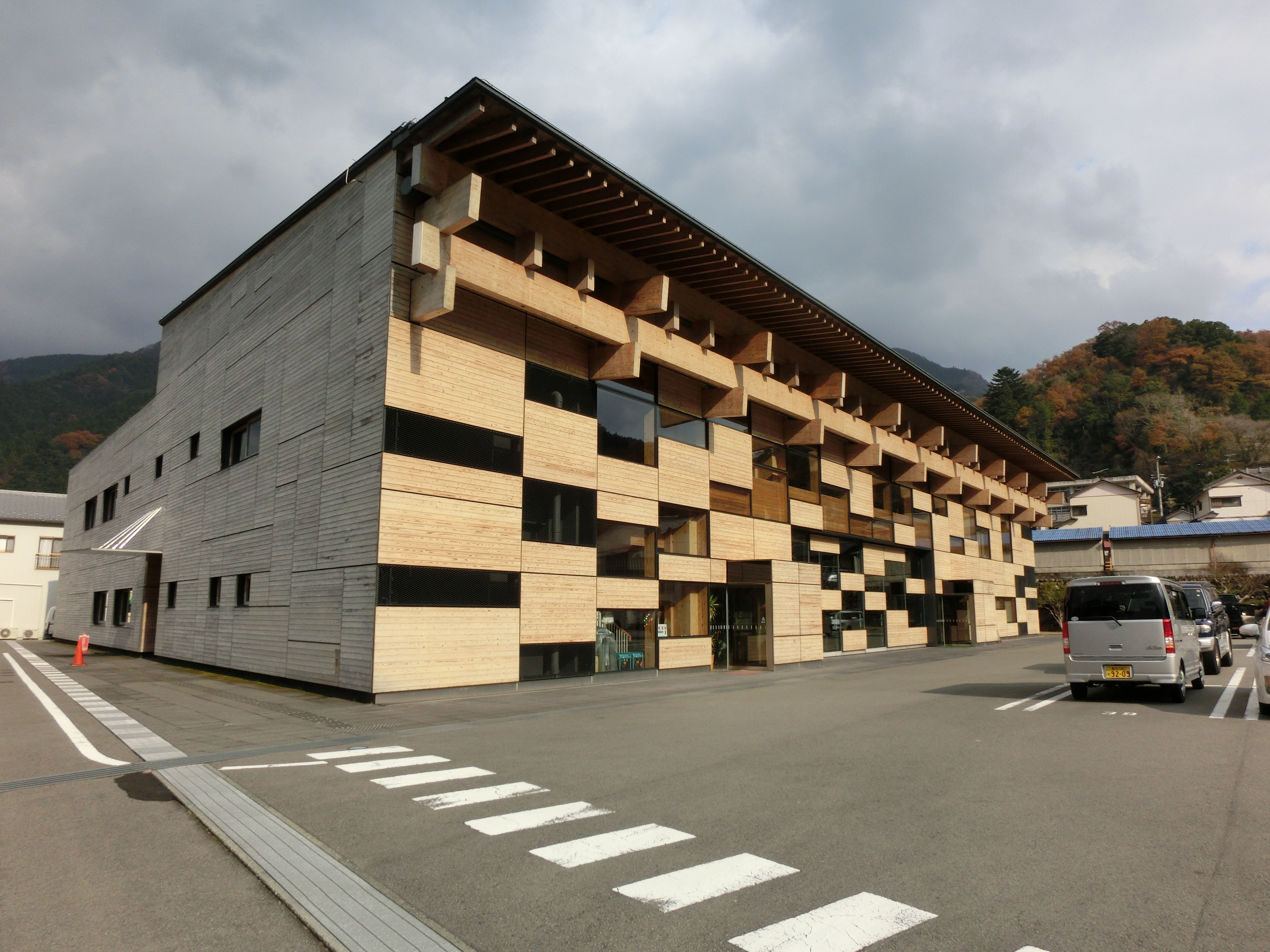
- Yusuhara town office

- Flag Chapter
- Location of Yusuhara in Kōchi Prefecture

- Location in Japan
- Coordinates: 33°24′N 132°56′E
- Country: Japan
- Region: Shikoku
- Prefecture: Kōchi
- District: Takaoka

Government
  - Mayor: Tomio Yano

Area
  - Total: 236.45 km^{2} (91.29 sq mi)

Population (July 31, 2022)
  - Total: 3,285
  - Density: 13.89/km^{2} (35.98/sq mi)
- Time zone: UTC+09:00 (JST)
- City hall address: 1444-1 Yusuhara, Yusuhara-chō, Takaoka-gun, Kōchi-ken 785-0695
- Climate: Cfa
- Website: Official website
- Symbols
- Bird: Varied tit (Cyanistes varius)
- Flower: Mountain cherry blossom (Prunus jamasakura)

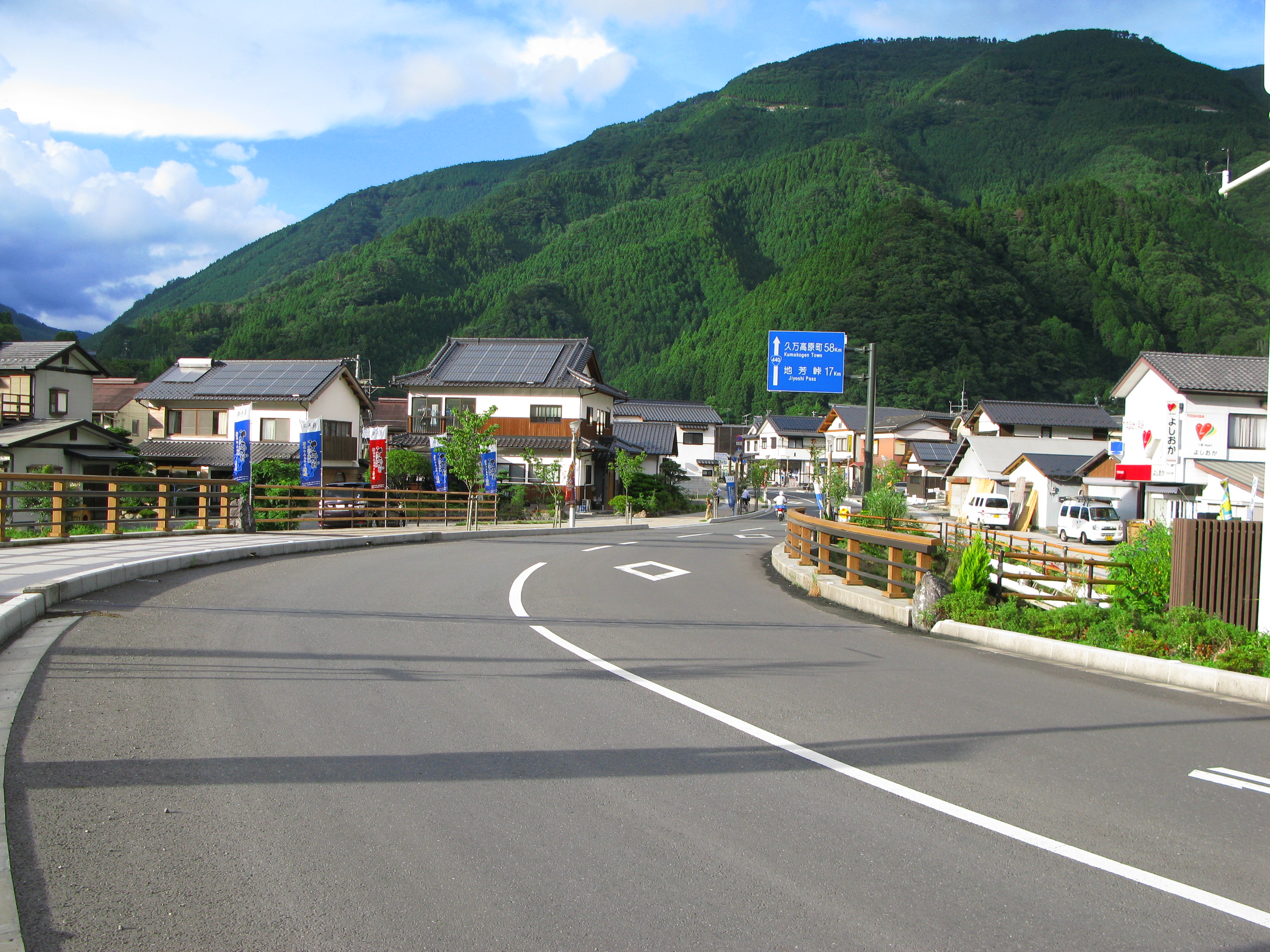
Japan National Route 440 in Yusuhara

Yusuhara (檮原町, Yusuhara-chō) is a town located in Takaoka District, Kōchi Prefecture, Japan. As of 31 July 2022, the town had an estimated population of 3,285 and a population density of 14 persons per km². The total area of the town is 236.45 square kilometres (91.29 sq mi).

== Geography ==
Yusuhara is located in the northwestern part of Kōchi Prefecture, on the island of Shikoku, at the western end of the Shikoku Mountains. Surrounded by mountains on all sides, forests cover 91% of the town's area.

=== Neighbouring municipalities ===
Ehime Prefecture

- Kihoku
- Kumakōgen
- Seiyo

Kōchi Prefecture

- Shimanto
- Tsuno

=== Climate ===
Yusuhara has a humid subtropical climate (Köppen climate classification Cfa) with hot, humid summers and cool winters. There is significant precipitation throughout the year, especially during June and July. The average annual temperature in Yusuhara is 13.4 °C (56.1 °F). The average annual rainfall is 2,728.7 mm (107.43 in) with July as the wettest month. The temperatures are highest on average in August, at around 24.3 °C (75.7 °F), and lowest in January, at around 2.6 °C (36.7 °F). The highest temperature ever recorded in Yusuhara was 38.7 °C (101.7 °F) on 12 August 2013; the coldest temperature ever recorded was −12.0 °C (10.4 °F) on 1 January 1981.

Climate data for Yusuhara (1991−2020 normals, extremes 1977−present)
Month	Jan	Feb	Mar	Apr	May	Jun	Jul	Aug	Sep	Oct	Nov	Dec	Year
Record high °C (°F)	18.6 (65.5)	23.6 (74.5)	26.1 (79.0)	30.2 (86.4)	32.5 (90.5)	34.5 (94.1)	38.2 (100.8)	38.7 (101.7)	36.0 (96.8)	29.8 (85.6)	26.2 (79.2)	20.8 (69.4)	38.7 (101.7)
Mean daily maximum °C (°F)	7.6 (45.7)	9.3 (48.7)	13.5 (56.3)	19.1 (66.4)	23.3 (73.9)	25.4 (77.7)	29.5 (85.1)	30.3 (86.5)	26.9 (80.4)	21.8 (71.2)	16.0 (60.8)	10.0 (50.0)	19.4 (66.9)
Daily mean °C (°F)	2.6 (36.7)	3.6 (38.5)	7.1 (44.8)	12.1 (53.8)	16.5 (61.7)	20.0 (68.0)	23.8 (74.8)	24.3 (75.7)	21.0 (69.8)	15.4 (59.7)	9.7 (49.5)	4.4 (39.9)	13.4 (56.1)
Mean daily minimum °C (°F)	−1.4 (29.5)	−1.0 (30.2)	1.8 (35.2)	6.2 (43.2)	11.0 (51.8)	15.9 (60.6)	20.1 (68.2)	20.6 (69.1)	17.1 (62.8)	10.9 (51.6)	5.0 (41.0)	0.3 (32.5)	8.9 (48.0)
Record low °C (°F)	−12.0 (10.4)	−10.5 (13.1)	−6.6 (20.1)	−3.0 (26.6)	0.3 (32.5)	6.6 (43.9)	13.2 (55.8)	12.8 (55.0)	5.2 (41.4)	−1.0 (30.2)	−3.7 (25.3)	−11.4 (11.5)	−12.0 (10.4)
Average precipitation mm (inches)	87.3 (3.44)	109.0 (4.29)	164.9 (6.49)	180.5 (7.11)	220.9 (8.70)	353.7 (13.93)	421.9 (16.61)	409.5 (16.12)	390.7 (15.38)	173.9 (6.85)	113.7 (4.48)	102.8 (4.05)	2,728.7 (107.43)
Average precipitation days (≥ 1.0 mm)	11.2	10.4	12.8	11.1	11.2	14.9	13.9	13.1	13.3	9.0	9.1	11.0	141
Mean monthly sunshine hours	112.6	125.9	164.2	186.1	190.8	124.7	160.3	171.1	133.5	141.2	115.9	113.5	1,739.7
Source: Japan Meteorological Agency

== Demographics ==
Per Japanese census data, the population of Yusuhara in 2020 is 3,307 people. Yusuhara has been conducting censuses since 1920.

Historical population
Year	Pop.	±%
1920	8,057	—
1925	7,988	−0.9%
1930	8,727	+9.3%
1935	9,180	+5.2%
1940	9,096	−0.9%
1945	10,292	+13.1%
1950	10,735	+4.3%
1955	10,651	−0.8%
1960	9,850	−7.5%
1965	8,477	−13.9%
1970	7,011	−17.3%
1975	6,170	−12.0%
1980	5,750	−6.8%
1985	5,407	−6.0%
1990	5,020	−7.2%
1995	4,998	−0.4%
2000	4,860	−2.8%
2005	4,625	−4.8%
2010	3,984	−13.9%
2015	3,608	−9.4%
2020	3,307	−8.3%
Yusuhara population statistics

== History ==
As with all of Kōchi Prefecture, the area of Yusuhara was part of ancient Tosa Province. During the Edo period, the area was part of the holdings of Tosa Domain ruled by the Yamauchi clan from their seat at Kōchi Castle. The village of Yusuhara was established with the creation of the modern municipalities system on October 1, 1889. It was raised to town status on November 4, 1966. It was designated as a "Environmental model city" in 2009.

== Government ==
Yusuhara has a mayor-council form of government with a directly elected mayor and a unicameral town council of seven members. Yusuhara, together with the municipalities of Nakatosa, Tsuno and Shimanto, contributes two members to the Kōchi Prefectural Assembly. In terms of national politics, the town is part of Kōchi 2nd district of the lower house of the Diet of Japan.

== Economy ==
The economy of Yusuhara is almost entirely agricultural and forestry. The town produces most of its own electricity via wind power, solar power and small hydroelectric turbines.

== Education ==
Yusuhara has one public combined elementary/middle school operated by the village government, and one public high school operated by the Kōchi Prefectural Board of Education.

== Transportation ==
=== Railway ===
The town does not have any passenger railroad service. The nearest passenger railway station is Susaki Station in Susaki.

=== Highways ===
- National Route 197
- National Route 440
