= KWRL =

- La Grande, Oregon; United States
- Frequency: 102.3 MHz
- Branding: 102.3 The River

Programming
- Format: Hot AC

Ownership
- Owner: Elkhorn Media Group; (KWRL, LLC)
- Sister stations: KCMB, KTEL, KTIX, KUMA, KUMA-FM, KWHT, KWVN-FM

History
- First air date: May 2, 1988 (at 100.1)
- Former frequencies: 100.1 MHz (1988–1996); 99.9 MHz (1996–2017)

Technical information
- Licensing authority: FCC
- Facility ID: 24797
- Class: C1
- ERP: 25,000 watts
- HAAT: 505 meters (1,657 feet)
- Transmitter coordinates: 45°7′21″N 117°46′44″W
- Translator: 99.5 K258BM (La Grande)

Links
- Public license information: Public file; LMS
- Webcast: Listen Live
- Website: myeasternoregon.com

KWRL (102.3 FM, "The River") is a radio station licensed to serve La Grande, in the U.S. state of Oregon. The station is owned by Elkhorn Media Group and the broadcast license is held by KWRL, LLC.

KWRL broadcasts a hot adult contemporary music format.

== History ==
This station received its original construction permit for a new FM station broadcasting with 3,000 watts of effective radiated power on 100.1 MHz from the Federal Communications Commission on May 2, 1988. The new station was assigned the call letters KWRL by the FCC on June 27, 1988. KWRL received its license to cover from the FCC on November 25, 1988.

In January 1996, KWRL received authorization to move to 99.9 MHz and upgrade from a class A to a class C1 station with 60,000 watts of effective radiated power.

In October 1998, original license holder Grande Ronde Broadcasting, Inc., reached an agreement to sell this station to Capps Broadcast Group through their KSRV, Inc., subsidiary. The deal was approved by the FCC on December 14, 1998, and the transaction was consummated on December 18, 1998.

Effective August 28, 2012, KWRL was sold by Capps Broadcast Group to KWRL, LLC for $750,000.

In 2017, KWRL moved from 99.9 MHz to 102.3 MHz with no other changes in power and transmitter location.

== Construction permit ==
The FCC granted KWRL a new construction permit on March 13, 2009, to raise the antenna's height above average terrain to 505 meters (1,657 feet), unify the effective radiated power at 25,000 watts, and move the transmitter southeast to 45°07'21"N, 117°46'44"W. The station was issued a license to cover for the permit on October 13, 2009.
