= John Kyme =

John Kyme may refer to:

- John Kyme (MP for Lewes) (born by 1491, died 1546/53)
- John Kyme (MP for Helston) (died 1585)
- John Kyme (MP for City of London) (born by 1469, died 1527/28)
