= KJDY-FM =

- Canyon City, Oregon; United States
- Broadcast area: John Day, Oregon
- Frequency: 94.5 MHz

Programming
- Format: Country

Ownership
- Owner: Randolph and Debra McKone; (KJDY, LLC)
- Sister stations: KJDY

History
- First air date: 1996
- Former call signs: KAJC (1994–1996)
- Call sign meaning: John DaY

Technical information
- Licensing authority: FCC
- Facility ID: 5907
- Class: C0
- ERP: 45,000 watts
- HAAT: 416 meters (1,365 ft)
- Transmitter coordinates: 44°17′50″N 119°02′09″W

Links
- Public license information: Public file; LMS
- Webcast: http://player.listenlive.co/46411

KJDY-FM (94.5 FM) is a radio station licensed to serve Canyon City, Oregon, United States. The station, which began broadcasting in 1996, is owned by Randolph and Debra McKone, through licensee KJDY, LLC.

== Programming ==
KJDY-FM broadcasts a full-service country music format. Syndicated programming includes After Midnite with Blair Garner hosted by Blair Garner from Premiere Radio Networks.

== History ==
The Blue Mountain Broadcasting Company received the original construction permit for this station from the Federal Communications Commission on September 28, 1994. The new station was assigned the KAJC call sign by the FCC on September 28, 1994. The station was assigned new call sign KJDY-FM by the FCC on May 10, 1996. KJDY-FM received its license to cover from the FCC on September 22, 1999.

Effective October 6, 2015, Blue Mountain Broadcasting sold KJDY-FM, sister station KJDY, and translator K229AX to KJDY, LLC, at a purchase price of $405,000.

== Translators ==
KJDY-FM programming is also carried on a broadcast translator station to extend or improve the coverage area of the station.

| Call sign | Frequency | City of license | FID | ERP (W) | Class | FCC info |
|---|---|---|---|---|---|---|
| K229AX | (93.7 FM) FM | John Day, Oregon | 141813 | 220 | D | LMS |
