= Omogo, Ehime =

Dissolved municipality in Ehime prefecture, Japan

Omogo (面河村, Omogo-mura) was a village located in Kamiukena District, Ehime Prefecture, Japan.

As of 2003, the village had an estimated population of 809 and a density of 5.13 persons per square kilometer. The total area was 157.81 km^{2}.

On August 1, 2004, Omogo, along with the town of Kuma, and the villages of Mikawa and Yanadani (all from Kamiukena District), was merged to create the town of Kumakōgen and no longer exists as an independent municipality.
