= Yanadani, Ehime =

Dissolved municipality in Ehime prefecture, Japan

Yanadani (柳谷村, Yanadani-mura) was a village located in Kamiukena District, Ehime Prefecture, Japan.

As of 2003, the village had an estimated population of 1,214 and a density of 9.59 persons per km^{2}. The total area was 126.55 km^{2}.

On August 1, 2004, Yanadani, along with the town of Kuma, and the villages of Mikawa and Omogo (all from Kamiukena District), was merged to create the town of Kumakōgen and no longer exists as an independent municipality.
