= Donald McKay (scout) =

Frontier scout, actor, and spokesman

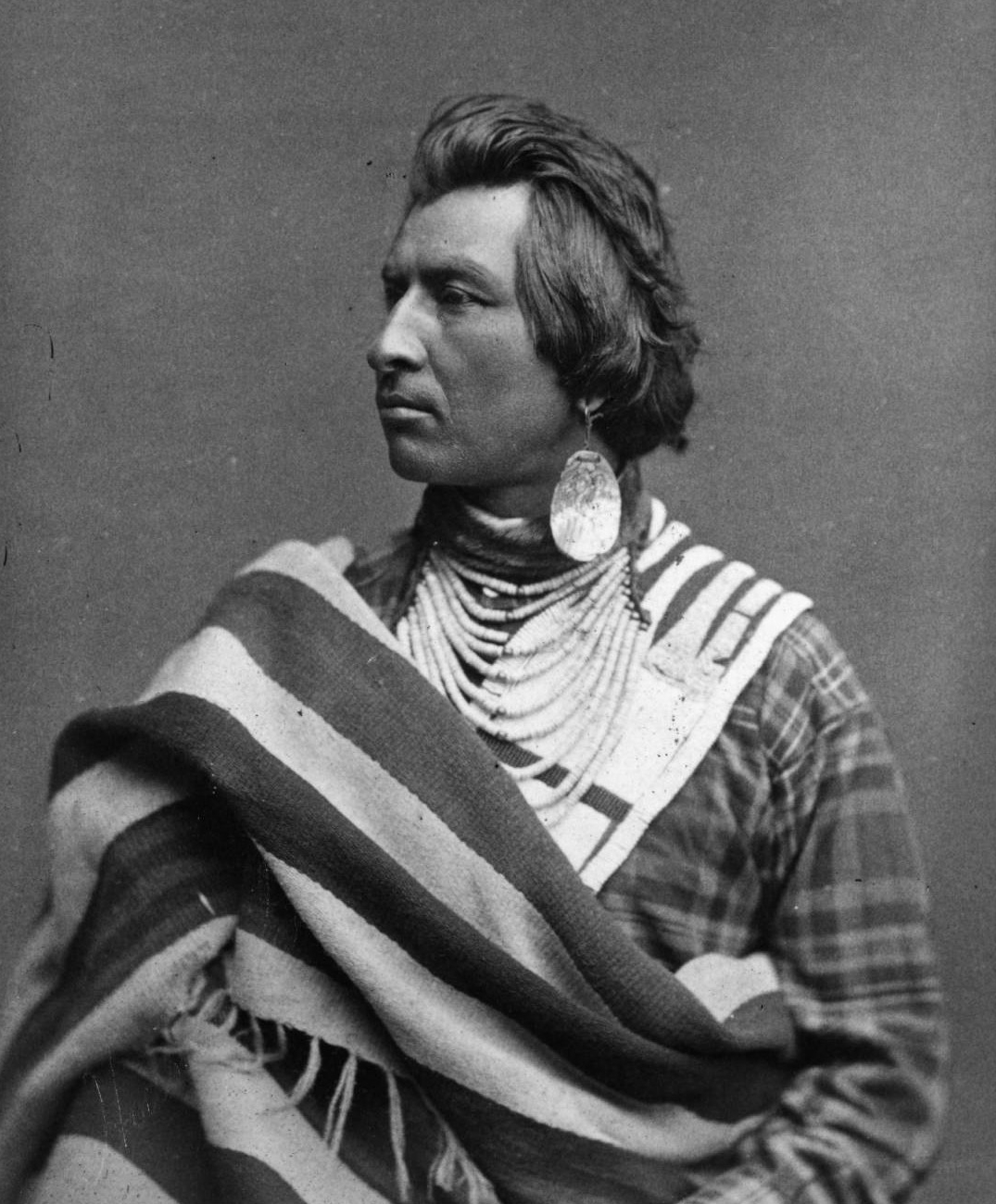
Donald McKay in 1880

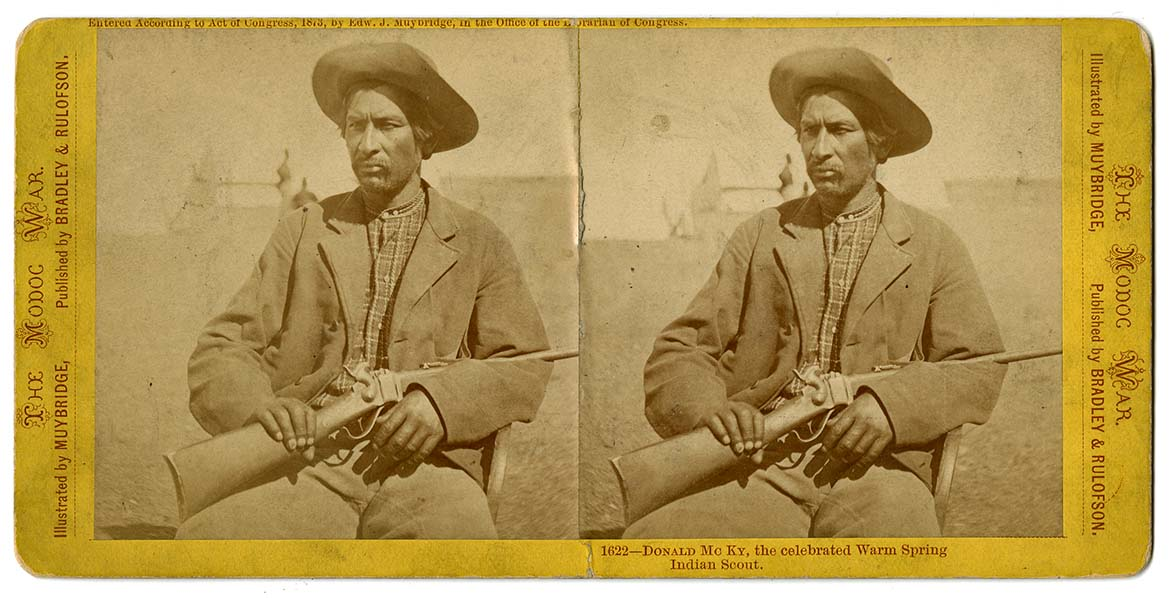
McKay, photographed by Eadweard Muybridge in 1873

Donald McKay (c. 1836 – April 19, 1899) was an American scout, actor, and spokesman. He is best known as the leader of the Warm Springs Indians during the Modoc War and American Indian Wars.

== Biography ==
Donald McKay was born in about 1836 in Oregon Territory to fur trader Thomas McKay and She-Who-Rides-Like-The-Wind Umatilla, a Cayuse woman from the Umatilla tribe.

In 1852, McKay worked as a translator for the Bureau of Indian Affairs and the U.S. Army. In 1872, during the Modoc War, the U.S. Army issued McKay with a temporary commission as captain to lead the Warms Springs Indian Scouts. McKay, met with "Captain Jack" Kintpuash, of the Modoc band, to negotiate an end to the standoff. In the summer of 1873 the war ended with the defeat of the Modoc and the execution of Captain Jack.

Following the Modoc War, McKay toured the country with several Warm Springs Scouts and performed in Wild West shows that were popular at the time. He toured Europe with promoter "Colonel" Thomas Augustus Edwards performing before European monarchs and then returned home to participate in the 1876 American Centennial Exposition celebration in Philadelphia. In 1877, Donald was a part of the 'Texas Jack Combination' formed by Texas Jack Omohundro and debuted in St. Louis that year. Donald toured the U.S. with his family to promote patent medicines with the Kickapoo Indian Medicine Company of Boston and later with the Oregon Indian Medicine Company formed by T.A. Edwards. In 1881 Edwards published a biography of McKay titled Daring Donald McKay; or, The last war-trail of the Modocs.

In 1892, Donald McKay and his family settled on the Umatilla Indian Reservation, where McKay resumed his work as a translator for the Bureau of Indian Affairs. McKay died on April 19, 1899, in Pendleton, Oregon, and is buried at Saint Andrews Mission Cemetery.
