= KUMA-FM =

Radio station in Pilot Rock, Oregon

- Pilot Rock, Oregon; United States
- Broadcast area: Tri-Cities–Walla Walla, Washington
- Frequency: 92.1 MHz
- Branding: 92.1 Party FM

Programming
- Format: Classic hits

Ownership
- Owner: Elkhorn Media Group; (EMG2, LLC)
- Sister stations: KCMB, KTEL, KTIX, KUMA, KWHT, KWRL, KWVN-FM

History
- First air date: July 9, 2006; 19 years ago
- Former call signs: KLTB (2006–2007); KVAN-FM (2007–2010)

Technical information
- Licensing authority: FCC
- Facility ID: 166045
- Class: C3
- ERP: 6,900 watts
- HAAT: 193 meters (633 ft)
- Transmitter coordinates: 45°35′21″N 118°59′54″W

Links
- Public license information: Public file; LMS
- Webcast: Listen live
- Website: elkhornmediagroup.com/columbia-basin/

KUMA-FM (92.1 FM) is a radio station licensed to serve Pilot Rock, Oregon, United States. The station, established in 2006, is owned by Randolph and Debra McKone's Elkhorn Media Group and the broadcast license for this station is held by EMG2, LLC.

== Programming ==
KUMA-FM broadcasts a classic hits music format to the greater Walla Walla, Washington, and Pendleton, Oregon, areas. KUMA-FM is one of several Oregon radio stations serving the larger city across the border in Washington.

The KUMA-FM signal is considered a rimshot and is not currently strong enough in the Tri-Cities, Washington, area to garner any significant ratings. Capps Broadcasting's KWHT is the only station of the group that regularly shows up in the Tri-Cities Arbitron ratings.

== History ==
This station received its original construction permit from the Federal Communications Commission on May 26, 2006. The new station was assigned the call sign KLTB by the FCC on June 26, 2006. The station began broadcasting an oldies music format branded as "Oldies 92.1" under program test authority on July 9, 2006. KLTB received its license to cover from the FCC on September 1, 2006.

License holder Charles R. Nelson reached an agreement in November 2006 to sell this station to general manager Jeffrey Aaron Bruton's Bruton Broadcasting, LLC, in exchange for the assumption of approximately $354,000 in debt and other obligations. Bruton had been operating KLTB under a local marketing agreement since June 16, 2006. The deal was approved by the FCC on January 18, 2007, and the transaction was consummated on January 29, 2007. The new owners applied to the FCC for a new call sign and the station was assigned KVAN-FM on August 7, 2007. The call sign change was part of a rebranding as the station shifted to a classic hits format.

Just over one year after the call sign change, in August 2008, Bruton Broadcasting, LLC, reached an agreement to sell this station back to Charles R. Nelson in exchange for approximately $320,000 in debt relief. The deal was approved by the FCC on October 22, 2008, and the transaction was consummated on October 23, 2008.

In October 2009, Charles R. Nelson reached an agreement to sell KVAN-FM to the Capps Broadcast Group through their UMA, LLC, holding company for a total of $625,000. UMA, LLC, is owned by David N. Capps and Clare Capps of Walla Walla, Washington. The deal was approved by the FCC on November 30, 2009, and the transaction was consummated on December 18, 2009. On January 18, 2010, the new owners had the FCC change the station's call sign to KUMA-FM. On January 27, 2010, KUMA-FM changed its format to adult contemporary, the format that had been aired by the previous KUMA-FM at 107.7 FM.

On March 1, 2015, KUMA-FM changed its format to classic hits, branded as "92.1 Party FM".

Effective November 1, 2017, Capps Broadcast Group sold KUMA-FM and nine other broadcast properties to Elkhorn Media Group for $1.75 million.
