= KCMB =

- Baker City, Oregon; United States
- Frequency: 104.7 MHz
- Branding: 104.7 KCMB

Programming
- Format: Country

Ownership
- Owner: Elkhorn Media Group; (KCMB, LLC)
- Sister stations: KTEL, KTIX, KUMA, KUMA-FM, KWHT, KWRL, KWVN-FM

History
- First air date: June 29, 1988

Technical information
- Licensing authority: FCC
- Facility ID: 50635
- Class: C
- ERP: 100,000 watts
- HAAT: 532 meters (1,745 ft)
- Transmitter coordinates: 45°07′26″N 117°46′48″W
- Translator: 93.7 K229BN (La Grande)

Links
- Public license information: Public file; LMS
- Webcast: Listen live
- Website: elkhornmediagroup.com/kcmb-fm

KCMB (104.7 FM) is a radio station licensed to Baker City, Oregon, United States. The station is owned by the Elkhorn Media Group and the broadcast license is held by KCMB, LLC. KCMB broadcasts a country music format.

== History ==
This station received its original construction permit from the Federal Communications Commission on April 28, 1986. The new station was assigned the KCMB call sign by the FCC on October 3, 1986. KCMB expected to broadcast for the first time on June 27, 1988, but a person shot a transmitter line near the antenna and was postponed to June 29. After multiple extensions, KCMB received its license to cover from the FCC on January 10, 1989.

In December 1989, Clare Marie Ferguson-Capps reached an agreement to transfer the license for this station to Oregon Trail Radio, Inc. The deal was approved by the FCC on February 1, 1990.

Effective August 28, 2012, Capps sold the station to KCMB, LLC for $1.25 million.
