= Cuma, Azerbaijan =

Cuma
- Municipality
- Location within Azerbaijan Location within Shaki-Zagatala Economic Region
- Coordinates: 41°12′33″N 46°57′14″E
- Country: Azerbaijan
- Rayon: Shaki

Population
  - Total: 1,984
- Time zone: UTC+4 (AZT)
  - Summer (DST): UTC+5 (AZT)

Cuma (also, Cumakənd and Cumay) is a village and municipality in the Shaki Rayon of Azerbaijan. It has a population of 1,984.
