= KUMA (AM) =

Radio station in Pendleton, Oregon

- Pendleton, Oregon; United States
- Frequency: 1290 kHz
- Branding: News/Talk 1290

Programming
- Format: News/talk
- Affiliations: Westwood One, Premiere Radio Networks

Ownership
- Owner: Elkhorn Media Group; (EMG2, LLC)
- Sister stations: KCMB, KTEL, KTIX, KUMA-FM, KWHT, KWRL, KWVN-FM

History
- First air date: August 25, 1955 (at 1370)
- Former frequencies: 1370 kHz (1955–1956)
- Call sign meaning: Umatilla County

Technical information
- Licensing authority: FCC
- Facility ID: 57756
- Class: B
- Power: 5,000 watts
- Transmitter coordinates: 45°40′25″N 118°44′48″W
- Translator: 96.5 K243CK (Pendleton)

Links
- Public license information: Public file; LMS
- Webcast: Listen Live
- Website: https://elkhornmediagroup.com/columbia-basin/

KUMA (1290 AM, "News/Talk 1290") is a radio station licensed to serve Pendleton, Oregon, United States. The station is owned by Randolph and Debra McKone's Elkhorn Media Group and the broadcast license is held by EMG2, LLC.

== Programming ==
KUMA broadcasts a news/talk radio format which features programming from Westwood One and Premiere Radio Networks. Local weekday programming includes The Morning Edition with Butch Thurman and Danny Houle plus a 30-minute program called The Coffee Hour.

Syndicated programming includes talk shows hosted by Lars Larson, Dave Ramsey, and Jim Bohannon, plus Coast to Coast AM hosted by George Noory. KUMA also airs The Huckabee Report with former Arkansas governor Mike Huckabee. Weekend programming includes syndicated shows hosted by Kim Kommando and Dr. Dean Edell plus At Home with Gary Sullivan.

== History ==
KUMA began regular broadcasting on August 25, 1955, as a 1,000 watt daytime-only station broadcasting at 1370 kHz. The station, owned and operated by the Pendleton Broadcasting Company, began unlimited 5,000 watt operation at 1290 kHz on January 3, 1956. Pendleton Broadcasting Company was owned by the Fisher family as one of four Oregon radio stations controlled by the Fisher Stations Group.

Pendleton Broadcasting Company, licensee of KUMA, was acquired by Theodore A. "Ted" Smith and his wife Phyllis on November 1, 1966. Ted Smith had joined Pendleton Broadcasting Company in 1955, as general manager of KUMA, after his service in the United States Navy. Ted Smith served as the president of the Oregon Association of Broadcasters in 1962. KUMA was joined by an FM sister station, dubbed KUMA-FM, in 1978. In September 1988, Ted and Phyllis Smith applied to the FCC to transfer control of the Pendleton Broadcasting Company to Gregory A. Smith, their son. The deal was approved by the FCC on November 18, 1988.

In March 1993, Pendleton Broadcasting Company, Inc., reached an agreement to sell this station and AM sister station KUMA to Capps Broadcast Group's Round-Up Radio, Inc. The deal was approved by the FCC on July 1, 1993, and the transaction was consummated on the same day.

KUMA switched to its current all-talk format in October 2002. The station's initial talk lineup included syndicated news and talk programming hosted by Rush Limbaugh, Paul Harvey, Michael Reagan, Laura Ingraham, Jim Bohannon, and Art Bell.

Effective November 1, 2017, Capps Broadcast Group sold KUMA and nine other broadcast properties to Elkhorn Media Group for $1.75 million.

== Facilities ==
KUMA shares a studio building with sister stations KTIX (1240 AM), KWVN-FM (107.7 FM), and KWHT (103.5 FM). This multi-station Capps Broadcast Group facility is located at the west end of Eastern Oregon Regional Airport.
