= Mikawa, Ehime =

Dissolved municipality in Ehime prefecture, Japan

Mikawa (美川村, Mikawa-mura) was a village located in Kamiukena District, Ehime Prefecture, Japan.

As of 2003, the village had an estimated population of 2,232 and a density of 16.61 persons per km^{2}. The total area was 134.38 km^{2}.

On August 1, 2004, Mikawa, along with the town of Kuma, and the villages of Omogo and Yanadani (all from Kamiukena District), was merged to create the town of Kumakōgen and no longer exists as an independent municipality.
