= Kymi =

Kymi may refer to:

== Places ==
- Kymi, Greece
- Kymi, Finland, now part of Kotka
- Kymi (parliamentary electoral district), in Finland
- Kymi Province, a province in Finland 1947–1997
- Kymenlaakso (Kymi Valley), a region of Finland
- Kymijoki (Kymi river), in Finland

== Other uses ==
- Kymi B.C., a basketball club based in Kymi, Greece
- KYMI (FM), an Air1 radio station in Montana, United States
- KJJT, a defunct radio station in Texas, United States, which held call sign KYMI 1990–2007

== See also ==
- Kyme (disambiguation)
- Kyminlinna, a fortress in Finland
- Kymi Ring, a racing circuit in Finland
