= Kumakōgen, Ehime =

Kumakōgen 久万高原町
- Town
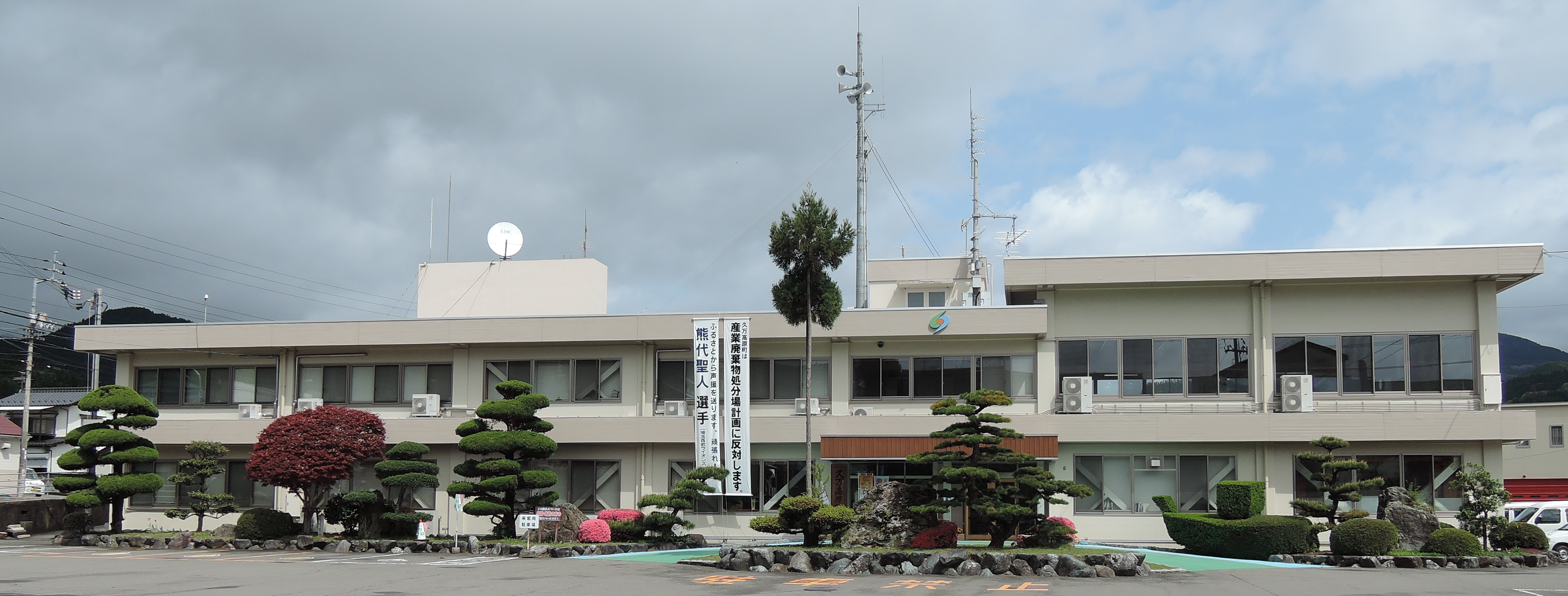
- Kumakogen town hall

- Flag Emblem
- Interactive map of Kumakōgen
- Location in Japan
- Coordinates: 33°39′20″N 132°54′6″E
- Country: Japan
- Region: Shikoku
- Prefecture: Ehime
- District: Kamiukena

Government
  - Mayor: Tadayasu Kono (Incumbent, 2024)

Area
  - Total: 583.69 km^{2} (225.36 sq mi)

Population (August 1, 2023)
  - Total: 6,667
  - Density: 11.42/km^{2} (29.58/sq mi)
- Time zone: UTC+09:00 (JST)
- City hall address: 212 Kuma, Kumakōgen-chō, Kamiukena-gun, Ehime-ken 791-1201
- Website: Official website
- Symbols
- Flower: bamboo lily (ささゆり, Sasayuri)
- Tree: Japanese cedar (杉, Sugi)

Kumakōgen (久万高原町, Kumakōgen-chō) is a town in Kamiukena District, Ehime Prefecture, Japan. As of 1 August 2023, the town had an estimated population of 6,667 and a population density of about 11.4 persons per km^{2}. The total area of the town is 583.69 square kilometres (225.36 sq mi).

== Geography ==
Kumakōgen is located in south-central Ehime Prefecture, on the north side of the Shikoku Mountains, along upper reaches of the Niyodo River. It consists of many hamlets are scattered along river valleys mostly covered with forests. Mount Ishizuchi, the tallest mountain in Shikoku at 1982 meters is located on the border between Seiyo to the northeast. The climate is cool and wet in the summer and winters cold with snow.

=== Neighbouring municipalities ===
Ehime Prefecture

- Matsuyama
- Saijō
- Seiyo
- Tobe
- Tōon
- Uchiko

Kōchi Prefecture

- Ino
- Niyodogawa
- Tsuno
- Yusuhara

=== Climate ===
Kumakōgen has a humid subtropical climate (Köppen Cfa) characterized by warm summers and cool winters with light snowfall. The average annual temperature in Kumakōgen is 13.2 °C. The average annual rainfall is 2014 mm with September as the wettest month. The temperatures are highest on average in August, at around 24.4 °C, and lowest in January, at around 1.9 °C.

Climate data for Kumakōgen, elevation 511m）
Month	Jan	Feb	Mar	Apr	May	Jun	Jul	Aug	Sep	Oct	Nov	Dec	Year
Record high °C (°F)	17.6 (63.7)	20.1 (68.2)	23.8 (74.8)	29.1 (84.4)	31.3 (88.3)	33.5 (92.3)	35.9 (96.6)	36.5 (97.7)	34.6 (94.3)	30.5 (86.9)	24.9 (76.8)	21.6 (70.9)	36.5 (97.7)
Mean daily maximum °C (°F)	6.2 (43.2)	7.7 (45.9)	11.8 (53.2)	17.9 (64.2)	22.4 (72.3)	25.5 (77.9)	29.3 (84.7)	30.0 (86.0)	26.3 (79.3)	20.6 (69.1)	14.8 (58.6)	9.0 (48.2)	18.5 (65.2)
Mean daily minimum °C (°F)	−2.8 (27.0)	−2.3 (27.9)	0.4 (32.7)	5.0 (41.0)	10.2 (50.4)	15.3 (59.5)	19.6 (67.3)	19.8 (67.6)	16.1 (61.0)	9.2 (48.6)	3.7 (38.7)	−1.0 (30.2)	7.8 (46.0)
Record low °C (°F)	−11.3 (11.7)	−13.6 (7.5)	−12.2 (10.0)	−4.7 (23.5)	−0.6 (30.9)	5.3 (41.5)	10.5 (50.9)	12.1 (53.8)	4.2 (39.6)	−1.2 (29.8)	−4.2 (24.4)	−12.4 (9.7)	−13.6 (7.5)
Average precipitation mm (inches)	88.5 (3.48)	96.7 (3.81)	138.7 (5.46)	130.5 (5.14)	175.9 (6.93)	267.7 (10.54)	273.7 (10.78)	202.9 (7.99)	217.5 (8.56)	116.6 (4.59)	98.3 (3.87)	87.9 (3.46)	1,894.9 (74.61)
Average precipitation days (≥ 1.0 mm)	12.8	11.6	14.1	11.1	10.7	13.7	12.5	10.9	11.3	8.9	9.6	11.9	139.1
Mean monthly sunshine hours	93.1	111.0	142.5	170.8	176.7	130.7	163.8	170.0	133.0	135.5	109.3	101.7	1,638.1
Source: Japan Meteorological Agency

== Demographics ==
Per Japanese census data, the population of Kumakōgen has decreased drastically since the 1950s and is now less than a third of what it was a century ago.

Historical population
Year	Pop.	±%
1920	26,860	—
1930	27,858	+3.7%
1940	29,160	+4.7%
1950	38,041	+30.5%
1960	32,896	−13.5%
1970	21,432	−34.8%
1980	16,225	−24.3%
1990	13,313	−17.9%
2000	11,887	−10.7%
2010	9,644	−18.9%
2020	7,404	−23.2%

== History ==
The area of Kumakōgen was part of ancient Iyo Province. During the Edo period, the area was divided between the holdings of Matsuyama Domain or Ōzu Domain. The village of Kumachō was established with the creation of the modern municipalities system on December 1, 1889. It was raised to town status on August 20, 1901, and renamed Kuma. On August 1, 2004, Kuma merged with the villages of Mikawa, Omogo and Yanadani, all from Kamiukena District to form the town of Kumakōgen.

== Government ==
Kumakōgen has a mayor-council form of government with a directly elected mayor and a unicameral town council of 13 members. Kumakōgen is lumped together with the city of Matsuyama, with the combined area contributing 16 members to the Ehime Prefectural Assembly.

In terms of national politics, the town is part of Ehime 3rd district of the lower house of the Diet of Japan. Prior to 2022, the town was part of Ehime 4th district.

== Economy ==
The key industry of Kumakōgen is agriculture and forestry. The town was known for its high-quality wood such as Cryptomeria and hinoki cypress grown in harsh natural conditions, and highland vegetables such as tomatoes, green peppers, and rice that take advantage of the cool summer weather. However, due to the influx of foreign lumber and the slump in lumber prices, the forestry industry has been in decline.

== Education ==
Kumakōgen has nine public elementary schools and two public middle schools operated by the town government, and one public high school operated by the Ehime Prefectural Board of Education.

== Transportation ==
=== Railway ===
Kumakōgen has no passenger railway services. The nearest station to the town is Iyo-Tachibana Station on the Iyotetsu Yokogawara Line

=== Highways ===
- National Route 33
- National Route 380
- National Route 440
- National Route 494

== Local attractions ==
- Iwaya-ji, temple 45 in the Shikoku Pilgrimage
- Goraikō Falls, one of the "One Hundred Waterfalls of Japan"
- Kamikuroiwaiwakage Site, Jomon period remains, National Historic Site
- Taihō-ji, temple 44 in the Shikoku Pilgrimage
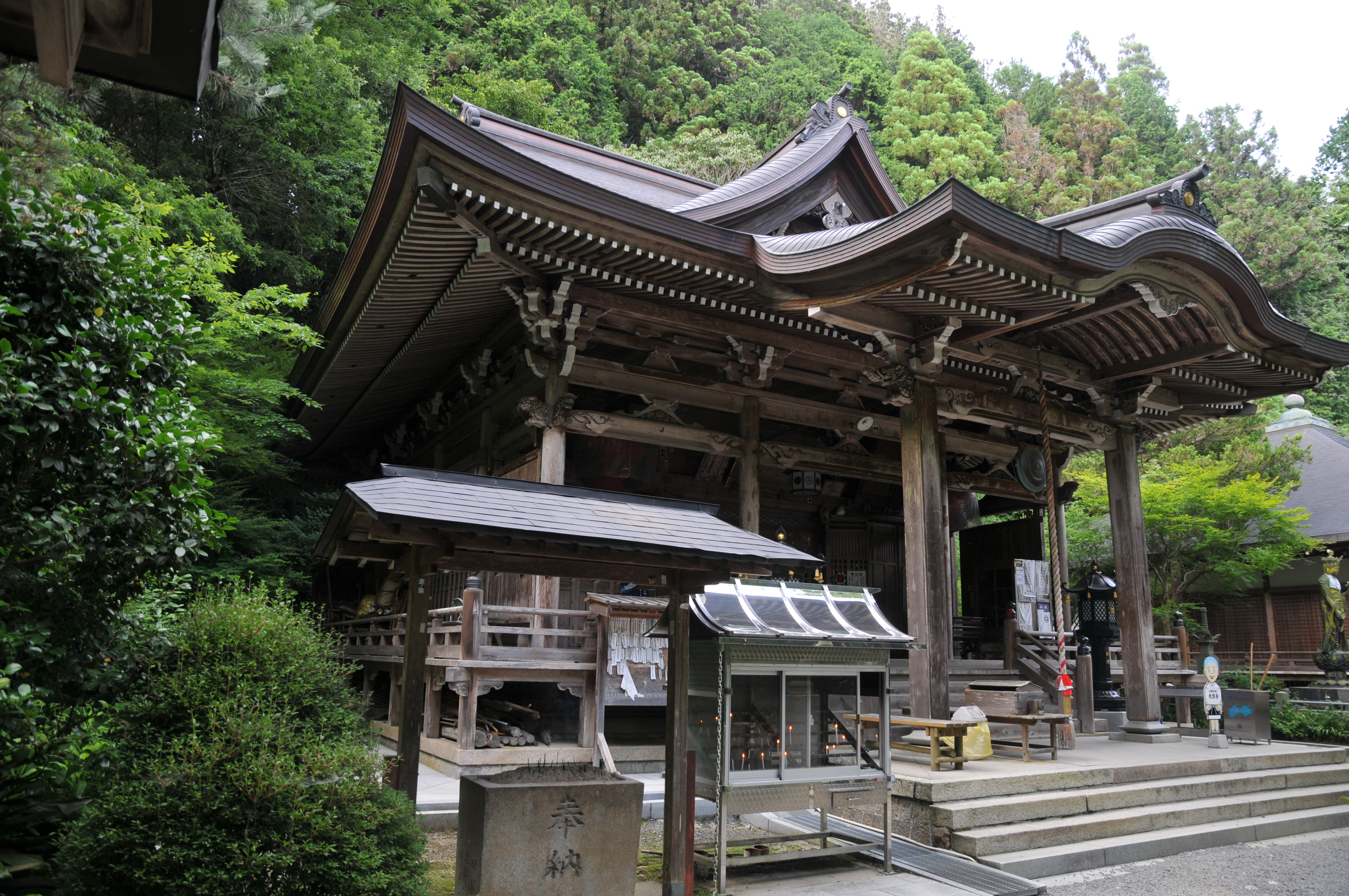
Taihō-ji

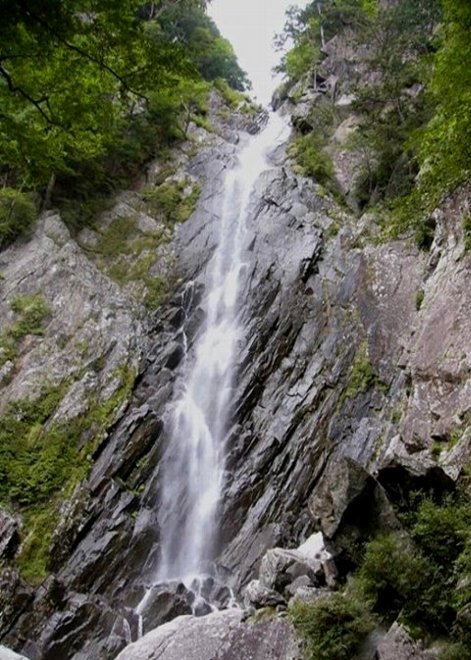
Gōraiko Falls

== Noted people from Kumakōgen ==
- Hiroshi Fujioka, actor, martial artist
