= Čuma =

Serbian legendary creature

Čuma or kuga (Serbian: чума, куга) is the personification of plague in Serbian mythology. It was imagined as an old (rarely, as young) woman dressed in white. Mentioning čuma was avoided, so euphemisms kuma (godmother) or teta (aunty) (Serbian: кума, тета) were used.

Čumas were believed to live in a far away land, from where they set out to infect people. They hate dirtiness and are especially eager to infect a dirty house, hence if plague would appear in the vicinity, it was believed that every house and its occupants must be thoroughly cleaned; which was a useful belief that actually helps with real plague. Offerings of food, clean water, basil and a comb could also be made to her.

== See also ==
- Pestilence
