= Pendleton, Oregon =

- City
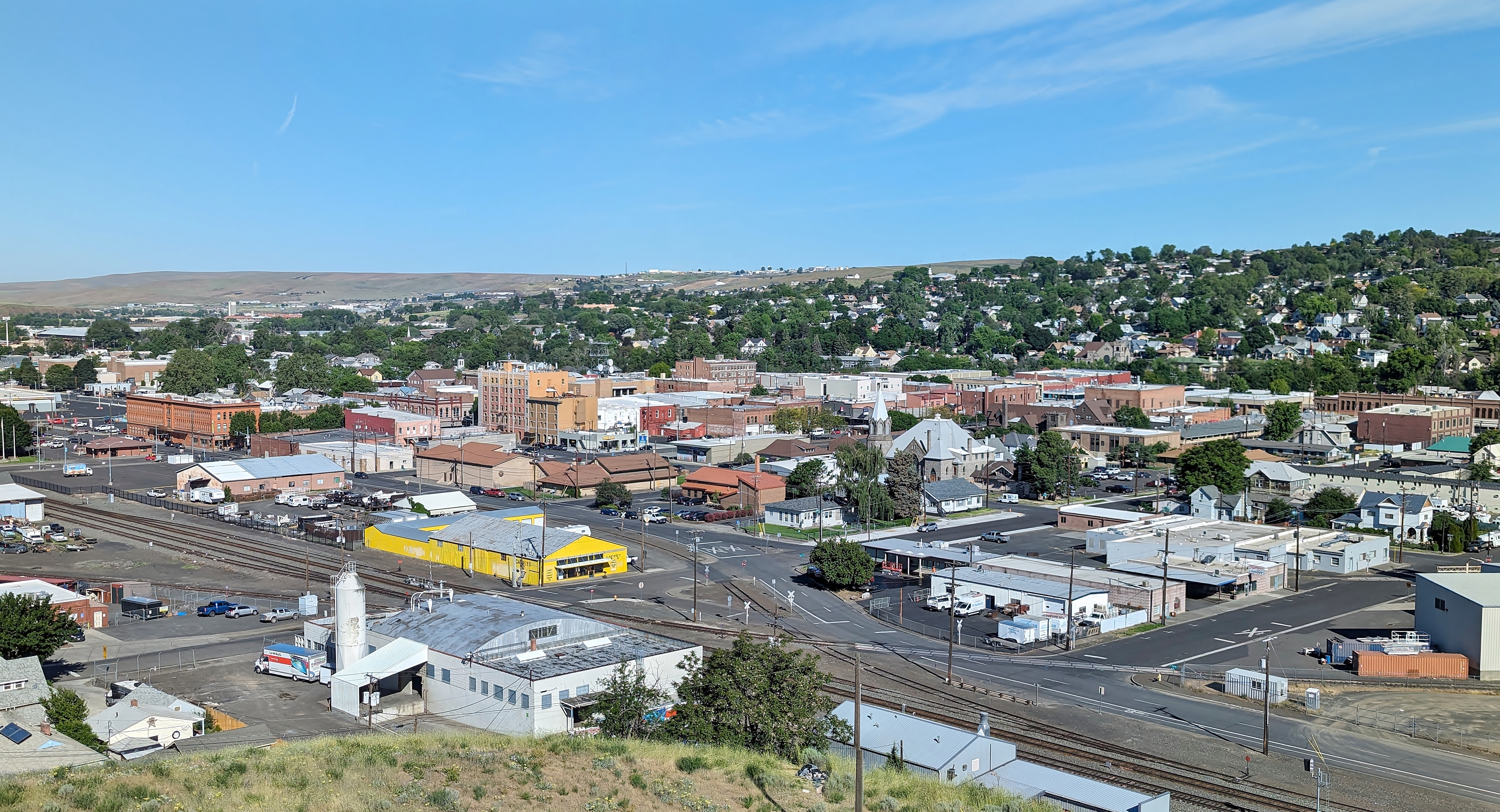
- Downtown Pendleton
- Motto: The Real West
- Location of Pendleton in Umatilla County, Oregon (left) and of Umatilla County in Oregon (right)
- Coordinates: 45°40′32″N 118°49′11″W
- Country: United States
- State: Oregon
- County: Umatilla
- Incorporated: 1880

Government
  - Mayor: McKennon O’Rourke McDonald

Area
  - Total: 11.51 sq mi (29.81 km^{2})
  - Land: 11.51 sq mi (29.81 km^{2})
  - Water: 0 sq mi (0.00 km^{2})
- Elevation: 1,099 ft (335 m)

Population (2020)
  - Total: 17,107
  - Density: 1,486.3/sq mi (573.85/km^{2})
- Time zone: UTC−8 (Pacific)
  - Summer (DST): UTC−7 (Pacific)
- ZIP Code: 97801
- Area codes: 541 and 458
- FIPS code: 41-57150
- GNIS feature ID: 2411399
- Website: www.pendletonor.gov

Pendleton is a city in and the county seat of Umatilla County, Oregon, United States. The population was 17,107 at the time of the 2020 census, which includes approximately 1,600 people who are incarcerated at Eastern Oregon Correctional Institution.

Pendleton is the smaller of the two principal cities of the Hermiston–Pendleton Micropolitan Statistical Area. This micropolitan area covers Morrow and Umatilla counties and had a combined population of 92,261 at the 2020 census.

== History ==
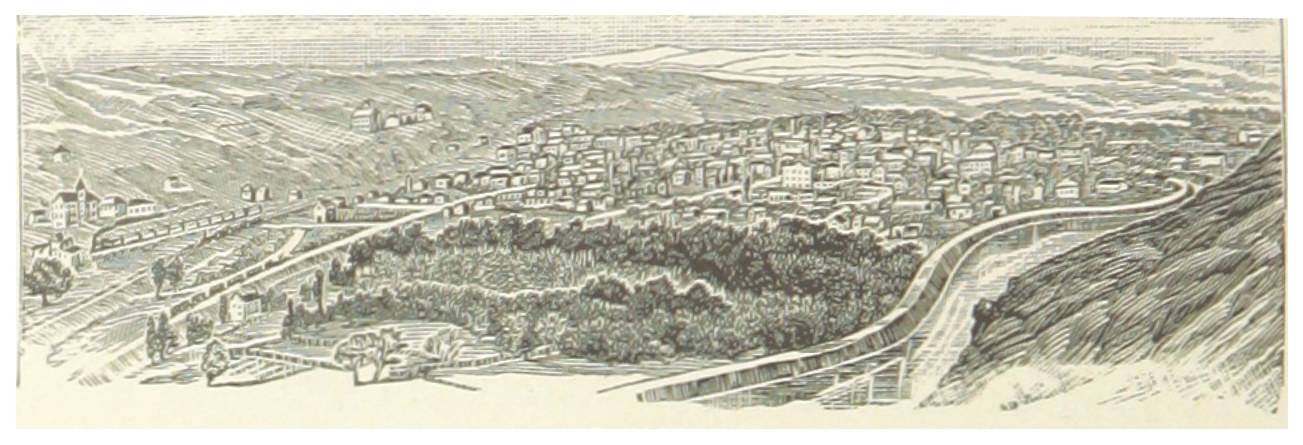
Pendleton in 1891

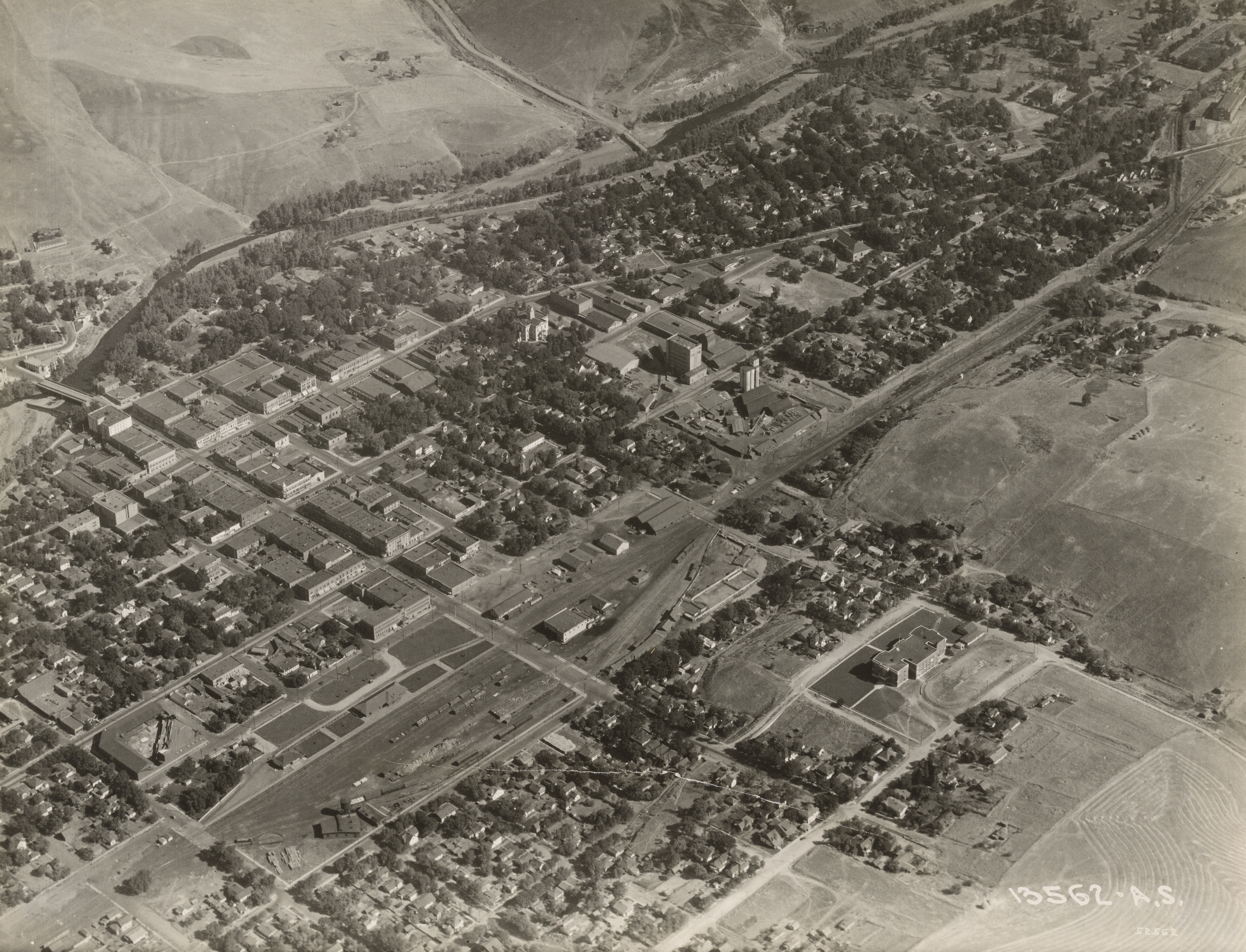
Aerial view of Pendleton in 1923

A group of European explorers led by Wilson Price Hunt were spotted camping near modern-day Pendleton by a band of Native Americans on January 8, 1812.

The present-day site of Pendleton was not developed by European-American settlers until William C. McKay established a trading post at the mouth of McKay Creek. In 1862 Abram Miller filed a claim for a homestead east of McKay's trading post. Soon after, Moses Goodwin traded horses for Abram Miller's plot of land. Goodwin named the plot "Goodwin's Crossing" and established its center on Pendleton's modern-day Main Street. By 1865, Goodwin had built a bridge across the Umatilla River and established a hotel. The first instance of outside investment in the town was from Lot Livermore, who built a store next to Goodwin's hotel. Umatilla County purchased Goodwin's Crossing from Moses Goodwin on December 18th, 1868. The town was renamed Pendleton, after politician and diplomat George H. Pendleton (1825–1889), who served as a U.S. Representative and Senator from Ohio. Pendleton was made the county seat of Umatilla County upon its purchase. The city was incorporated by the Oregon Legislative Assembly on October 25, 1880.

By 1900, Pendleton had a population of 4,406 and was the fourth-largest city in Oregon. The Pendleton Woolen Mills and Pendleton Round Up became features of the city captured in early photographs by Walter S. Bowman. Like many cities in Eastern Oregon, where thousands of Chinese immigrant workers built the transcontinental railroad, it had a flourishing Chinatown that developed as the workers settled here. The sector is supposed to have been underlain by a network of tunnels, which are now a tourist attraction. The authenticity as a Chinese tunnel system has been questioned.

The town is the cultural center of Eastern Oregon. Pendleton's "Old town" is listed as a Historic District on the National Register of Historic Places.

The Confederated Tribes of the Umatilla Indian Reservation (CTUIR) have their property nearby. They have established the Wildhorse Resort & Casino and golf course on the reservation to generate revenue for development and welfare. They have also built the Tamástslikt Cultural Institute, for education and interpretation of their cultures.

== Economy ==
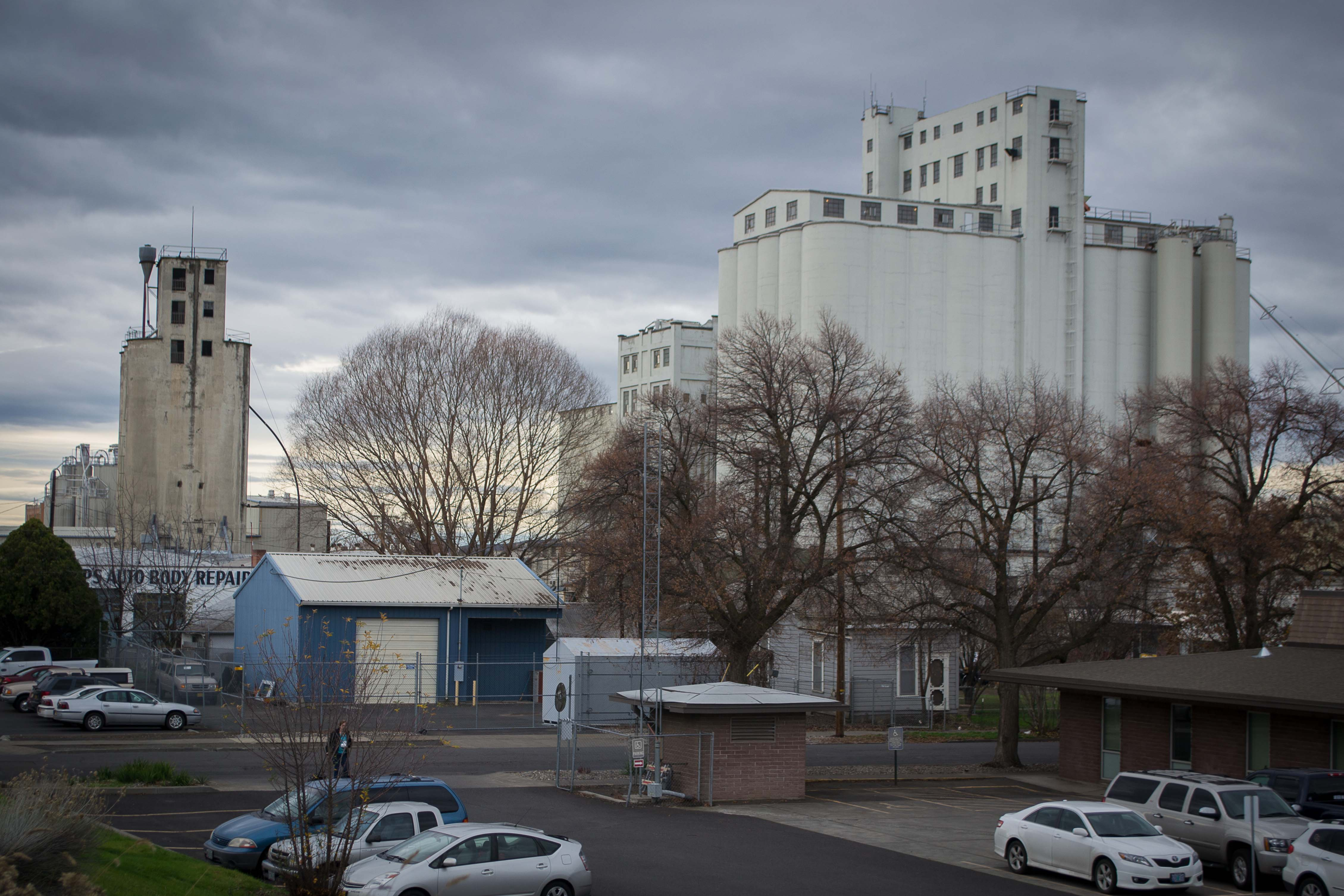
Grain elevators in Pendleton

The Pendleton area's economy has become increasingly reliant on lower-wage hospitality industry jobs, with the growth of Wildhorse Resort & Casino offsetting job losses in other sectors. By 2022 nearly 1 in 5 jobs (18%) in the Pendleton zip code were in "Accommodation & Food Services," up from 13% in 2000. This dynamic resulted in annualized job growth of just 0.47% from 2012 to 2022, and showed the exposure to economic downturns inherent in the tourism industry, with net job losses from 2019 to 2022 as the casino struggled through the COVID-19 pandemic. Residents increasingly commute to the Hermiston area where median incomes are higher, and where 91% of job growth in Umatilla County occurred from 2012 to 2022.

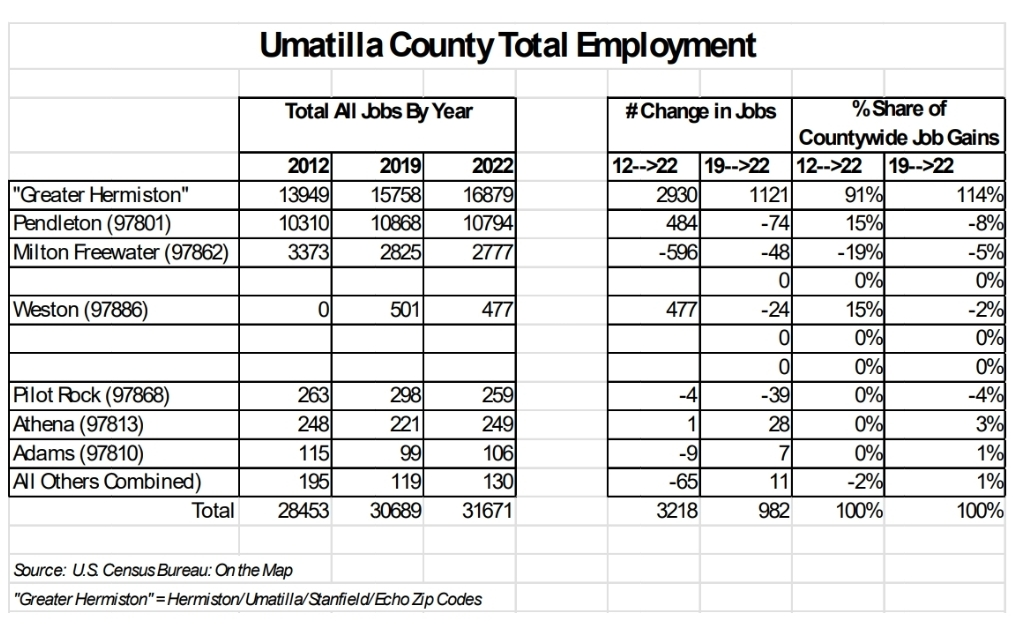
Umatilla County Employment 2012-2022

Pendleton Woolen Mills is a maker of wool blankets, shirts, and an assortment of other woolen goods. Founded in 1909 by Clarence, Roy and Chauncey Bishop, the company built upon earlier businesses related to the many sheep ranches in the region. A wool-scouring plant opened in Pendleton in 1893 to wash raw wool for shipping. In 1895, the scouring mill was converted into a mill that made wool blankets and robes for Native Americans. Both businesses failed to survive, but the Bishops, with the help of a local bond issue, enlarged the mill and improved its efficiency. They developed a successful line of garments and blankets with "vivid colors and intricate patterns."

St. Anthony Hospital in Pendleton is a 25-bed medical center.

Eastern Oregon Correctional Institution (EOCI) in Pendleton is the only place in Oregon where inmates make "Prison Blues" denim clothing. The prison also operates a commercial laundry serving customers that include EOCI, the Snake River Correctional Institution, Pendleton High School, a local flour mill, and other entities. In addition, some EOCI inmates work as clerks or have jobs in food service or maintenance.

== Geography ==
According to the U.S. Census Bureau, the city has a total area of 10.52 square miles (27.25 km^{2}), all land.

The city was built on both sides of the Umatilla River, which has periodically flooded and caused some damage. In the beginning, the river was vital as a transportation and trading route for settlers, as well as a water and power source. It connected the city to the Columbia River.

=== Climate ===
Pendleton has a cool semi-arid climate (Köppen: BSk) with short, cool winters and hot summers. Pendleton had the highest temperature recorded in Oregon at 119 °F or 48.3 °C on August 10, 1898, which was later tied on June 29, 2021, at the Pelton Dam COOP weather station in Jefferson County, and the Moody Farms Agrimet weather station in Wasco County. The highest temperature recorded in Pendleton in recent times was 117 °F or 47.2 °C on that same June 29, 2021.

Climate data for Pendleton, Oregon (Eastern Oregon Regional Airport), 1991–2020 normals, (Note: Mean monthly maxima and minima (i.e. the highest and lowest temperature readings during an entire month or year) calculated based on data at said location from 1991 to 2020.) extremes 1892–present
Month	Jan	Feb	Mar	Apr	May	Jun	Jul	Aug	Sep	Oct	Nov	Dec	Year
Record high °F (°C)	71 (22)	76 (24)	83 (28)	95 (35)	103 (39)	117 (47)	114 (46)	119 (48)	104 (40)	93 (34)	80 (27)	75 (24)	119 (48)
Mean maximum °F (°C)	60.7 (15.9)	61.6 (16.4)	69.4 (20.8)	77.4 (25.2)	88.0 (31.1)	95.2 (35.1)	102.6 (39.2)	101.0 (38.3)	92.6 (33.7)	80.0 (26.7)	66.5 (19.2)	59.9 (15.5)	104.2 (40.1)
Mean daily maximum °F (°C)	41.7 (5.4)	46.4 (8.0)	55.0 (12.8)	61.8 (16.6)	70.9 (21.6)	78.4 (25.8)	89.2 (31.8)	87.6 (30.9)	78.0 (25.6)	63.5 (17.5)	49.1 (9.5)	40.8 (4.9)	63.5 (17.5)
Daily mean °F (°C)	34.9 (1.6)	38.0 (3.3)	44.4 (6.9)	50.1 (10.1)	57.9 (14.4)	64.6 (18.1)	73.0 (22.8)	71.8 (22.1)	63.5 (17.5)	51.5 (10.8)	40.7 (4.8)	34.2 (1.2)	52.1 (11.1)
Mean daily minimum °F (°C)	28.0 (−2.2)	29.6 (−1.3)	33.7 (0.9)	38.3 (3.5)	45.0 (7.2)	50.7 (10.4)	56.7 (13.7)	56.0 (13.3)	49.0 (9.4)	39.4 (4.1)	32.3 (0.2)	27.5 (−2.5)	40.5 (4.7)
Mean minimum °F (°C)	11.7 (−11.3)	15.8 (−9.0)	23.1 (−4.9)	28.5 (−1.9)	33.5 (0.8)	41.2 (5.1)	47.2 (8.4)	46.0 (7.8)	37.8 (3.2)	25.7 (−3.5)	18.8 (−7.3)	12.1 (−11.1)	3.7 (−15.7)
Record low °F (°C)	−26 (−32)	−21 (−29)	1 (−17)	17 (−8)	22 (−6)	30 (−1)	38 (3)	30 (−1)	21 (−6)	11 (−12)	−13 (−25)	−28 (−33)	−28 (−33)
Average precipitation inches (mm)	1.52 (39)	1.19 (30)	1.33 (34)	1.21 (31)	1.45 (37)	1.05 (27)	0.26 (6.6)	0.31 (7.9)	0.53 (13)	1.09 (28)	1.39 (35)	1.50 (38)	12.83 (326.5)
Average snowfall inches (cm)	3.8 (9.7)	4.5 (11)	0.7 (1.8)	0.0 (0.0)	0.0 (0.0)	0.0 (0.0)	0.0 (0.0)	0.0 (0.0)	0.0 (0.0)	0.1 (0.25)	1.2 (3.0)	5.4 (14)	15.7 (39.75)
Average precipitation days (≥ 0.01 in)	12.3	9.9	11.6	9.6	9.6	6.5	2.4	2.2	3.8	8.2	11.6	12.5	100.2
Average snowy days (≥ 0.1 in)	2.9	2.2	1.1	0.0	0.0	0.0	0.0	0.0	0.0	0.1	1.2	3.7	11.2
Source 1: NOAA
Source 2: National Weather Service

== Demographics ==
Historical population
Census	Pop.	Note	%±
1870	243		—
1880	730		200.4%
1890	2,506		243.3%
1900	4,406		75.8%
1910	4,460		1.2%
1920	6,837		53.3%
1930	6,621		−3.2%
1940	8,847		33.6%
1950	11,774		33.1%
1960	14,434		22.6%
1970	13,197		−8.6%
1980	14,521		10.0%
1990	15,126		4.2%
2000	16,354		8.1%
2010	16,612		1.6%
2020	17,107		3.0%

=== 2020 census ===
As of the 2020 census, Pendleton had a population of 17,107 and a median age of 37.8 years. 20.2% of residents were under the age of 18 and 16.5% were 65 years of age or older. For every 100 females there were 116.4 males, and for every 100 females age 18 and over there were 120.3 males age 18 and over.

99.6% of residents lived in urban areas, while 0.4% lived in rural areas.

There were 6,402 households in Pendleton, of which 29.3% had children under the age of 18 living in them. Of all households, 39.6% were married-couple households, 19.8% were households with a male householder and no spouse or partner present, and 30.7% were households with a female householder and no spouse or partner present. About 32.3% of all households were made up of individuals and 14.0% had someone living alone who was 65 years of age or older.

There were 6,938 housing units, of which 7.7% were vacant. Among occupied housing units, 54.8% were owner-occupied and 45.2% were renter-occupied. The homeowner vacancy rate was 2.0% and the rental vacancy rate was 7.0%.

Racial composition as of the 2020 census
Race	Number	Percent
White	13,511	79.0%
Black or African American	261	1.5%
American Indian and Alaska Native	671	3.9%
Asian	198	1.2%
Native Hawaiian and Other Pacific Islander	36	0.2%
Some other race	1,037	6.1%
Two or more races	1,393	8.1%
Hispanic or Latino (of any race)	1,957	11.4%

=== 2010 census ===
As of the census of 2010, there were 16,612 people, 6,220 households, and 3,789 families residing in the city. The population density was 1,579.1 inhabitants per square mile (609.7/km^{2}). There were 6,800 housing units at an average density of 646.4 per square mile (249.6/km^{2}). The racial makeup of the city was 87.3% White, 1.4% African American, 3.2% Native American, 1.1% Asian, 0.2% Pacific Islander, 3.6% from other races, and 3.3% from two or more races. Hispanic or Latino of any race were 9.7% of the population.

There were 6,220 households, of which 30.5% had children under the age of 18 living with them, 42.9% were married couples living together, 12.6% had a female householder with no husband present, 5.5% had a male householder with no wife present, and 39.1% were non-families. 31.3% of all households were made up of individuals, and 11.1% had someone living alone who was 65 years of age or older. The average household size was 2.37 and the average family size was 2.96.

The median age in the city was 36.9 years. 21.9% of residents were under the age of 18; 11.1% were between the ages of 18 and 24; 28% were from 25 to 44; 26.3% were from 45 to 64; and 12.8% were 65 years of age or older. The gender makeup of the city was 53.4% male and 46.6% female.

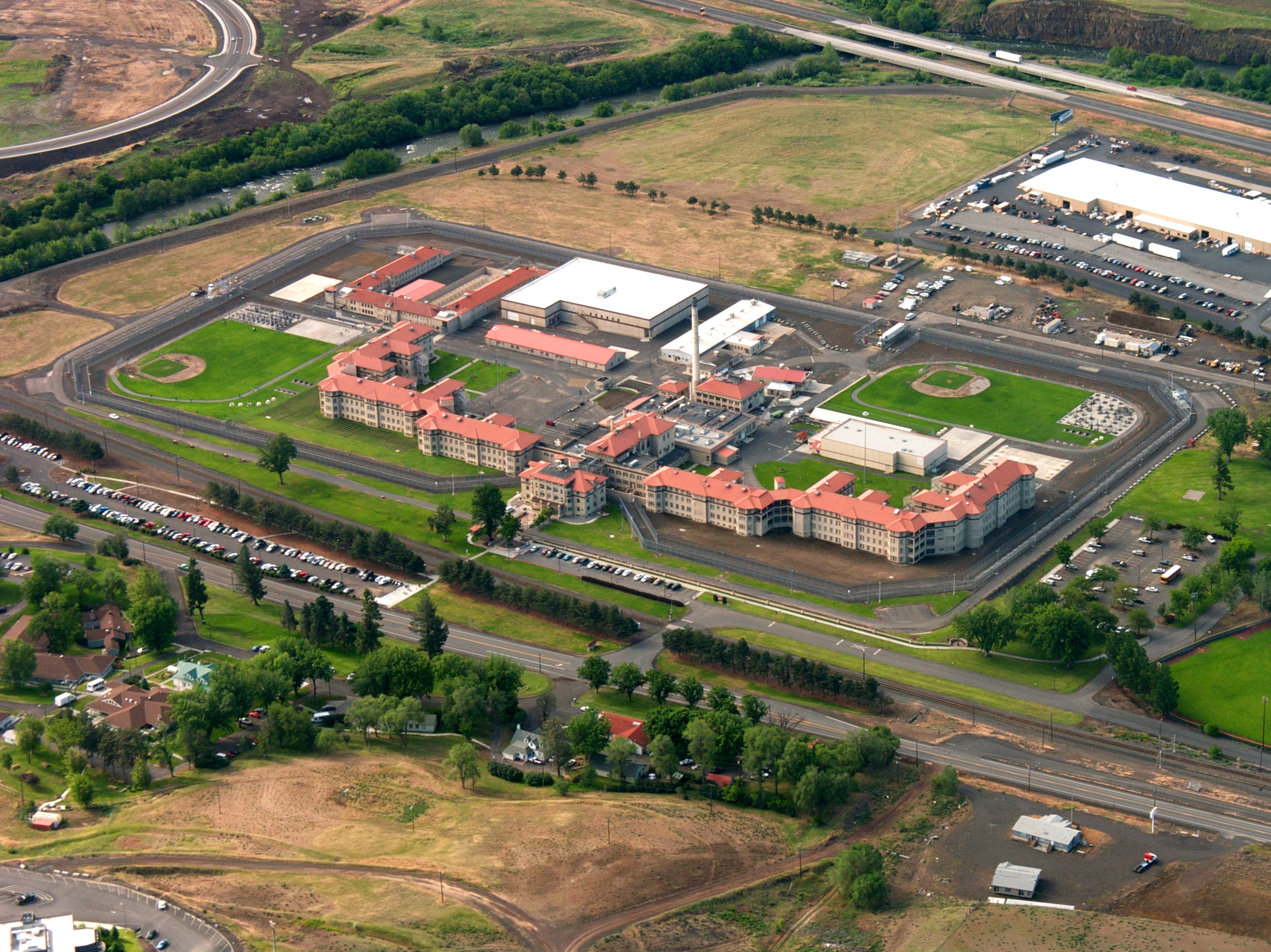
The EOCI prison is one of the largest employers in Pendleton.

=== 2000 census ===
As of 2000 the median income for a household in the city was $36,800, and the median income for a family was $47,410. Males had a median income of $31,763 versus $23,858 for females. The per capita income for the city was $17,551. About 8.7% of families and 13.3% of the population were below the poverty line, including 16.4% of those under age 18 and 8.1% of those age 65 or over.

== Arts and culture ==
=== Annual events ===
In addition to the woolen mills, Pendleton is also famous for its annual rodeo, the Pendleton Round-Up. First held in 1910, it is part of the Professional Rodeo Cowboys Association (PRCA)-sanctioned rodeo circuit. It is among the top ten PRCA venues in terms of prize money.

Pendleton is also home to the annual Pendleton Whiskey Music Festival . This annual event is held in the historic Pendleton Round-up Arena in July. Past performers have included Maroon 5, Toby Keith, Zac Brown Band, Pitbull, Blake Shelton, and Post Malone.

The Festival of Trees is held in early December each year. It is a fundraising event produced by the St. Anthony Hospital Foundation.

=== Museums and other points of interest ===
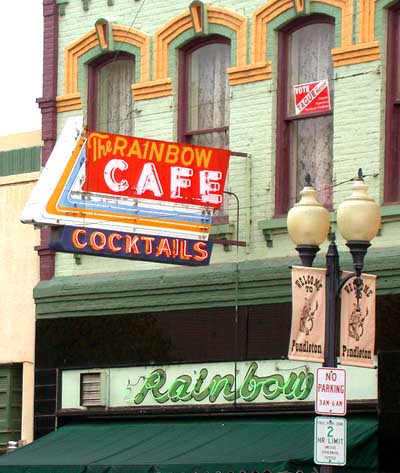
Historic Rainbow Cafe in downtown Pendleton (before 2006 façade restoration)

Local arts institutions include the Pendleton Center for the Arts (in the town's old Carnegie Library building) and Crow's Shadow Institute of the Arts on the nearby Umatilla Indian Reservation.

The Heritage Station Museum operated by the Umatilla County Historical Society is located in the historic 1909 Pendleton Train Depot. The museum offers two galleries covering regional and local history as well as a one-room schoolhouse, family cabin, caboose, barn, and signal house.

The Pendleton Farmers' Market operates on Friday evenings from May through October on South Main Street.

Pendleton Underground Tours features the history of Pendleton and a tour through the tunnels and the brothels. It is open year-round.

== Sports and recreation ==
The city hosts the annual Oregon School Activities Association 2A basketball tournament at the Pendleton Convention Center. Eight teams of boys and eight of girls compete for their respective championships during a four-day tournament. Civic leaders regard the influx of family and other fans the second-most important boost to the local economy, behind the Round-Up. Total attendance at the tournament in 2010 exceeded 13,000.

The Pendleton Aquatic Center, managed by Pendleton Parks & Recreation, features two tower water slides as well tubes and smaller slides, three pools, a diving well, and picnic areas. The aquatic center is adjacent to the high school.

== Transportation ==
Highways serving Pendleton include Interstate 84 and U.S. Route 30 running east–west and U.S. Route 395 running north–south. The city is also served by Oregon Route 37 and Oregon Route 11.

Pendleton lies along the Union Pacific Railroad (UP), constructed originally through the area in the 1880s by the Oregon Railway and Navigation Company (OR&N). In 1880, the OR&N began construction of a rail line from Portland through the Columbia Gorge to eastern Oregon. It reached Umatilla and Wallula in 1881, Pendleton in 1882, and then La Grande, Baker City, and Huntington, where by 1884 it met the UP line from Utah. Since Pendleton was also connected by rail to the Northern Pacific line at Wallula and Walla Walla, by 1885 it was a stop on two transcontinental lines. The UP absorbed the OR&N line in 1889.

Between 1977 and 1997, the city was a regular stop along the former route of Amtrak's Pioneer between Chicago and Seattle via Salt Lake City and Portland.

Regional public aviation service is through Eastern Oregon Regional Airport, 3 miles (5 km) outside Pendleton. The airport is owned by the City of Pendleton. Boutique Air offers daily flights between Pendleton and Portland, which began in 2016.

== Media ==
Two newspapers are published in Pendleton. The East Oregonian is a daily with a circulation of about 6,800. The Pendleton Record is a weekly with a circulation of about 900.

KFFX-TV (Fox 11), a television station based in Pendleton, serves a market that also includes the Washington cities of Yakima, Pasco, Richland, and Kennewick. Oregon radio stations based in or near Pendleton include: KTIX (1240 AM); KUMA (1290 AM); OPB station KRBM (90.9 FM); KLKY (96.1 FM) with translator K237DS (95.3 FM); KNHK-FM (101.9) with translator K262CJ (100.3 FM); KWHT (103.5 FM); and KWVN-FM (107.7).

== Notable people ==
- Tracy Baker – Major League Baseball player; born in Pendleton
- Walter S. Bowman, professional photographer; based in Pendleton from the late 1880s to mid-1930s
- John Bunnell – hosted World's Wildest Police Videos; born in Pendleton
- Dave Cockrum – comic book artist; born in Pendleton
- Dave Kingman – Major League Baseball player, three-time All-Star; born in Pendleton
- Michael J. Kopetski – former representative for Oregon's 5th congressional district; born in Pendleton
- James Lavadour – painter; lifelong resident of Umatilla Reservation
- Bob Lilly – Pro Football Hall of Fame defensive tackle; graduated from Pendleton High School in 1957
- Donald McKay – scout and leader of the Warm Springs Indians during the Modoc War
- William Cameron McKay, Oregon pioneer physician, scout
- Elaine Miles – actress who played Marilyn Whirlwind on Northern Exposure; early childhood on Umatilla Reservation
- Frances Moore Lappé – author and activist; born in Pendleton
- Lee Moorhouse - Indian agent in Pendleton and amateur photographer
- Charles Sams - Director of the National Park Service; native of Pendleton
- Shoni Schimmel - WNBA player
- Roy Schuening – football player, Oregon State and NFL; born in Pendleton
- Gordon Smith – 1997–2009 U.S. Senator (R) from Oregon, born in Pendleton
- Milan Smith – judge on United States Court of Appeals for the Ninth Circuit; born in Pendleton
- Kenneth Snelson – sculptor and photographer; childhood in Pendleton
- Dan Straily – Major League Baseball player; grew up in Pendleton
- Archie R. Twitchell - test pilot and actor
- Quade Winter, opera singer

== Sister cities ==
Pendleton has a sister city relationship with Marikina, a municipality-turned-city in the Philippines. The relationship was established in 1971 when then mayor Eddie O. Knopp and Marikina mayor Osmundo de Guzman had their daughters temporarily switch schools in their respective towns. By 1974, Knopp visited Marikina after Philippine president Ferdinand Marcos declared a nationwide martial law two years prior, and expressed that based on the "excellent peace and order situation" he saw while in the country, the United States could try implementing martial law in towns rampant with violence and crime.

Another sister city of Pendleton is the town of Minamisōma, in Fukushima Prefecture, Japan. Minamisoma is 16 miles (26 km) north of the Fukushima Daiichi Nuclear Power Plant, which was damaged by the 2011 Tōhoku earthquake and tsunami. Since then, Japanese exchange students from Minamisoma have continued to visit Pendleton, though students from Pendleton have stopped visiting Minamisoma over growing radiation concerns.

== See also ==
- McKay, Oregon
- McKay Creek National Wildlife Refuge
- McKay Reservoir
