= John Kyme (MP for Lewes) =

English politician

John Kyme or Cayme (by 1491 – ca. 1546–1553) was a 16th-century English politician.

He was a member (MP) of the parliament of England for Lewes in 1542.
