= Kuma, Ehime =

Town in Japan

Kuma (久万町, Kuma-chō) was a town located in Kamiukena District, Ehime, Japan.

As of 2003, the town had an estimated population of 7,043 and a density of 42.71 persons per km^{2}. The total area was 164.92 km^{2}.

On August 1, 2004, Kuma, along with the villages of Mikawa, Omogo and Yanadani (all from Kamiukena District), was merged to create the town of Kumakōgen and no longer exists as an independent municipality.

== Climate ==
Climate data for Kuma (1991−2020 normals, extremes 1978−present)
Month	Jan	Feb	Mar	Apr	May	Jun	Jul	Aug	Sep	Oct	Nov	Dec	Year
Record high °C (°F)	17.6 (63.7)	22.0 (71.6)	23.9 (75.0)	29.1 (84.4)	31.3 (88.3)	33.5 (92.3)	35.9 (96.6)	36.5 (97.7)	34.6 (94.3)	30.5 (86.9)	26.0 (78.8)	21.6 (70.9)	36.5 (97.7)
Mean daily maximum °C (°F)	6.4 (43.5)	8.1 (46.6)	12.3 (54.1)	18.2 (64.8)	22.9 (73.2)	25.5 (77.9)	29.5 (85.1)	30.5 (86.9)	26.5 (79.7)	21.0 (69.8)	15.1 (59.2)	9.0 (48.2)	18.8 (65.8)
Daily mean °C (°F)	1.6 (34.9)	2.5 (36.5)	6.1 (43.0)	11.4 (52.5)	16.3 (61.3)	20.1 (68.2)	24.0 (75.2)	24.5 (76.1)	20.7 (69.3)	14.6 (58.3)	8.8 (47.8)	3.6 (38.5)	12.9 (55.1)
Mean daily minimum °C (°F)	−2.5 (27.5)	−2.2 (28.0)	0.6 (33.1)	5.2 (41.4)	10.4 (50.7)	15.7 (60.3)	19.9 (67.8)	20.3 (68.5)	16.4 (61.5)	9.8 (49.6)	4.0 (39.2)	−0.7 (30.7)	8.1 (46.5)
Record low °C (°F)	−11.3 (11.7)	−13.6 (7.5)	−12.2 (10.0)	−4.7 (23.5)	−.6 (30.9)	5.3 (41.5)	10.5 (50.9)	12.1 (53.8)	4.2 (39.6)	−1.2 (29.8)	−4.2 (24.4)	−12.4 (9.7)	−13.6 (7.5)
Average precipitation mm (inches)	89.0 (3.50)	98.5 (3.88)	135.5 (5.33)	131.0 (5.16)	164.5 (6.48)	290.0 (11.42)	286.9 (11.30)	224.3 (8.83)	246.8 (9.72)	134.6 (5.30)	97.8 (3.85)	105.0 (4.13)	2,006.5 (79.00)
Average precipitation days (≥ 1.0 mm)	12.1	11.3	13.3	10.9	10.0	14.0	12.2	10.9	11.1	9.1	9.5	12.3	136.7
Mean monthly sunshine hours	98.8	114.3	152.4	181.2	192.3	126.8	156.3	177.1	137.2	149.1	123.9	101.6	1,719.4
Source: JMA
