= Pendleton High School (Oregon) =

Location
- 1800 NW Carden Ave; Pendleton, (Umatilla County), Oregon 97801; United States
- 45.674849°N 118.805101°W

Information
- School district: Pendleton School District
- Principal: Curt Thompson
- Teaching staff: 39.20 (FTE)
- Grades: 9–12
- Enrollment: 773 (2023-2024)
- Student to teacher ratio: 19.72
- Colors: Green and Gold
- Athletics conference: OSAA 4A-6 Greater Oregon League
- Mascot: Bucky
- Team name: Buckaroos
- Rival: The Dalles High School
- Website: hs.pendleton.k12.or.us

Pendleton High School (PHS) is a public high school located in Pendleton, Oregon, United States.

Pendleton photographer Walter S. Bowman photographed some of the school's teams in the early 20th century.

== Academics ==
In 2008, 92% of the school's seniors received a high school diploma. Of 208 students, 192 graduated, nine dropped out, one received a modified diploma, and six were still in high school the following year.

In 2022, 90% of the school's seniors received a high school diploma. Of 216 students, 195 graduated, and 21 dropped out.

== Athletics ==
Prior to the 2022-2023 School year, Pendleton High School athletic teams competed in the OSAA 5A-4 Intermountain Conference. As of the 2022-2023 school year, Pendleton High School Competes in the OSAA 4A-6 Greater Oregon League.

The Pendleton High School athletics department currently holds the following state titles:

- Boys Basketball: 1931
- Dance/Drill: 2001, 2008, 2009, 2010, 2011, 2012, 2013, 2018, 2019
- Football: 1913
- Girls Golf: 2019
- Softball: 2012, 2014, 2018, 2022

== Notable alumni ==
- George Christensen, former NFL player
- Bob Lilly, nicknamed "Mr. Cowboy", former defensive tackle for the Dallas Cowboys, photographer, and member of the Pro Football Hall of Fame
- Charles Sams, director of the National Park Service
- Roy Schuening, former NFL player
- Dan Straily (born 1988), starting pitcher in the Philadelphia Phillies organization (grades 9-10)
- Mark Temple, former NFL player
