= Blair Garner =

American radio personality

Blair Garner is an American radio personality best known for his work in country radio. Garner spent over two decades as a nationally syndicated overnight disc jockey, first hosting After Midnite for Premiere Networks and then The Blair Garner Show for Nash FM; in-between, he hosted the morning drive time program America's Morning Show, also for Nash FM.

As a radio host and DJ, he won the Academy of Country Music's On-Air Personality of the Year award in 2004 and 2006. Garner has also been nominated for the prestigious Marconi Award and for Nationally Syndicated Air Personality by Billboard Magazine. Over his career, Garner has worked at stations across the country, including Dallas, Washington, D.C., Houston, New York City and Los Angeles. He has also used the names "Skye Walker" (in New York) and "Blair Michaels" (in Los Angeles).

== The radio shows ==
Garner's programs focus on country music hits, along with recent music news and chat about pop culture. In addition, Garner is recognized as one of Nashville's best interviewers. Country music's top stars, including Garth Brooks, Taylor Swift, Tim McGraw, Blake Shelton, and Reba McEntire have made it a point to appear on Blair's show to promote their projects. Garner has also interviewed stars outside of Nashville, including Pharrell Williams, Pete Buttigieg, Zendaya, Pete Wentz, Kevin Costner, Gwyneth Paltrow, Lionel Richie, Henry Winkler, Joan Rivers, Kathie Lee Gifford, and WWE and UFC stars such as Stone Cold Steve Austin, John Cena and Brock Lesnar.

From 1993 to 2013, Garner hosted a show he created called After Midnite. The show amassed an affiliate base of over 300 American and Canadian cities. After three years of ownership, he sold the program to Premiere Networks. As of 2021, Premiere continues to use the name for its overnight country show, hosted by Cody Alan from 2013 to 2021, then Granger Smith from 2022 onward.

In 2009, Garner moved the show from Los Angeles to Nashville where he hosted the show until 2013, when he left to helm "America's Morning Show" for Cumulus Media. That show launched initially in New York City on WNSH (New York City's Nash FM affiliate).

Cumulus Media (whose syndication company Westwood One competes with Premiere) then took the morning show, into national syndication.

In 2016, Garner's stepped away from the grueling demands of morning drive, and elected to return to his former overnight time slot with "The Blair Garner Show". Garner made the move after his young daughter complained of his work interfering with their family life.

In 2019, Cumulus Media blocked Garner from airing an interview with 2020 Democratic Party candidate Pete Buttigieg. Buttigieg is the first major party presidential candidate in a same-sex marriage. While Garner has discussed the challenges of his coming out to a country radio audience, he said that was not part of his interview with Buttigieg. Garner instead put the interview on SoundCloud.

In July 2020, Westwood One announced that Garner's show was being cancelled, as part of a much-larger programming restructure. The show was last broadcast on August 9, 2020. Once that news broke, Garner was then free to announce what he and his husband had been working on for two years behind the scenes—The Mulehouse. The Mulehouse is slated for an April 2021 opening, and is heralded to be the first-of-its-kind music/concert venue designed for worldwide live-streaming events.

== Awards ==
Garner has nine Billboard Broadcast awards, three Academy of Country Music’s “On-Air Personality of the Year” Awards in the national category (2004, 2006 and 2010). He's received four CMA nominations, a nomination for the prestigious Marconi Award, and is a member of both the National Radio Hall of Fame and the Country Radio Hall of Fame.
