= KWVN-FM =

- Pendleton, Oregon; United States
- Broadcast area: Walla Walla, Washington
- Frequency: 107.7 MHz
- Branding: 107.7 HOT FM

Programming
- Format: Top 40 (CHR)

Ownership
- Owner: Elkhorn Media Group; (EMG2, LLC)
- Sister stations: KCMB, KTEL, KTIX, KUMA, KUMA-FM, KWHT, KWRL

History
- First air date: October 1, 1978 (as KUMA-FM)
- Former call signs: KUMA-FM (1978–1989); KSXM (1989–1993); KUMA-FM (1993–2010)
- Call sign meaning: K W The ViNe (previous format)

Technical information
- Licensing authority: FCC
- Facility ID: 57757
- Class: C1
- ERP: 75,000 watts
- HAAT: 340 meters (1,120 ft)
- Transmitter coordinates: 45°35′27″N 118°34′47″W
- Translators: 95.3 K237DM (Walla Walla); 100.1 K261BH (Heppner)

Links
- Public license information: Public file; LMS
- Webcast: Listen Live
- Website: www.mycolumbiabasin.com/about-us/

KWVN-FM (107.7 FM, "107.7 Hot FM") is a commercial radio station licensed to serve Pendleton, Oregon, United States. The station, originally launched in October 1978, is currently owned by Randolph and Debra McKone's Elkhorn Media Group and the broadcast license is held by EMG2, LLC.

== Programming ==
KWVN-FM broadcasts an adult hits music format to the greater Columbia Basin area. Notable syndicated programming includes American Top 40 with Ryan Seacrest on Sunday mornings.

== History ==
This station began regular broadcasting on October 1, 1978, broadcasting with 27,500 watts on 107.7 MHz as KUMA-FM, sister station to KUMA (1290 AM). Under the ownership of the Pendleton Broadcasting Company, KUMA-FM aired a "bright and beautiful" music format.

KUMA-FM was founded by Theodore A. "Ted" Smith and his wife Phyllis as part of Pendleton Broadcasting Company, a business that Ted Smith joined in 1955 after his service in the United States Navy. In September 1988, Ted and Phyllis Smith applied to the FCC to transfer control of the Pendleton Broadcasting Company to Gregory A. Smith, their son. The deal was approved by the FCC on November 18, 1988. The younger Smith applied to the FCC for a new callsign and the station was assigned KSXM on August 1, 1989. KSXM dropped most of the simulcast with the AM station and adopted a classic rock music format.

Logo as KUMA-FM

In March 1993, Pendleton Broadcasting Company, Inc., reached an agreement to sell this station and sister station KUMA-FM to Capps Broadcast Group's Round-Up Radio, Inc. The deal was approved by the FCC on July 1, 1993, and the transaction was consummated on the same day. The station applied to the FCC for the return of its original callsign and this request was granted on September 24, 1993.

On January 11, 2010, KUMA-FM changed their call sign to KWVN-FM. On January 27, 2010, KWVN-FM changed their format to adult hits, branded as "107.7 The Vine".

On February 2, 2015, KWVN-FM changed their format to Top 40 (CHR), branded as "107.7 Hot FM".

KWVN-FM today primarily targets the Walla Walla valley and Milton-Freewater, OR. Signal and geographic limitations from the current tower location make KWVN unsuitable to rebrand as a Tri-Cities area FM station without a booster service to fill in areas of Kennewick shielded by terrain.

Effective November 1, 2017, Capps Broadcast Group sold KWVN-FM and nine other broadcast properties to Elkhorn Media Group for $1.75 million.

== Facilities ==
KWVN-FM shares a studio building with sister stations KTIX (1240 AM), KUMA (1290 AM), and KWHT (103.5 FM). This multi-station facility is located at the west end of Eastern Oregon Regional Airport. KWVN-FM broadcasts from a tower that originally served as the broadcast tower for KTIX from 1941 to 2002. It was removed from its original South Hill location and re-erected on Cabbage Hill for the FM station's use.

== Translators ==
KWVN-FM programming is also carried on multiple broadcast translator stations to extend or improve the coverage area of the station.

Call sign	Frequency	City of license	FID	ERP (W)	Class	FCC info
K237DM	95.3 FM	Walla Walla, Washington	150562	115	D	LMS
K261BH	100.1 FM	Heppner, Oregon	52138	48	D	LMS

The then-KUMA-FM translators made headlines in March 1994 when the FCC shut down a quarter-watt pirate radio station in Condon, Oregon, operated by Bill Roberts on the same frequency as one of the translator stations, causing interference. Roberts, who ran the station from his bedroom with a focus on community news and local sports, believed the operation to be legal but agents from the FCC's Portland, Oregon, field office informed him otherwise and ordered the shutdown.
