= KTEL (AM) =

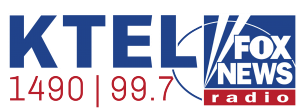
- Walla Walla, Washington; United States
- Frequency: 1490 kHz
- Branding: Fox News Radio

Programming
- Format: News/talk

Ownership
- Owner: Elkhorn Media Group; (EMG2, LLC)
- Sister stations: KTIX, KWHT, KWVN-FM

History
- First air date: 1960

Technical information
- Licensing authority: FCC
- Facility ID: 12511
- Class: C
- Power: 1,000 watts
- Transmitter coordinates: 46°01′24″N 118°21′21″W
- Translator: 99.7 K259CR (Milton-Freewater, Oregon)

Links
- Public license information: Public file; LMS
- Webcast: Listen Live
- Website: https://elkhornmediagroup.com/columbia-basin/

KTEL (1490 kHz, "Fox News Radio") is an AM radio station broadcasting a news/talk format. Licensed to Walla Walla, Washington, United States, the station is currently owned by Randolph and Debra McKone's Elkhorn Media Group, through its licensee EMG2, LLC, and features programming from Citadel Media, ESPN Radio, and Premiere Radio Networks. The station was founded by Jack Keating in the 1950s.
