= Battle of Sand Butte =

1873 battle of the Modoc War

Coordinates: 41.760°N 121.524°W

- Part of Modoc War (Indian Wars)
Date	26 April 1873
Location	South of Captain Jack's Stronghold, California
Result	Modoc victory

Belligerents
Modoc	United States; Warm Springs Indians

Commanders and leaders
Scarface Charley; Kientpoos	Donald McKay; Evan Thomas †; Thomas Wright †

Strength
20–30 warriors	~70 soldiers ~12 Indian scouts

Casualties and losses
None	35 casualties

The Battle of Sand Butte between the Modoc Indians and the United States Army was a part of the Modoc War in California. On April 26, 1873, a force of ~70 Army soldiers and ~12 Warm Springs Indians scouts went looking for a group of Modoc who had escaped a previous assault attempt by the Army. Mid-day, the Army and Warm Springs Indians were ambushed at the base of Sand Butte, and nearly wiped out by 20 Modoc warriors. The Modoc victory lead to further public calls for their extermination.

== Background ==
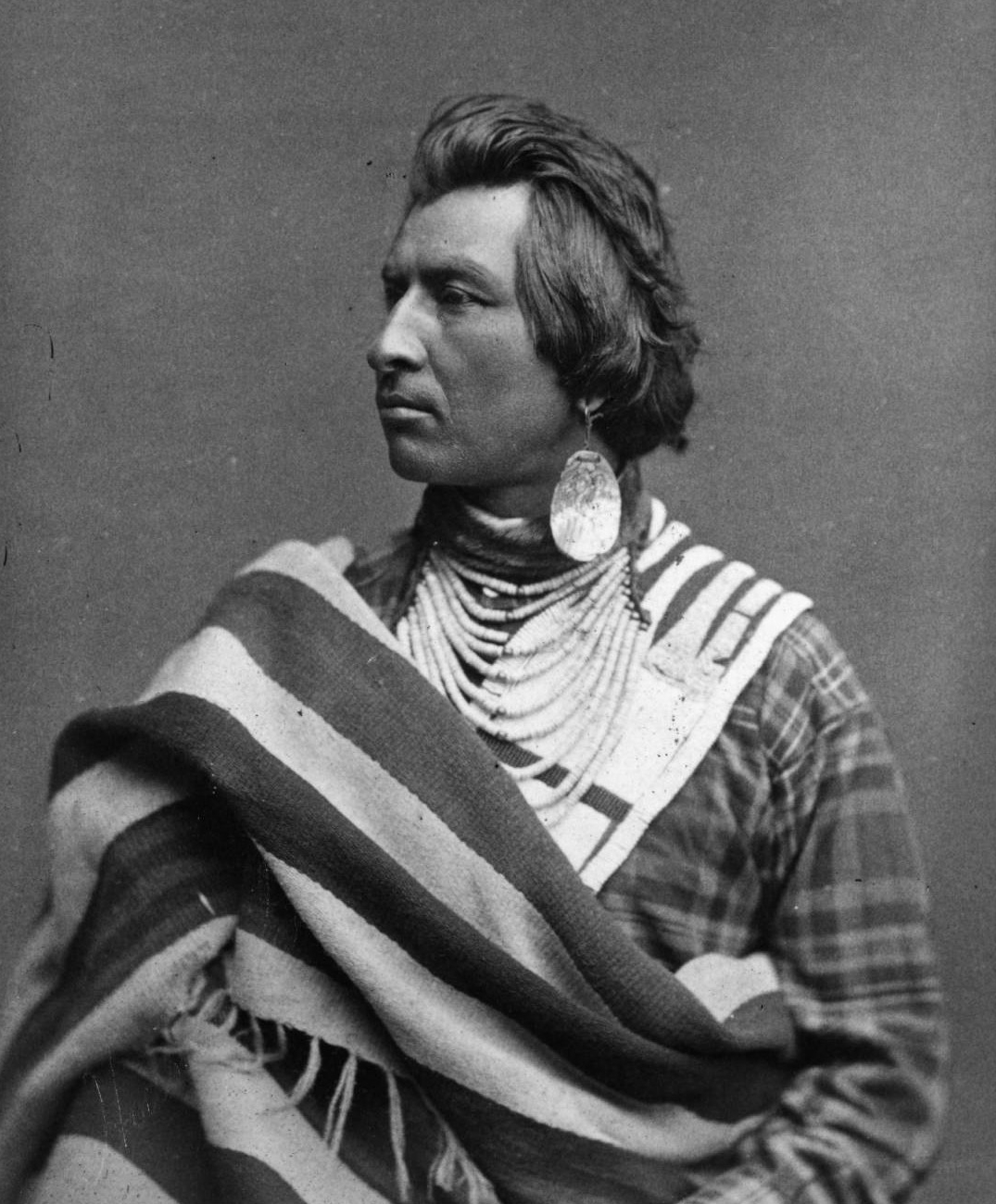
Donald McKay

In the spring of 1873, during the Modoc War, the U.S.' War Department authorized Donald McKay, a mixed-race mercenary who was leader of the Warm Springs Indians, to recruit 100 of his tribe to fight the Modoc people in California. In the 1860s, McKay had fought against the Northern Paiutes with a band of Warm Springs Indians. In April 1873, General Edward Canby and a reverend named Thomas were killed by the Modocs, and in response, the U.S. Army and Warm Springs Indians attempted to capture a Modoc base, the Stronghold, near Medicine Lake Volcano. They planned an assault on the Stronghold on April 18. On the 17th, hours before the assault, most of the Modoc abandoned the Stronghold. The next day, when the Army and Warm Springs Indians arrived, the Modoc that were present were women, the elderly, and the wounded. The women were given to the Warm Springs Indians, and the elderly and wounded were burned.

== Prelude ==
On the morning of April 26, about 70 Army soldiers left their camp next to the Stronghold, Gillem's Camp, and went south, hoping to find the Modoc. They assumed the Modoc were hiding east of the hill Sand Butte, which was four miles south of the Stronghold. They wanted to bring a mortar battery to the butte's summit so they could easily fire at the Modoc. This early morning party was led by Captain Evan Thomas and Lieutenant Thomas Wright. During the walk, they were spread out in a line left-to-right.

The Modoc in the area were led by Kientpoos (who killed Edward Canby) and Scarface Charley, and numbered at 20 to 30. They carried rifles. They could easily tell where the patrols were, as they were fully visible and making noise. They formed a parallel line to the patrols, and stayed out of sight as they walked up from behind. Around noon, the patrols stopped at the base of Sand Butte (to the east) to eat, rest, and watch the arrival of Donald McKay and his troops. The area was flat grassland surrounded by ridges on all four sides, and was 200 feet below the top of Sand Butte. McKay and a dozen scouts met with the patrols at noon.

== Battle ==
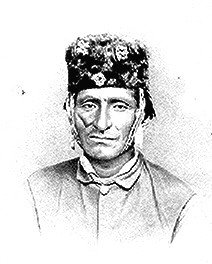
Scarface Charley

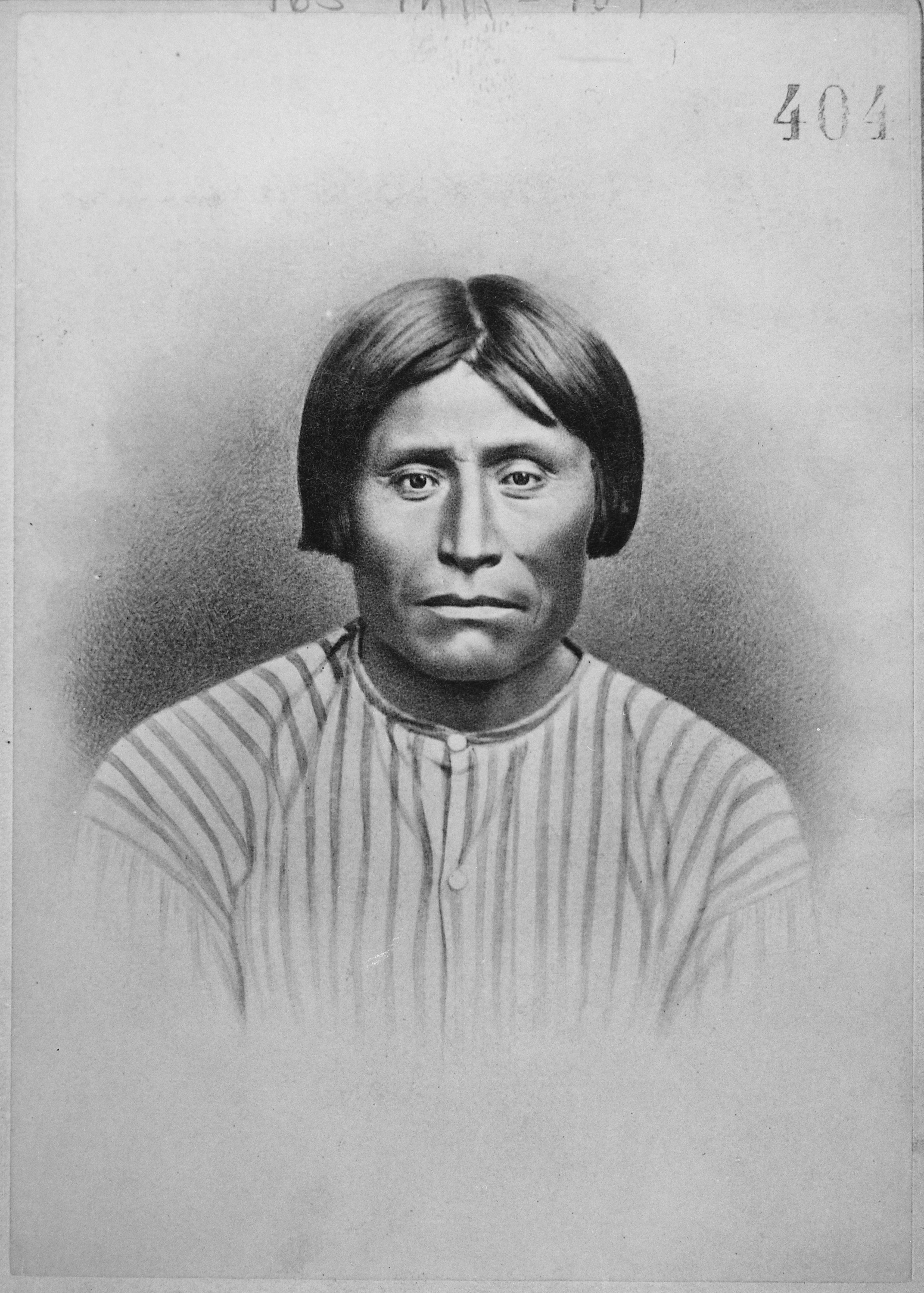
Kientpoos

Soon after the patrols were resting, the Modoc got into position. Kientpoos and Charley's group went to an area of trees at the northern face of Sand Butte. They were flanked by two other squads to their north and south, and a few others were to their west at an overlook ridge. No matter which way the patrols would run, they would be under gunfire from the Modoc at high ground.

After the patrols finished their lunch, Thomas ordered three soldiers to take up a picket position on top of the ridge. When those soldiers started going up the butte, the Modoc realized they would be spotted, and started firing at the pickets. Back at Gillem's Camp, the sound of gunfire was heard, and some became worried, but considering the Army's numbers, they assumed the patrols would win the battle at any moment. Many patrols fled, and in the confusion, some of them attacked the Warm Springs scouts that were coming to help them. At 1:30 p.m., some patrols got back to Gillem's Camp, and warned about the Modoc ambush. They were so panicked, their reports were considered unreliable. Eventually, the camp's namesake, Gillem, ordered a unit stationed at the Stronghold to go to Sand Butte, but they were arriving as dark came. The patrols started building low rock walls for protection, and planned to stay the night. More patrols reached Gillem's Camp at midnight, and they were directed to the Stronghold, where they found Warm Springs scouts who would go back to Sand Butte to help the army rescue the patrols. The scouts could not find their way in the dark, and the rescue was put off until the next morning. At the end of the battle, Scarface Charley allegedly told the soldiers, "All you fellows that ain't dead yet had better go home. We don't want to kill you all in one day". The next day, the rescue mission found the soldiers' bodies. The army had 36 casualties, and five officers, including Evan Thomas and Thomas Wright, were killed.

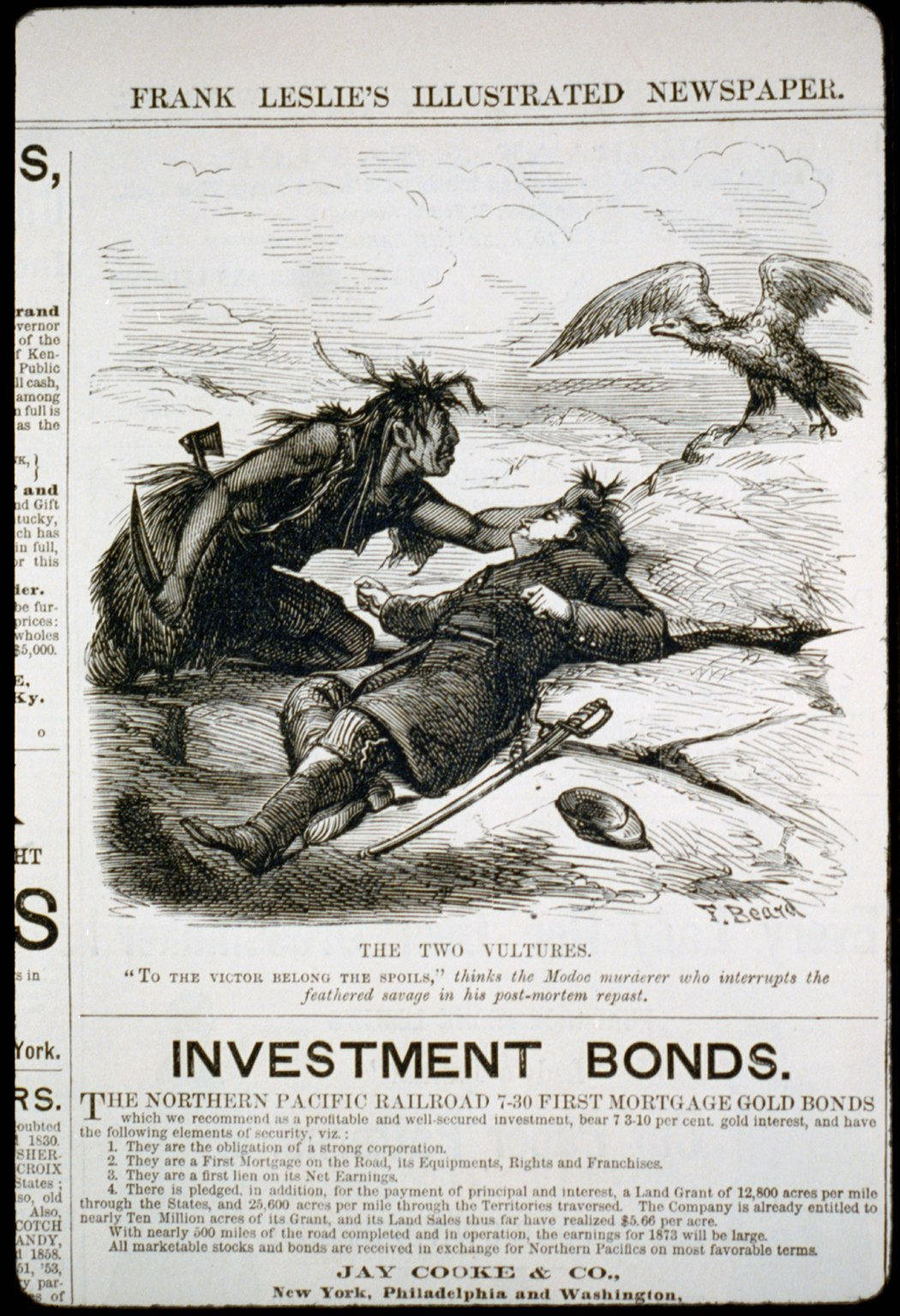
"The Two Vultures", which depicts the aftermath of the battle

== Aftermath ==
The Modoc escape from the Stronghold and the victory at Sand Butte turned the public's sentiment further against them, and there were greater calls for their extermination. Various newsletters, including Harper's Weekly and Frank Leslie's Illustrated Newsletter, portrayed the battle in illustrations which evoked "Indian savagery". Harper's illustration was titled "Modoc Scalping and Torturing Soldiers". Frank Leslie's illustration, which showed an Indian scalping an army soldier while a vulture is perched nearby, was titled "The Two Vultures", and captioned, "'To the victor belong [sic] the spoils', thinks the Modoc murderer who interrupts the feathered savage in his post-mortem repast".

== Sources ==
- Cothran, Boyd (2014). Remembering the Modoc War: Redemptive Violence and the Making of American Innocence, University of North Carolina Press. ISBN 9781469618609
- McNally, Robert (2017). The Modoc War: A Story of Genocide at the Dawn of America's Gilded Age, Bison Books. ISBN 9781496201799
