= National military park =

Military Parks of the United States

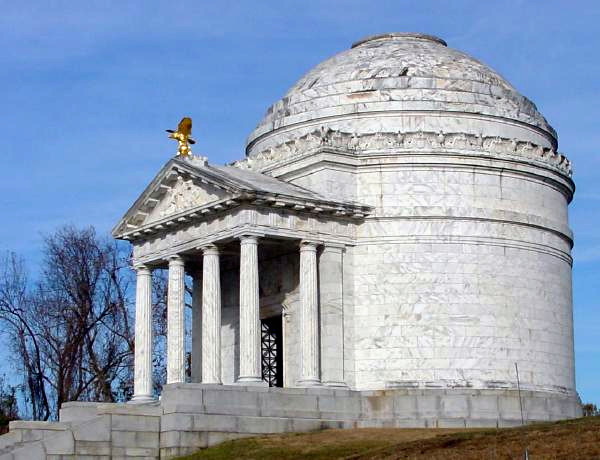
Vicksburg National Military Park, Illinois Memorial

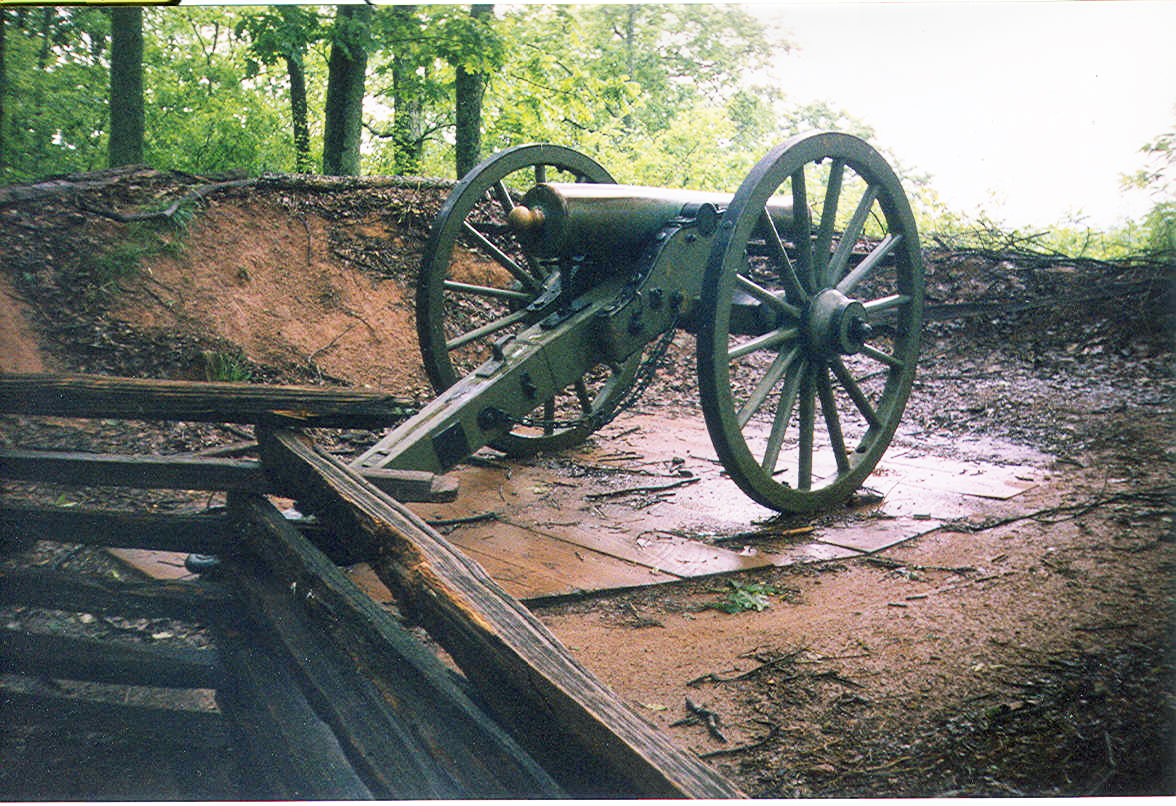
Kennesaw Mountain National Battlefield Park

National Military Park, National Battlefield, National Battlefield Park, and National Battlefield Site are four designations for 25 battle sites preserved by the United States federal government because of their national importance. The designation applies to "sites where historic battles were fought on American soil during the armed conflicts that shaped the growth and development of the United States...."

There are eleven National Battlefields (NB), nine National Military Parks (NMP), four National Battlefield Parks (NBP), and one National Battlefield Site (NBS). The National Park Service does not distinguish among the four designations in terms of their preservation or management policies.

Seventeen sites are from the American Civil War, four from the American Revolutionary War, one from the War of 1812, one from the French and Indian War, and two were attacks on Native Americans. Big Hole is the only site in the Western United States.

In 1890, Chickamauga and Chattanooga National Military Park was the first such site created by Congress. Originally these sites were maintained by the War Department, but were transferred to the National Park Service on August 10, 1933. The different designations appear to represent Congressional attitudes at the time of authorization of each individual site, although "park" appears to be reserved for the larger sites. Only Brices Cross Roads National Battlefield Site, which is small, still bears that designation; others have since been redesignated. Some battlefields are designated as National Monuments, such as Little Bighorn Battlefield National Monument, Mill Springs Battlefield National Monument, and ten forts, several of which saw battle; National Historical Parks, such as Harpers Ferry National Historical Park and Cedar Creek and Belle Grove National Historical Park; or National Historic Sites, such as Sand Creek Massacre National Historic Site.

As with all historic areas in the National Park System, these battle sites are automatically listed on the National Register of Historic Places.

== List of areas ==
Name	Image	Location	Type	Established	Area	Conflict	Battle(s)	Website
Antietam		Maryland; 39°28′13″N 77°44′17″W	NB	August 30, 1890	3,228.89 acres (13.1 km^{2}; 5.0 sq mi)	Civil War	Antietam	
Big Hole		Montana; 45°38′15″N 113°38′37″W	NB	June 23, 1910	975.61 acres (3.9 km^{2}; 1.5 sq mi)	Nez Perce War of the Indian Wars	The Big Hole	
Brices Cross Roads		Mississippi; 34°30′22.0″N 88°43′44.0″W	NBS	February 21, 1929	1.00 acre (0.0040 km^{2}; 0.00156 sq mi)	Civil War	Brice's Cross Roads	
Chickamauga and Chattanooga		Georgia, Tennessee; 34°56′24″N 85°15′36″W	NMP	August 19, 1890	9,523.48 acres (38.5 km^{2}; 14.9 sq mi)	Civil War	Chickamauga Chattanooga	
Cowpens		South Carolina; 35°08′12″N 81°49′05″W	NB	March 4, 1929	841.56 acres (3.4 km^{2}; 1.3 sq mi)	Revolutionary War	Cowpens	
Fort Donelson		Tennessee, Kentucky; 36°29′14″N 87°51′39″W	NB	August 10, 1933	1,319.00 acres (5.3 km^{2}; 2.1 sq mi)	Civil War	Fort Donelson Fort Henry	
Fort Necessity		Pennsylvania; 39°48′55″N 79°35′22″W	NB	March 4, 1931	902.80 acres (3.7 km^{2}; 1.4 sq mi)	French and Indian War	Fort Necessity	
Fredericksburg and Spotsylvania		Virginia; 38°17′35″N 77°28′09″W	NMP	February 14, 1927	8,405.46 acres (34.0 km^{2}; 13.1 sq mi)	Civil War	Fredericksburg Chancellorsville The Wilderness Spotsylvania Court House	
Gettysburg		Pennsylvania; 39°48′31″N 77°14′12″W	NMP	February 11, 1895	6,032.07 acres (24.4 km^{2}; 9.4 sq mi)	Civil War	Gettysburg	
Guilford Courthouse		North Carolina; 36°7′53″N 79°50′47″W	NMP	March 2, 1917	253.54 acres (1.0 km^{2}; 0.4 sq mi)	Revolutionary War	Guilford Court House	
Horseshoe Bend		Alabama; 32°58′15″N 85°44′18″W	NMP	July 25, 1956	2,040.00 acres (8.3 km^{2}; 3.2 sq mi)	Creek War of the Indian Wars	Horseshoe Bend	
Kennesaw Mountain		Georgia; 33°58′59″N 84°34′41″W	NBP	February 18, 1917	2,913.63 acres (11.8 km^{2}; 4.6 sq mi)	Civil War	Kennesaw Mountain	
Kings Mountain		South Carolina; 35°8′16″N 81°23′22″W	NMP	August 10, 1933	3,945.29 acres (16.0 km^{2}; 6.2 sq mi)	Revolutionary War	Kings Mountain	
Manassas		Virginia; 38°48′46″N 77°31′18″W	NBP	November 14, 1936	5,073.44 acres (20.5 km^{2}; 7.9 sq mi)	Civil War	First Manassas Second Manassas	
Monocacy		Maryland; 39.37115°N 77.39208°W	NB	June 21, 1934	1,646.88 acres (6.7 km^{2}; 2.6 sq mi)	Civil War	Monocacy	
Moores Creek		North Carolina; 34°27′29.6″N 78°06′37.1″W	NB	June 2, 1926	87.75 acres (0.4 km^{2}; 0.1 sq mi)	Revolutionary War	Moore's Creek Bridge	
Pea Ridge		Arkansas; 36°27′15.″N 94°02′04.9″W	NMP	July 20, 1956	4,300.35 acres (17.4 km^{2}; 6.7 sq mi)	Civil War	Pea Ridge	
Petersburg		Virginia; 37°13′10″N 77°21′41″W	NB	July 3, 1926	9,368.34 acres (37.9 km^{2}; 14.6 sq mi)	Civil War	Petersburg campaign	
Richmond		Virginia; 37°25′45″N 77°22′25″W	NBP	March 2, 1936	8,168.87 acres (33.1 km^{2}; 12.8 sq mi)	Civil War	Peninsula campaign and the Seven Days Battles Overland Campaign Petersburg campaign	
River Raisin		Michigan; 41°54′49″N 83°22′42″W	NBP	October 22, 2010	42.18 acres (0.2 km^{2}; 0.1 sq mi)	War of 1812	Frenchtown	
Shiloh		Tennessee, Mississippi; 35°08′12″N 88°20′26″W	NMP	December 27, 1894	9,323.70 acres (37.7 km^{2}; 14.6 sq mi)	Civil War	Shiloh	
Stones River		Tennessee; 35°52′34″N 86°25′51″W	NB	March 3, 1927	709.49 acres (2.9 km^{2}; 1.1 sq mi)	Civil War	Stones River	
Tupelo		Mississippi; 34°15′20.4″N 88°44′13.2″W	NB	August 11, 1933	1.00 acre (0.0040 km^{2}; 0.00156 sq mi)	Civil War	Tupelo	
Vicksburg		Mississippi, Louisiana; 32°21′55″N 90°50′32″W	NMP	February 21, 1899	2,524.11 acres (10.2 km^{2}; 3.9 sq mi)	Civil War	Vicksburg campaign	
Wilson's Creek		Missouri; 37°6′56″N 93°25′12″W	NB	April 22, 1960	2,407.79 acres (9.7 km^{2}; 3.8 sq mi)	Civil War	Wilson's Creek	

== Other battlefields in the National Park System ==
=== National Memorials ===
- Arkansas Post National Memorial preserves the site of battles in 1783 and 1863
- Fort Caroline National Memorial memorializes the destruction of Fort Caroline
- Pearl Harbor National Memorial preserves sites related to the Attack on Pearl Harbor
- Perry's Victory and International Peace Memorial commemorates the Battle of Lake Erie

=== National Monuments ===
- Aleutian Islands World War II National Monument preserves the site of the Battle of Attu
- Canyon de Chelly National Monument preserves the site of the Battle of Canyon de Chelly
- Castillo de San Marcos National Monument preserves a Spanish fort involved in numerous sieges
- Fort Frederica National Monument preserves the site of the Battle of Bloody Marsh
- Fort McHenry National Monument preserves Fort McHenry which played a crucial role in the Battle of Baltimore
- Fort Pulaski National Monument preserves Fort Pulaski, site of the Siege of Fort Pulaski
- Fort Stanwix National Monument preserves Fort Stanwix, site of the Siege of Fort Stanwix
- Lava Beds National Monument preserves several sites related to the Modoc War, including Captain Jack's Stronghold, the site of the First and Second Battle of the Stronghold
- Little Bighorn Battlefield National Monument preserves the site of the Battle of the Little Bighorn
- Mill Springs Battlefield National Monument preserves the site of the Battle of Mill Springs
- Pacific Islands Heritage Marine National Monument includes Wake Island, site of the Battle of Wake Island
- Papahānaumokuākea Marine National Monument includes Midway Atoll, involved in the Battle of Midway

=== National Historical Parks ===
- Appomattox Court House National Historical Park preserves the site of the Battle of Appomattox Court House
- Boston National Historical Park preserves several sites of the American Revolutionary War, including the Battle of Bunker Hill
- Cedar Creek and Belle Grove National Historical Park preserves the site of the Battle of Cedar Creek
- Colonial National Historical Park preserves the site of the Siege of Yorktown
- Fort Sumter and Fort Moultrie National Historical Park preserves Fort Sumter and Fort Moultrie, involved in battles including the Battle of Fort Sumter and the Battle of Sullivan's Island
- George Rogers Clark National Historical Park preserves the site of Fort Sackville, site of the Siege of Fort Sackville
- Harpers Ferry National Historical Park preserves Harpers Ferry, West Virginia, the site of John Brown's Raid on Harpers Ferry and the Battle of Harpers Ferry
- Jean Lafitte National Historical Park preserves the Chalmette Battlefield, site of the Battle of New Orleans
- Minute Man National Historical Park preserves sites related to the Battles of Lexington and Concord
- Nez Perce National Historical Park preserves sites of various battles of the Nez Perce War
- Palo Alto Battlefield National Historical Park preserves the site of the Battle of Palo Alto
- Pecos National Historical Park preserves the site of the Battle of Glorieta Pass
- Saratoga National Historical Park preserves the site of the Battles of Saratoga
- Sitka National Historical Park preserves the site of the Battle of Sitka
- War in the Pacific National Historical Park preserves sites related to the Battle of Guam (1944)

=== National Historic Sites ===
- Fallen Timbers Battlefield and Fort Miamis National Historic Site preserves the site of the Battle of Fallen Timbers
- Fort Bowie National Historic Site preserves the site of the Battle of Apache Pass
- Ninety Six National Historic Site preserves the site of Siege of Savage's Old Fields and Siege of Ninety Six
- Sand Creek Massacre National Historic Site preserves the site of the Sand Creek Massacre
- Springfield Armory National Historic Site preserves the site of Shays' Rebellion
- Washita Battlefield National Historic Site preserves the site of the Battle of Washita River

=== National Seashore ===
- Gulf Islands National Seashore includes Fort Pickens and the site of the Battle of Santa Rosa Island

== Affiliated areas ==
The following are affiliated areas of the National Park Services that are battlegrounds

- Eutaw Springs Battlefield preserves the site of the Battle of Eutaw Springs
- Kettle Creek Battlefield preserves the site of the Battle of Kettle Creek
- Parkers Crossroads Battlefield preserves the site of the Battle of Parker's Cross Roads

== See also ==
- National Historical Park
- List of areas in the United States National Park System
