= First Battle of the Stronghold =

Part of the Modoc War of 1872–1873

Coordinates: 41.90932°N 121.53305°W

- Part of Modoc War (Indian Wars)
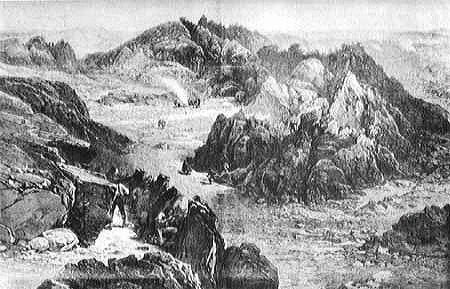
- Modocs defending Stronghold
Date	January 17, 1873
Location	South shore of Tulelake; Northeastern California, United States
Result	Decisive Modoc victory

Belligerents
Modoc	United States

Commanders and leaders
Captain Jack; Shaknasty Jim; Scarface Charley	Frank Wheaton; John Green; Reuben Bernard

Strength
53	300 Infantry; 100 Cavalry; 2 howitzers

Casualties and losses
None	42 killed, many wounded

The First Battle of the Stronghold (January 17, 1873) was the second battle in the Modoc War of 1872–1873. The battle was fought between the United States Army under Lieutenant Colonel Frank Wheaton and a band of the Native American Modoc tribe from Oregon and California, led by Captain Jack (Kintpuash in Modoc).

The US Army forces tried to dislodge the Modoc from the natural fortress, now called Captain Jack's Stronghold, in the lava beds along the south shore of Tule Lake in northeastern California. They had illegally left the Klamath Reservation in Oregon, to which they had been relocated from their territory in order to enable European Americans to settle in the area. The Modoc soundly defeated the Army, inflicting numerous casualties and forcing it to retreat. Factors aiding the Modoc included their excellent defensive position, steady patience, and a thick fog that obscured portions of the battlefield.

== Background ==
Immediately after the inconclusive November 27, 1872 Battle of Lost River in Oregon, the Modoc escaped to the lava beds in what is now Lava Beds National Monument, California. Their band included women and children. There they joined a Modoc band led by Shacknasty Jim from Hot Creek, who had not been involved in the Lost River action. The Modoc were encamped at a natural fortress of caves and trenches 300 yards (270 m) wide and 2 miles (3.2 km) long in the lava beds, which they had improved to make more defensible. The Modoc had captured about 100 head of cattle which they relied on as a food supply.

The Army moved units from across the Department of the Columbia to the south end of Tule Lake, where the units established two encampments, the larger at Van Brimmer's Ranch, about 10 miles west of the Stronghold, and a smaller force at Louis Land's Ranch, 12 miles (19 km) to the east.

== Forces ==
=== Modoc ===
The Modoc bands numbered about 160 people, 53 of whom were warriors. The leaders of the group were Captain Jack, Shaknasty Jim, Scarfaced Charley, Hooker Jim, and John Schonchin.

=== United States ===
The US Army force in the field consisted of about 400 men. Lieutenant Colonel Frank Wheaton was in command, and had his headquarters at Van Brimmer's Ranch. Major John Green commanded the force in the west, and Captain Reuben Bernard was in command of the forces in the east.

The west force, under Major Green, consisted of the 21st Infantry under Major Edwin Mason; two companies of the Oregon militia under General John E. Ross; 1st Cavalry, Troop F, under Captain David Perry; a company of California volunteers under Captain John O. Fairchild, and one section of two 12-pounder (5 kg) mountain howitzers under 2nd Lieutenant W. H. Miller.

Captain Bernard's much smaller force consisted of 1st Cavalry, Troop B under Captain James Jackson and Troop G under 2nd Lieutenant John Kyle; and a company of Klamath scouts under Dave Hill.

== Preparation for attack ==
Colonel Wheaton planned a two-pronged attack. The main force in the west would launch the primary attack, with a secondary attack from the east to prevent the Modoc escaping. The two forces were to spread out and meet in the middle of the lava fields, south of the Stronghold, trapping the Modoc against Tule Lake. The howitzers were to provide support for the western attack. All men were to proceed on foot.

The units left their camps on January 16 to move into position. Major Green's units arrived at the southwest corner of Tule Lake at 1 pm; the artillery, which had traveled a longer, though flatter route, arrived after dark. Their camp was at the top of a bluff, overlooking the lava beds, about 3 miles west of the Stronghold.

Captain Bernard's group also advanced on the 16th, their objective being Hospital Rock, two miles east of the Stronghold. However, a thick fog obscured their view and the forces came within a mile of the Stronghold. At this point Bernard ordered a withdrawal, but the Modoc had already observed them and gave chase. They began firing on Bernard's left flank and pack train, before being run off. Three of Bernard's men were wounded in the exchange. Bernard's force withdrew to Hospital Rock, and prepared for the next day's battle.

== Battle ==
On the morning of January 17, the battlefield was covered with a thick fog and the weather was damp. In the west Major Green formed a skirmish line, with the 21st Infantry battalion and California volunteers on the left flank, next to the lake, and the Oregon militia on the right flank. He held a detachment of the 21st Infantry and 1st Cavalry, F Troop, in reserve to defend the howitzers. In the east, Bernard's force formed up with the Klamath Scouts and B Troop on the left flank, and G troop on the right flank, next to the lake.

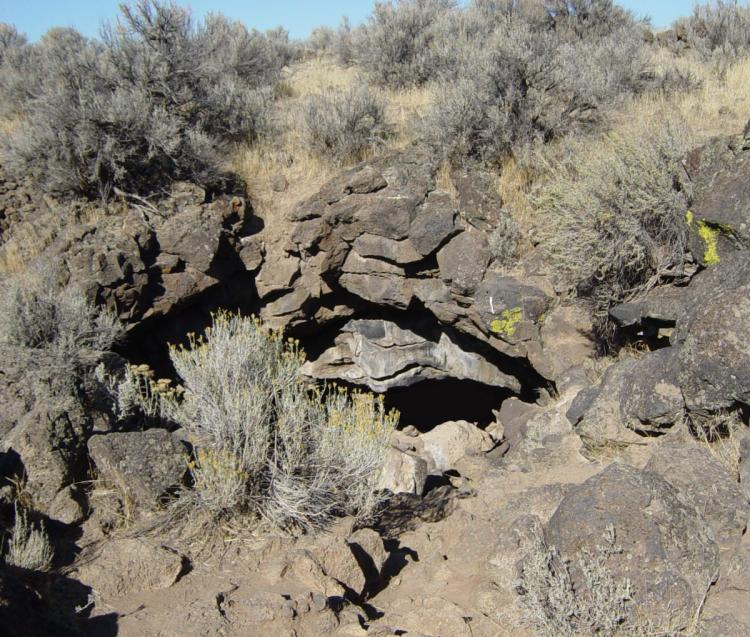
Captain Jack's cave at the Stronghold

The battle orders called for the howitzers to fire three shots as a signal for Bernard to begin the attack, then they were to pause for 15 minutes before resuming firing to give the Modoc a chance to move their women and children out of the Stronghold. However, due to the fog, the howitzer crews could not determine where their shots were landing, and they did not resume firing after the signal shots for fear of hitting their own forces.

Green's force advanced on the Stronghold, and after covering 1.5 miles (2.4 km), reformed with F Troop taking the extreme right flank, to attempt to join up with Bernard's force. At about this time the western force first began taking fire from the Modoc, who had left the Stronghold to attack the Army in the lava beds. Green's advance was slowed to almost nothing as the rough terrain and the enemy fire combined to make advance difficult. The Modoc, concealed by the fog and hiding in the rock formations, shot any target presented to them as they slowly gave ground, causing many casualties among the Army. At about 2 pm, Green's force came to a "very deep chasm", which stopped their advance.

In the east, after advancing to about 500 yards (460 m) from the Stronghold, Bernard's force also came under fire from the Modoc; they charged the enemy as the ground on the east was much easier than on the west. However, after advancing 100 yards (91 m), they encountered a deep gully which they determined to be impassable, and withdrew 150 yards (140 m). Here Bernard's force began building crude fortifications out of the available rock.

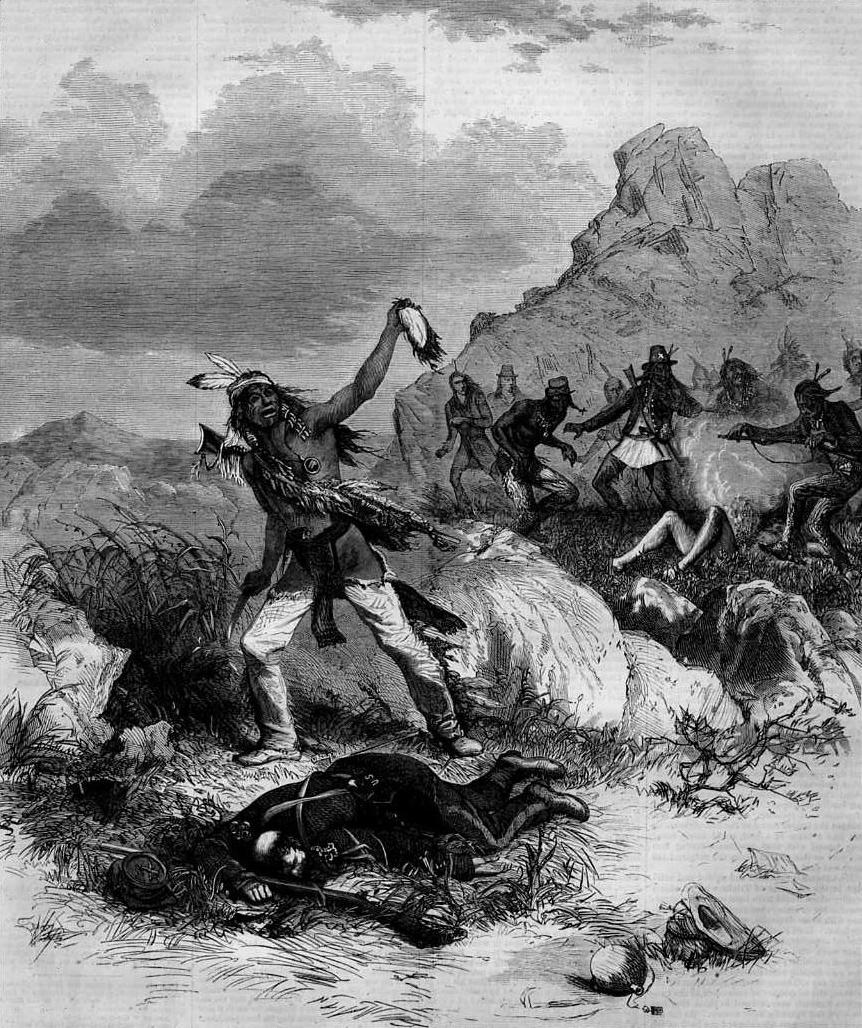
Modocs Scalping and Torturing Prisoners, an 1873 wood engraving

At this point, Colonel Wheaton abandoned the plan to join the two forces south of the Stronghold. Major Green suggested that they instead attempt to join the units along the lake shore, north of the Stronghold. Orders were shouted to Bernard, who accepted the change in plans. However, Bernard's force, behind their makeshift walls, were unwilling to renew the attack. The east force did maintain their position and drew the enemy's fire.

With the exception of the Oregon militia, who claimed to be stopped by a ravine, Green's force began to move to the north along the shore. The California volunteers, 21st Infantry, and F Troop advanced behind the Stronghold, and were within 50 yards (46 m) north of the Stronghold when they were pinned down on the shore by overwhelming Modoc fire. Major Green was wounded when he stood up and urged his men forward, an act for which he later received the Medal of Honor. F Troop and half the 21st Infantry eventually made it to Bernard's force, but the rest of the Infantry and the California volunteers were pinned down along the lake shore and were ordered to remain in place until dark. At 5 pm, Colonel Wheaton realized he had failed to capture the Stronghold, and signaled Green and Bernard to retreat. The forces withdrew to their camps, a process that was not completed until after nightfall on January 18. The US soldiers the Modoc had killed were left on the battlefield, which provided the Modoc with additional rifles and ammunition.

The US lost 37 men killed or wounded; the Modoc suffered no casualties. Given the fog and rock cover, no Army survivors reported having seen a Modoc during the battle. The Modoc's spiritual leader, Curley Headed Doctor, took credit for raising the fog through his rituals.

== Aftermath ==
The defeat of the Army at the First Battle of the Stronghold strengthened the Modoc position. The United States began peace negotiations from a position of weakness. The Modoc also gained confidence in their ability to defend their position against a superior force.

Lt. Col. Wheaton was relieved of command, and replaced by Col. Alvan Gillem, a veteran of the Seminole War. The US Army brought reinforcements to Tule Lake from San Francisco, Nevada, and Oregon. It recruited additional scouts from the Warm Springs Indian Reservation, while the Oregon militia and California volunteers left the field.

During the peace conferences that followed the battle, Major General Edward Canby, commanding officer of the Department of the Columbia, came to the lava beds to lead the peace effort. Mistakenly thinking that killing leaders would encourage the Army to leave the Modoc alone, on Good Friday, April 11, 1873, Captain Jack and some of his men ambushed and killed General Canby and Reverend Eleazer Thomas, and wounded two more. This act ended the peace talks. The Army initiated the Second Battle of the Stronghold starting April 15.
