= John Green (Medal of Honor) =

United States Army officer (1825–1908)

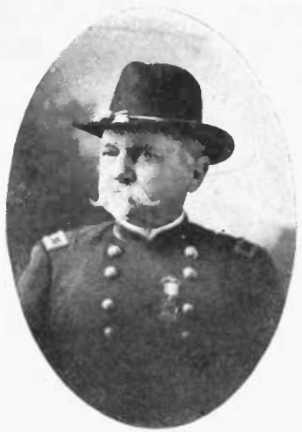
- John Green, Medal of Honor recipient
- Born: November 20, 1825; Kingdom of Württemberg
- Died: November 22, 1908 (aged 83); Boise, Idaho
- Burial place: Morris Hill Cemetery
- Military career
- Allegiance: United States of America
- Branch: United States Army
- Service years: 1846–1848, 1852–1889
- Rank: Lieutenant Colonel; Brevet Brigadier General
- Unit: Regiment of Mounted Riflemen
- Commands: 1st Cavalry Regiment
- Conflicts: Mexican–American War; American Civil War: Battle of Antietam; Battle of Gettysburg; Modoc War: First Battle of the Stronghold; Second Battle of the Stronghold
- Awards: Medal of Honor; National Association of Veterans of Mexican War Medal

John Green (November 20, 1825 – November 22, 1908) was a United States cavalry officer who received the Medal of Honor for his bravery and leadership at the First Battle of the Stronghold during the Modoc War.

== Early life ==
Green was born in the German territory of Württemberg in 1825, and in 1832 his parents brought the family of one girl and five boys to Crawford County, Ohio. Green helped his father on the family farm, and in winter months he attended school. At age 14 he was apprenticed to a carpenter in the county, but he returned home after one month. At age 16 he was sent to live with his brother in Columbus to learn cabinetmaking, but his apprenticeship ended after only two weeks. Green left home and found employment as a Columbus store clerk, a job that lasted four years. When a recruiter from the Mountain Rifle Regiment opened an office in Columbus in 1846, Green and a friend enlisted in the army. Green was promoted to sergeant at Newport, Kentucky, after one month of duty.

== Military career ==
Green entered the army July 1, 1846. He fought in the Mexican–American War under General Winfield Scott as a first sergeant of the U.S. Mounted Rifles. He was discharged in August 1848, but he re-enlisted with the same regiment in September 1852. By the time the American Civil War began, Green was a first lieutenant of the 2nd Dragoons. On August 13, 1861, he was promoted to captain and served with the same regiment throughout the war, though it was renamed the 2nd Cavalry Regiment. He received a brevet promotion to major for service at the Battle of Gettysburg and to lieutenant colonel for service during the war.

Green was promoted to major of the 1st Cavalry Regiment in June 1868, and fought against the Apaches in Arizona. He was in command at Fort Klamath, Oregon when the Modoc War began. He earned the Medal of Honor during the First Battle of the Stronghold though the U.S. forces were defeated. Colonel Alvan C. Gillem, commanding officer of the 1st Cavalry, assumed command of the expedition against the Modocs. Green commanded a battalion of cavalry and infantry under Gillem during the Second Battle of the Stronghold in which U.S. forces succeeded in capturing Captain Jack's Stronghold. Green retired in 1889 after serving as commander of Fort Boise and alternately as commander of Fort Walla Walla. He received a brevet promotion to brigadier general in 1890.

=== Earning the Medal of Honor ===
At the First Battle of the Stronghold during the Modoc War Green's men displayed a reluctance to fight Modoc warriors, who had been inflicting casualties on their unit. Green left cover, and, standing in full view of the Modoc warriors, proceeded to pace in front of his men, slapping his gloves in his palm for emphasis. Although exposed to enemy fire, Green survived, although he was injured, and remained in command.

==== Medal of Honor citation ====
Rank and Organization: Major, 1st U.S. Cavalry. Place and Date: At the Lava Beds, Calif., January 17, 1873. Entered Service At: Ohio. Birth: Germany. Date of Issue: November 18, 1897.

In order to reassure his command, this officer, in the most fearless manner and exposed to very great danger, walked in front of the line; the command, thus encouraged, advanced over the lava upon the Indians who were concealed among the rocks.

== See also ==
- List of Medal of Honor recipients
- List of Medal of Honor recipients for the Indian Wars
- John Green Mausoleum
