= Second Battle of the Stronghold =

Part of the Modoc War of 1872–1873

Coordinates: 41.8246°N 121.5003°W

- Part of Modoc War (Indian Wars)
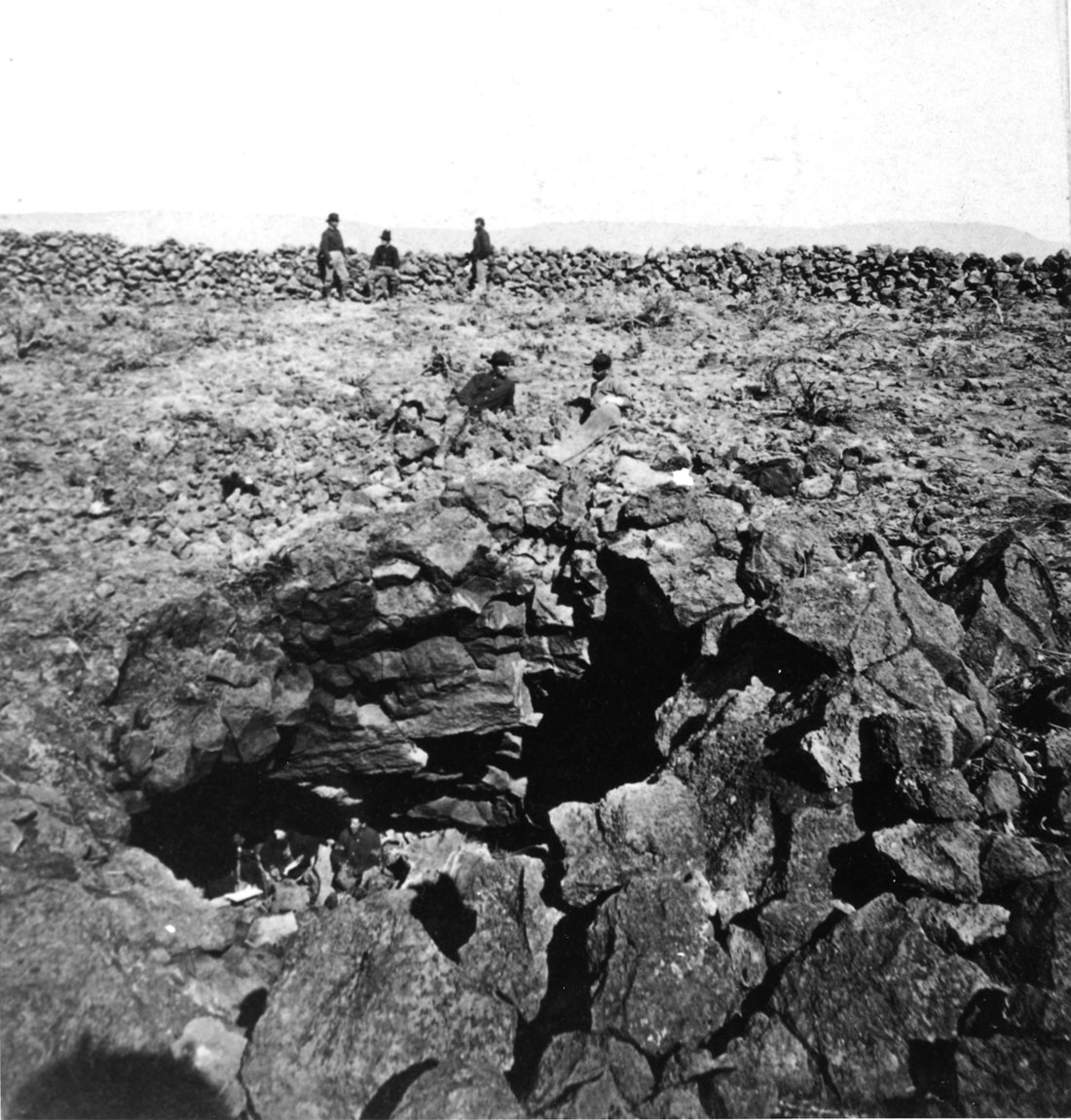
- Captain Jack's cave in the Lava Beds
Date	April 15 – April 17, 1873
Location	Captain Jack's Stronghold, California
Result	U.S. victory

Belligerents
Modoc	United States

Commanders and leaders
Captain Jack; Scarface Charley; John Schonchin	Alvan Gillem

Strength
53	675

Casualties and losses
3 men killed 8 women killed	7 killed, 13 wounded

The Second Battle of the Stronghold (a.k.a. Lava Beds) was a battle during the Modoc War between a band of the Native American Modoc tribe and the Army of the United States, in northeastern California. The battle began on April 15, 1873, and ended on April 17, 1873. The Army succeeded in forcing the Modoc to abandon their fortified position at Captain Jack's Stronghold in the Lava Beds, but failed to capture the band.

== Background ==
Following the assassination of Major General Edward Canby and another member of a peace delegation during a peace conference on April 11, 1873, the Army, under the command of Colonel Alvan Gillem, made preparations to attack the Stronghold.

== Fighting ==
On April 15 a general attack began, troops advancing from Gillem's camp on the west and Mason's camp at Hospital Rock, northeast of the Stronghold. Fighting continued throughout the day, the troops remaining in position during the night. Each advance of troops on the 16th was under heavy fire from the Modoc positions. That night the troops succeeded in cutting the Modoc off from their water supply at the shore of Tule Lake. By the morning of April 17 everything was in readiness for the final attack on the Stronghold. When the order was given to advance, the troops charged into the Stronghold.

After the fighting along the shoreline of Tule Lake on the afternoon and night of April 16, the Modocs defending the Stronghold realized that their water supply had been cut off by the troops commanding the shoreline. On April 17, before the troops had received the order to charge the Stronghold, the Modoc escaped through a crevice left unguarded during a movement of troops from one position to another.

== Casualties ==
During the fighting at the Stronghold, April 15–17, casualties included one officer and six enlisted men killed, and thirteen enlisted men wounded. The only Modoc casualty was a boy, reported to have been killed when a cannonball, which he was attempting to open with an axe, exploded. Several Modoc women were reported to have died from sickness.

== Order of battle ==
=== U.S. ===
Col. Alvan C. Gillem, 1st U.S. Cavalry commanding

Mason's Command - Major Edwin C. Mason

- 1st U.S. Cavalry
  - Troop B
  - Troop C
- 21st U.S. Infantry
  - Company B
  - Company C
  - Company I
- 4th U.S. Artillery
  - Howitzer Battery
- Scouts
  - Warm Springs

Green's Command - Major John Green

- 1st U.S. Cavalry
  - Troop F
  - Troop K
  - Troop H (remained behind as rear guard)
- 12th U.S. Infantry
  - Company E
  - Company G
- 4th U.S. Infantry
  - Battery A
  - Battery E
  - Battery K
  - Battery M

=== Modoc ===
Modoc bands of Captain Jack, Scarface Charley and John Schonchin

== See also ==
- Indigenous peoples of California
- Lava Beds National Monument
