= Canby's Cross =

Historic site in California, United States

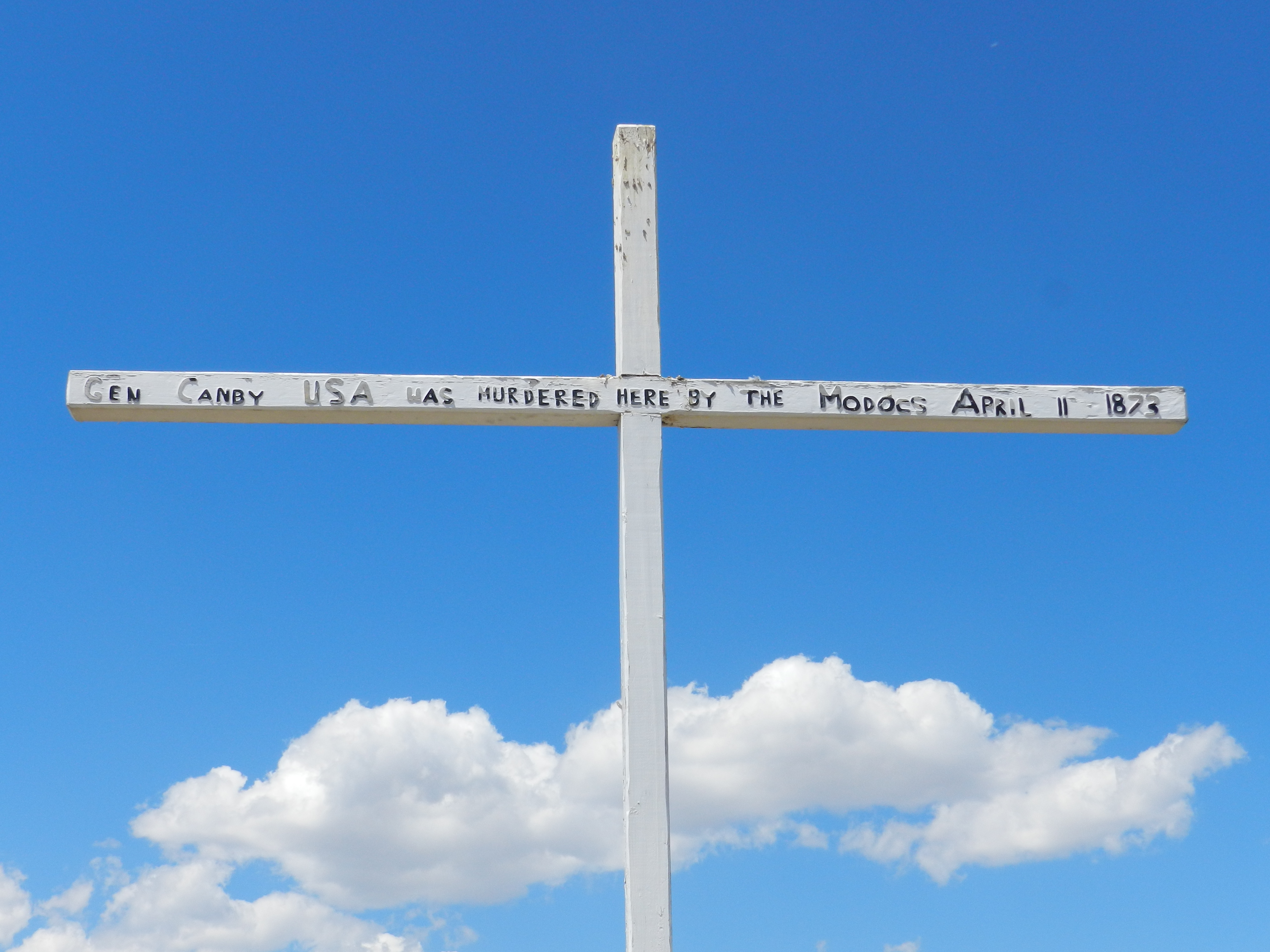
- Reproduction of Canby's Cross located in Lava Beds National Monument. The writing on the cross reads, "Gen Canby USA was murdered here by the Modocs April 11, 1873"
- Location: Lava Beds National Monument
- Coordinates: 41.818767°N 121.543604°W

California Historical Landmark
- Reference no.: 110

Canby's Cross is located in Lava Beds National Monument, about 3 miles south of Tule Lake, and 5 miles south-southwest of the town of Tulelake, California. It was erected to commemorate General Canby's death at a peace gathering. General Canby was shot in the face by Captain Jack of the Modoc tribe, who was later hanged for the killing. The cross is registered as a California Historical Landmark.

The cross reads: Gen Canby USA was murdered here by the Modocs April 11, 1873.

The elevation of Canby's Cross is 4058 ft (1237 m).

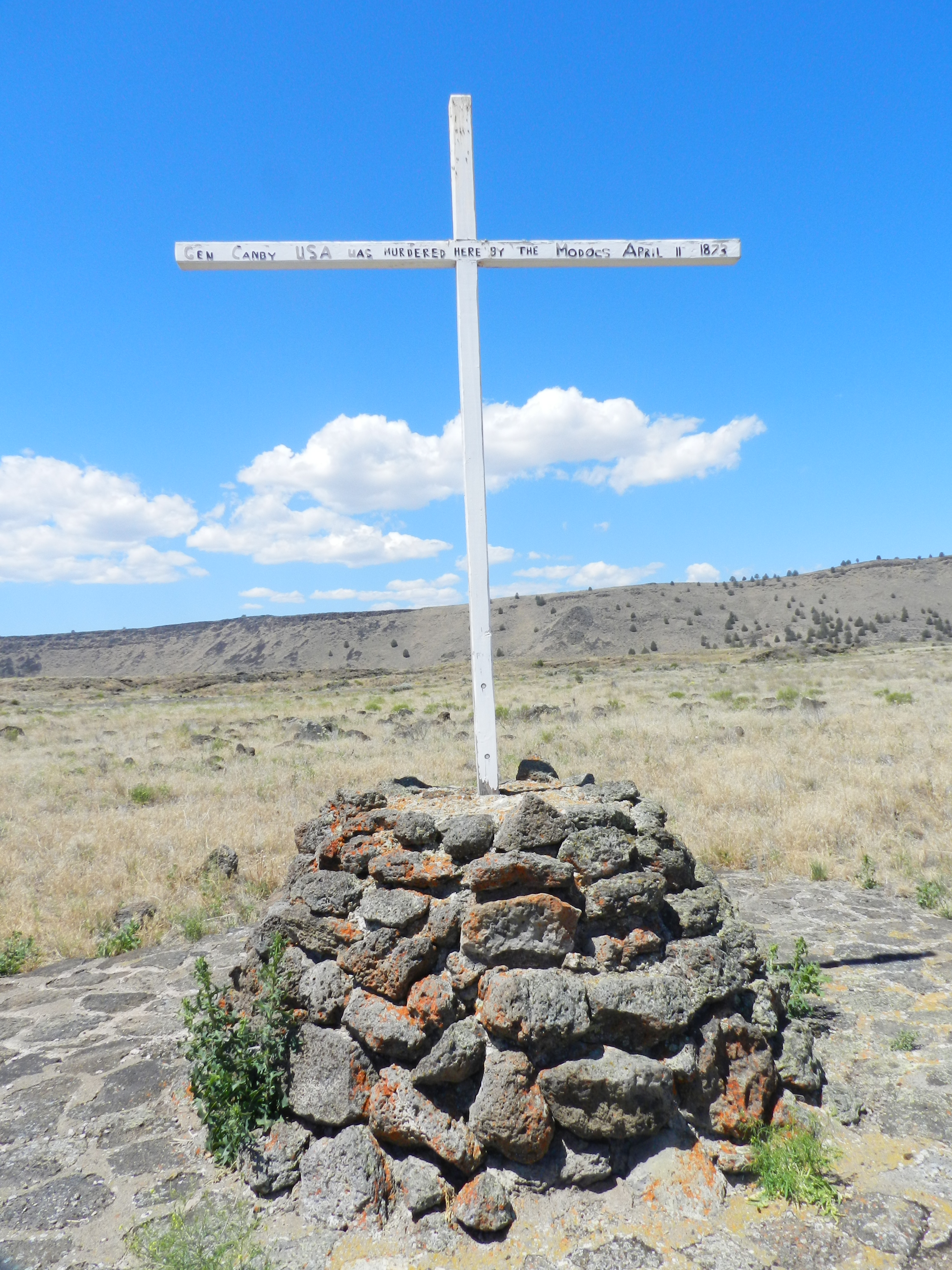
Canby's Cross, with stone foundation
