= Shacknasty Jim =

Modoc warrior and the leader of the Hot Creek band

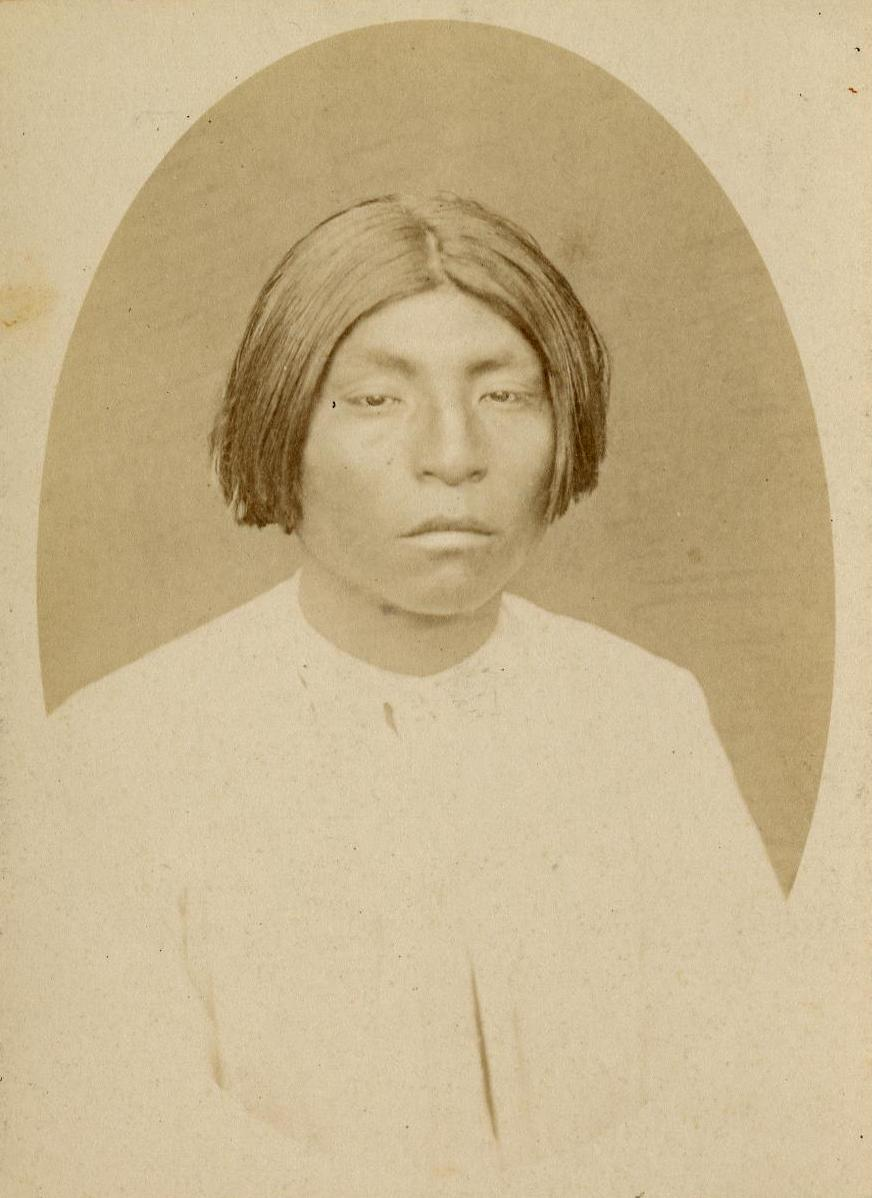

Shacknasty Jim (c. 1851 – 1881) was a Modoc warrior and the leader of the Hot Creek band. His nickname is a corruption of a Modoc name (Shkeitko or Shok-Nos-Ta) meaning Left-handed Man. His brothers, Jake and Shacknasty Frank, fought under him during the Modoc War. After the plot to assassinate the peace commissioners was carried out, Shacknasty surrendered, and his band went onto the Quapaw Agency Lands. Shacknasty then served as a scout who helped the United States Cavalry hunt down the remaining Modoc warriors.

Shacknasty Jim died of tuberculosis at the Quapaw Indian Agency.

His great-granddaughter is the author Cheewa James.
