= Captain Jack's Stronghold =

Archaeological site in California, United States

- U.S. National Register of Historic Places
- U.S. Historic district
- California Historical Landmark
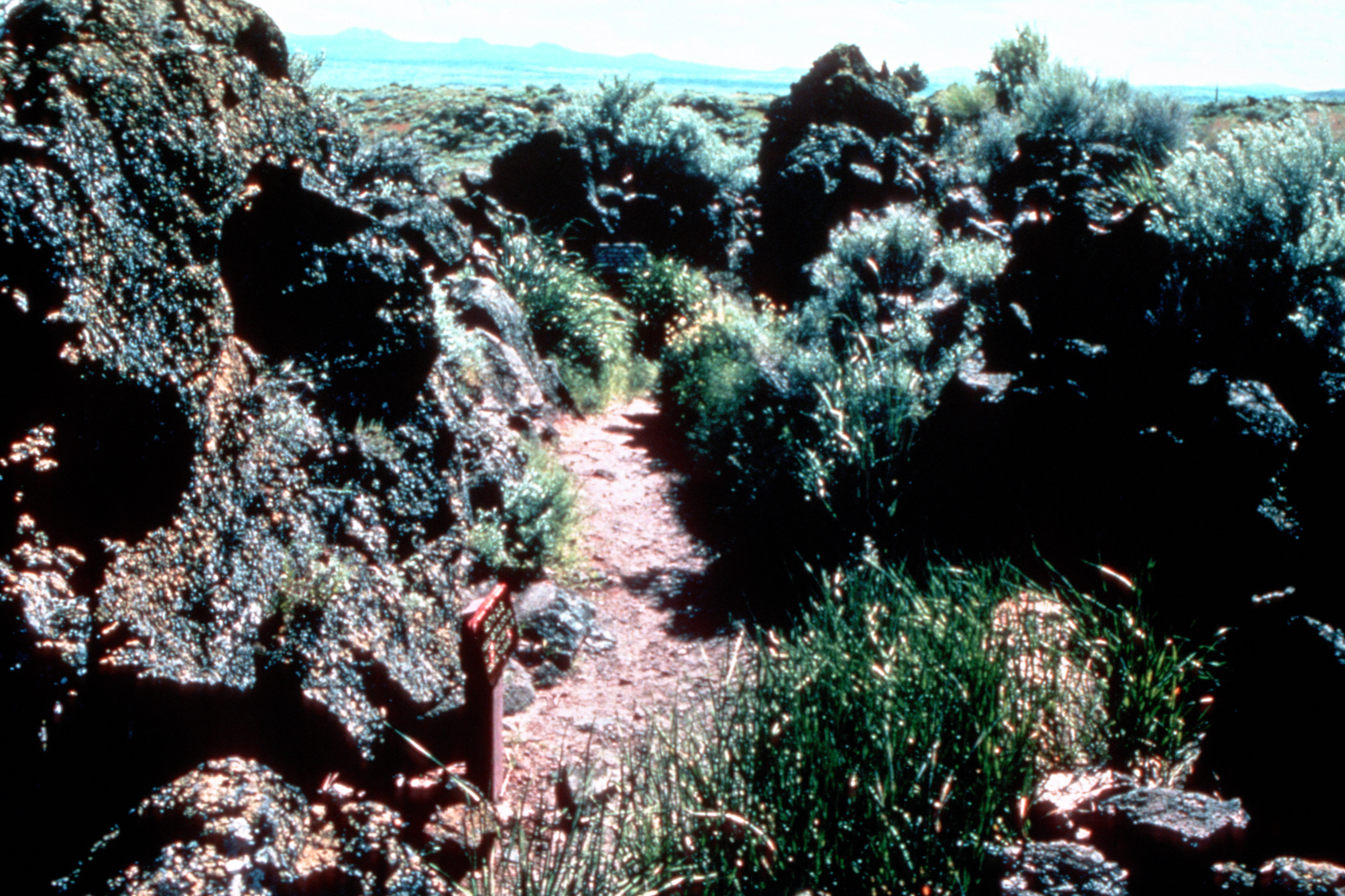
- Captain Jack's Stronghold

- Location within California Location within the United States
- Nearest city: Tulelake, California
- Coordinates: 41°49′18″N 121°30′18″W
- Area: 460 acres (190 ha)
- Built: 1873
- NRHP reference No.: 73000259
- CHISL No.: 9

Significant dates
- Added to NRHP: September 20, 1973
- Designated CHISL: June 1, 1932

Captain Jack's Stronghold was a holdout of the Modoc people that is located between Tulelake and Canby, California. The stronghold, which is now part of Lava Beds National Monument, is named for Native American chief Kintpuash who was also known as Captain Jack. During the Modoc War in 1873, Captain Jack along with 53 Modoc warriors, and numerous women and children in a band of 160, managed to hold out against the United States Army which outnumbered them by as much as 10 to 1 for several months.

The Modoc retreated to this area because it was part of their traditional territory where they had hunted and lived before the start of the California genocide, when agents of the United States government assisted by private citizens began the systematic killing of thousands of indigenous peoples of California in the mid-19th century. Many of the brutal acts carried out against native populations were encouraged, tolerated, and perpetuated by state authorities and militias.

== History ==
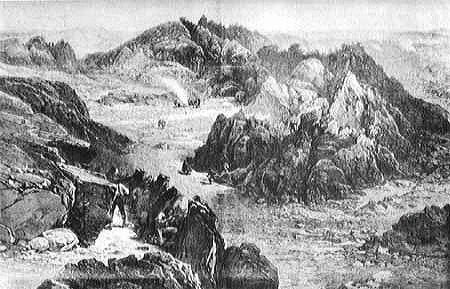
Modoc warriors defending the Stronghold

After the Battle of Lost River in November 1872, Captain Jack's band settled into the area around stronghold for several months. The Modoc used the lava beds as a defensive stronghold because of the rough terrain, rocks that could be used in fortification, and irregular pathways to evade pursuers.

On January 17, 1873, a combined U.S. Army command of 225 soldiers supported by 104 Oregon and California volunteers were defeated by 51 Modoc warriors at the First Battle of the Stronghold. A total of 35 Whites were killed and many wounded while the Modoc suffered no deaths or serious injuries. The Second Battle of the Stronghold took place on April 15–17. After getting additional reinforcements, the US force captured the stronghold's spring as well as cutting off access to Tule Lake. The attack resulted in the death of one officer and six enlisted men while thirteen soldiers were wounded. Reportedly the only Modoc casualty was a boy who was killed when a cannonball he tried to open with an axe, exploded and several Modoc women who died from sickness.

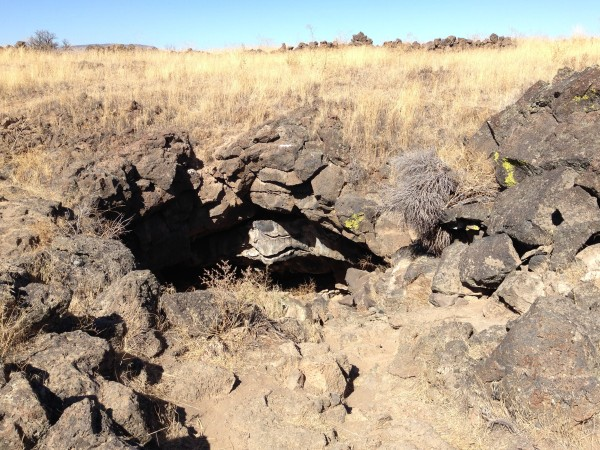
Captain Jack's Cave at the Stronghold

After being cut off from their only water sources, the Modoc escaped on April 17. They used a crevice that had been left unguarded while US troops were moved from one position to another in preparation for the final assault on the stronghold. Over the next few weeks, most of the band were caught. The last group, which was made up of Captain Jack, John Schonchin, Black Jim, and Boston Charley, were finally captured on June 1, 1873. After being convicted of murdering General Edward Canby and Reverend Eleazer Thomas at a peace parley in April 1873, Captain Jack and the three others were hanged on October 3, 1873, at Fort Klamath. Canby would be the only US general to be killed in the Indian Wars.

== Historic site ==
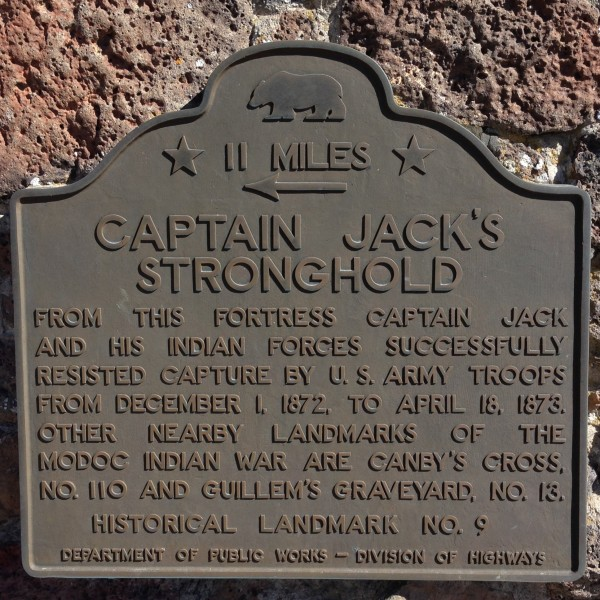

On June 1, 1932, Captain Jack's Stronghold was designated "California Historical Landmark #9".
