= Scarface Charley =

Chief of the Modoc tribe in California

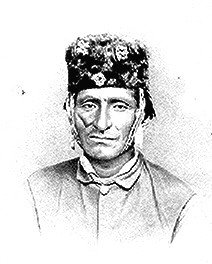
- Born: circa 1851
- Died: December 3, 1896; Quapaw Reservation, Ottawa County, Oklahoma

Chikchikam Lupatkue-latko (c. 1851 – December 3, 1896), known as Scarface Charley, was a chief of the Modoc tribe of Native Americans.

== Biography ==
He took part in the Modoc War of 1872–1873 in California, and is considered to have fired the first shot at the Battle of Lost River. On April 26, 1873, Scarfaced Charley led a victorious attack against a patrol of 63 soldiers. He killed all five of the officers in the patrol, as well as twenty others. It is widely written that he stopped the slaughter and told the soldiers, "We've killed enough of you, now go home."

After the execution of Kintpuash and three of his warriors for the murder of Major General Edward Canby and Rev. Eleazar Thomas, Scarface Charley was appointed by Colonel Frank Wheaton as chief of the Modocs who were to be sent to Oklahoma. After a year in Oklahoma, Scarfaced Charley was replaced by Indian Agent Hiram Jones, as chief by Bogus Charley, partly due to the latter's better understanding of English. Other accounts hold that he was removed because he refused to accept that white people were "true rulers".

Scarfaced Charley was also a gifted craftsman, designing an elegant typeface for the phonetic transcription of the Modoc language. He also developed a line of traditionally influenced domestic furniture, which was an important source of revenue for him after his political career was ended.
