= Tule Lake =

Seasonal lake in California and Oregon, USA

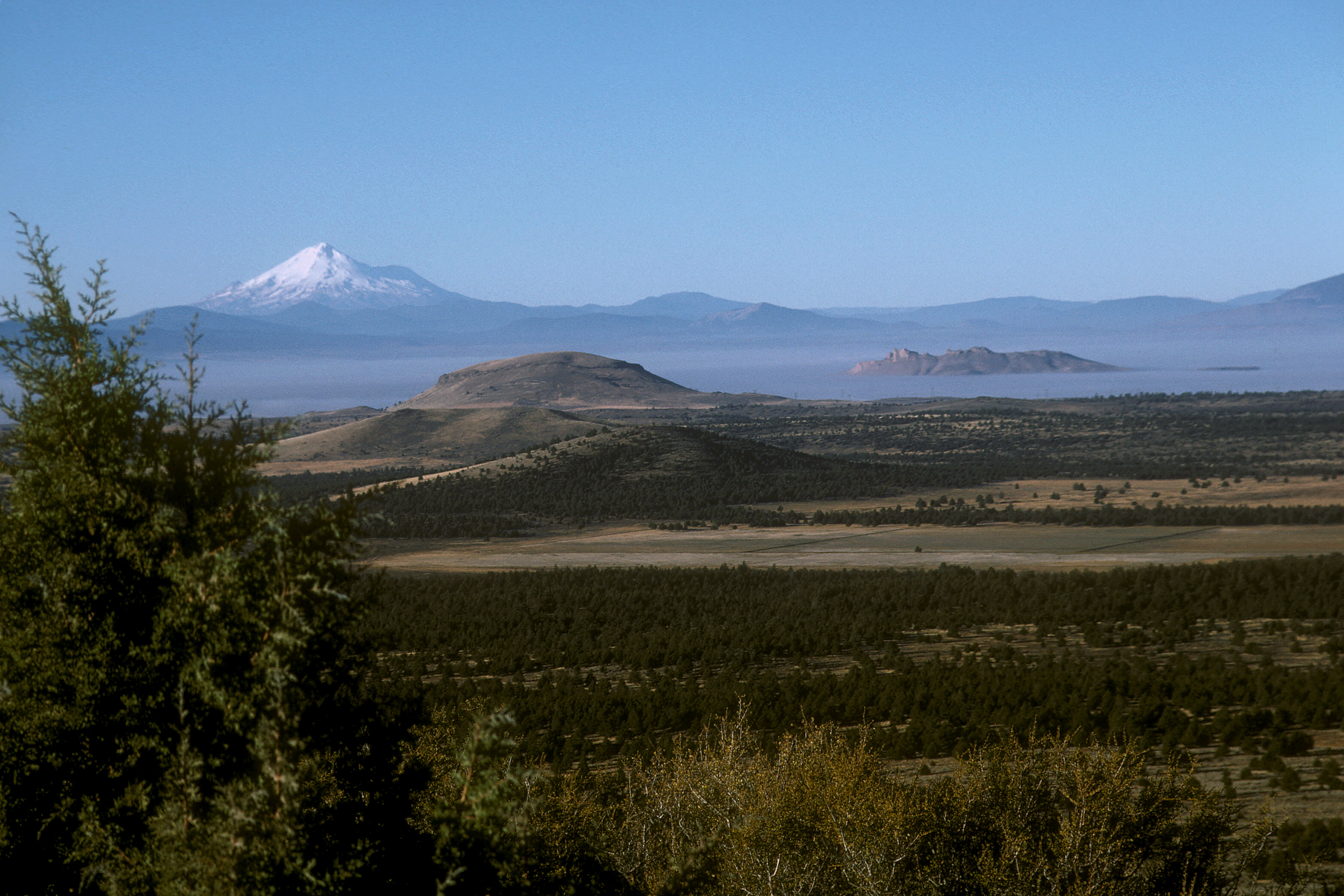
- Elevated view of the Tule Lake Basin, with snow-capped Mount Shasta looming in the background

- Location within California Location within the United States
- Location: Siskiyou / Modoc Counties, California, United States
- Coordinates: 41°54′34″N 121°31′59″W
- Type: Ancient lake, intermittent lake
- Primary inflows: Lost River
- Max. length: 8.0 km (5.0 mi)
- Max. width: 4.8 km (3.0 mi)
- Surface area: 13,000 acres (53 km^{2})
- Surface elevation: 4,035 ft (1,230 m)

Tule Lake (/ˈtuːliː/ TOO-lee) is an intermittent lake covering an area of 13,000 acres (20 sq mi) extending five miles (8 km) long and three miles (5 km) across, in northeastern Siskiyou County and northwestern Modoc County in California, along the border with Oregon.

== Geography ==
Tule Lake is fed by the Lost River. The elevation of the lake is 4,035 feet (1,230 m) above sea level.

It is one of twenty ancient lakes in the world that have existed continuously for more than 1 million years. However, this has recently come under significant threat due to multiple years of drought conditions.

Tule Lake is located 2.4 km (1.5 mi), southwest of the town of Tulelake in Northern California.

=== Wildlife and water ===
The lake is part of the Tule Lake National Wildlife Refuge and the Klamath Project. Deliveries of water from the Klamath Project have been necessary to provide sufficient water for wildlife. On July 24, 2020, a delivery of water from the Klamath Project saved 50,000 ducklings from death.

== History ==
Canby's Cross is located about 3 mi (4.8 km) south of the lake; it is the site where General Edward Canby was killed by the Modoc chief Kintpuash, also known to American settlers as Captain Jack.

The Tule Lake War Relocation Center, a Japanese American internment camp, is located east of the lake, in Modoc County. During World War II, the United States federal government under Executive Order 9066, forced the evacuation of Japanese nationals and Japanese Americans, including citizens born in the United States, to numerous camps built in the interior of California and inland states. This camp later housed mainly those who rebelled against War Relocation Authority (WRA) control in other Japanese Internment Camps, as well as those who refused to cooperate under what was known as the "loyalty questionnaire". They were forced to sell their businesses and homes, and suffered enormous economic and psychological losses by being treated as potential enemies. Following World War II, the federal government awarded 86 farm sites on land reclaimed by the drainage of Tule Lake to returning white veterans using a land lottery. A lottery was used because the number of applicants was greater than the number of homesteads available.

== See also ==
- Klamath Basin
- List of lakes in California
