= Schonchin Butte =

Cinder cone in the Cascade Range in northern California, United States

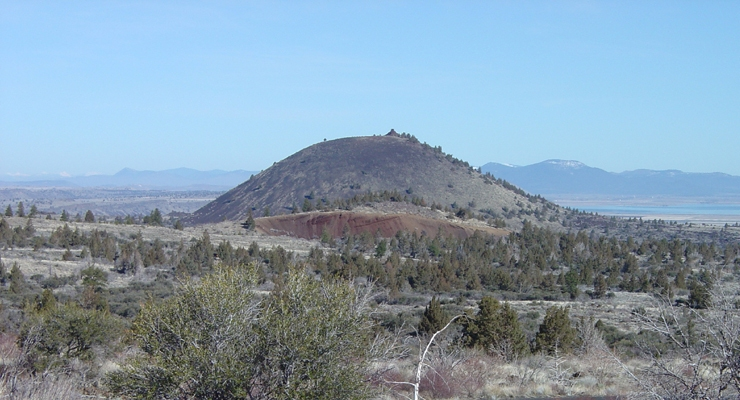
- Schonchin Butte from Cave Loop Road. Tule Lake is in the right background. The snowcapped peaks around Crater Lake are visible in the left background.

Highest point
- Elevation: 5,306 ft (1,617 m) NAVD 88
- Prominence: 582 ft (177 m)
- Coordinates: 41°44′17″N 121°31′45″W

Geography
- Location: Lava Beds National Monument, Siskiyou County, California
- Parent range: Cascade Range
- Topo map: USGS Schonchin Butte

Geology
- Rock age: more than 30,000 years
- Mountain type: Cinder cone
- Volcanic arc: Cascade Volcanic Arc

Climbing
- Easiest route: trail

Schonchin Butte is a cinder cone on the northern flank of Medicine Lake Volcano in the Cascade Range in northern California. Frothy lava, cooled in the air, created the large cinder cones throughout Lava Beds National Monument. It is named for Old Schonchin, a chief of the Modoc people during the late nineteenth century. Erupting more than 30,000 years ago, the volcano spewed ash and cinders into the air much like a can of soda when shaken. A lava spatter rampart is at the very top.

The butte's 0.75-mile-long (1.21 km) trail leads to a 360° view from the fire lookout. Views of the Medicine Lake Volcano, Mount Shasta, Mount McLoughlin, the Clear Lake Hills and the Warner Mountains can be seen. On a clear day, the south rim of Crater Lake in Oregon is visible.

== Fire lookout ==
- Schonchin Butte Fire Lookout
- U.S. National Register of Historic Places
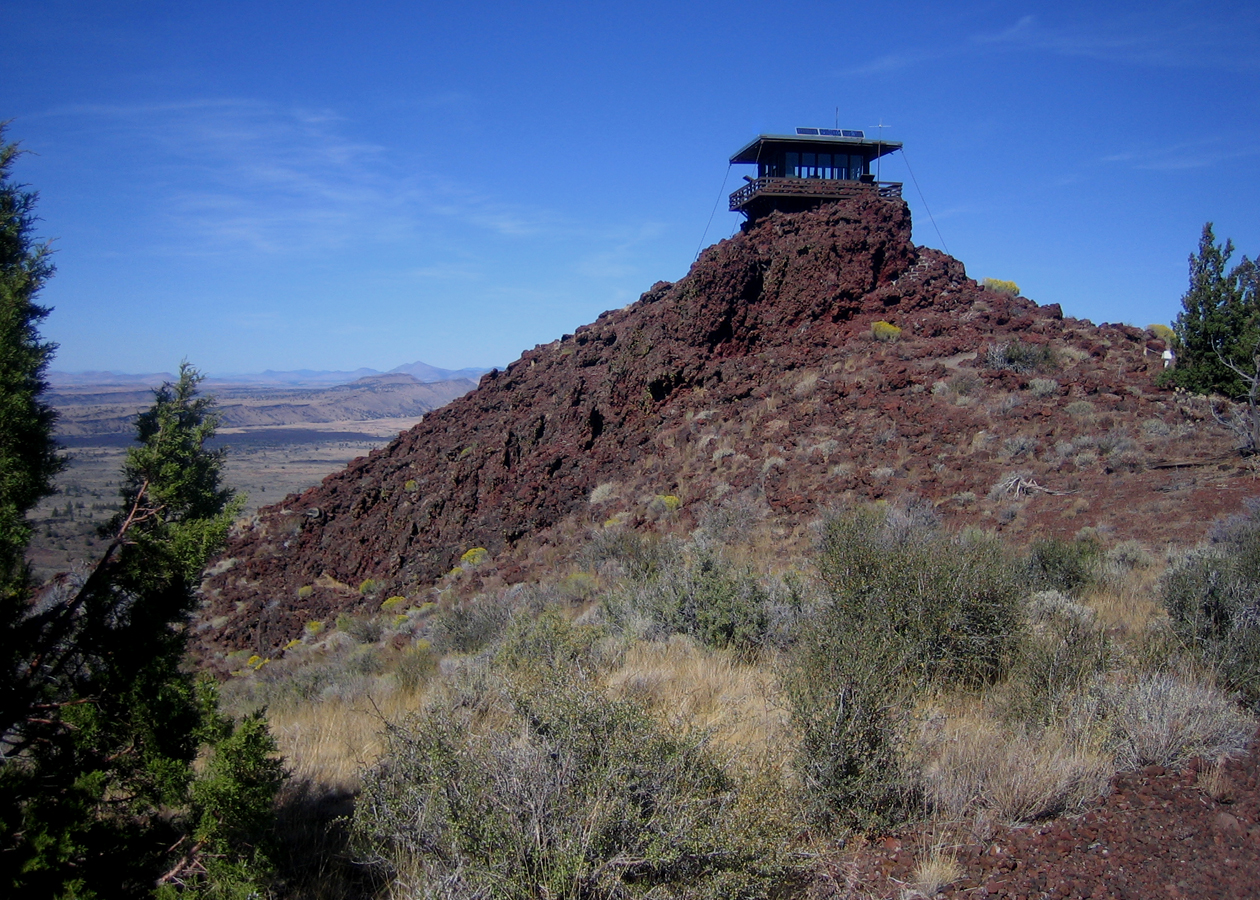

- Location within California
- Location: Lava Beds National Monument, near Tulelake, California
- Coordinates: 41°44′17″N 121°31′45″W
- Built: 1939-41
- Built by: Civilian Conservation Corps
- MPS: Historic Park Landscapes in National and State Parks MPS
- NRHP reference No.: 100001559
- Added to NRHP: September 5, 2017

The Schonchin Butte Fire Lookout is a fire lookout tower on Schonchin Butte, a cinder cone in Lava Beds National Monument.

The Civilian Conservation Corps built a fire lookout at Schonchin Butte during the summers of 1939 and 1940, as part of federal infrastructure development under the President Franklin D. Roosevelt administration during the Great Depression. The site was selected for its view of Lava Beds National Monument, while the United States Forest Service wanted a lookout constructed on Hippo Butte, probably because of its view of the Modoc National Forest. The CCC crew manually carried all materials to the building site after constructing the trail. Roger Reid was the first to staff the lookout in 1941. The 1942 date on the doorstep of the lookout represents when it was installed, not when the lookout was built, or first staffed.

The lookout has changed over the years, but its general appearance and structure have remained relatively unchanged. Linoleum, not carpet, used to cover the building's floor, and the furnishings were stained while trim was painted. Early lookouts used a radio phone, and a regular telephone was not installed for several decades. Many original items remain: the Osborne Fire Finder and its stand, the sink, and the insulated stool which lookouts use during thunderstorms.

Through the 1980s, rangers staffed the lookout for extended periods. They used gas for light and cooking, but electricity replaced gas in the 1950s when the National Park Service constructed a power line that ascended the cinder cone's east slope. The National Park Service removed the line in the mid-1980s when electric lines were buried along the Monument's main road. Solar panels now power a repeater, radio, and small lights.

Maintenance has been done piecemeal from the building's creation through the 1990s. By 1992, the building, placed on the National Register of Historic Places, showed signs of its age. In 1993, the Park Service received about $50,000 to restore the lookout. During June and July 1994, maintenance workers stripped the inside of paint and bad sheetrock. They removed old fixtures and a gas stove from the main level and various junk from the basement. The refrigerator was moved to the basement. Helicopters brought dirt and rock for the trail. Workers drained the cistern in the basement and installed new carpets and light fixtures capable of using electricity generated by solar panels.

Schonchin Butte is staffed approximately from May to September from about 10 A.M. to 6 P.M., but park rangers stay longer in cases of extreme fire danger, fire activity, or significant lightning activity. Lookouts no longer live in the building and carry up daily supplies on their backs. The lack of electricity and cooking equipment also limit a lookout's tour of duty.

Schonchin Butte appears as a topic in the American Park Network publication Oh, Ranger!. The chapter "The Lookout Tower" describes Schonchin Butte and chronicles two storms atop the lookout.

It was listed on the National Register of Historic Places in 2017.

The lookout and the trail leading up to it were built by the Civilian Conservation Corps during 1939 to 1941.

It is an active fire lookout tower, used during fire seasons.
