= Valentine Cave =

Cave in Lava Beds National Monument, California

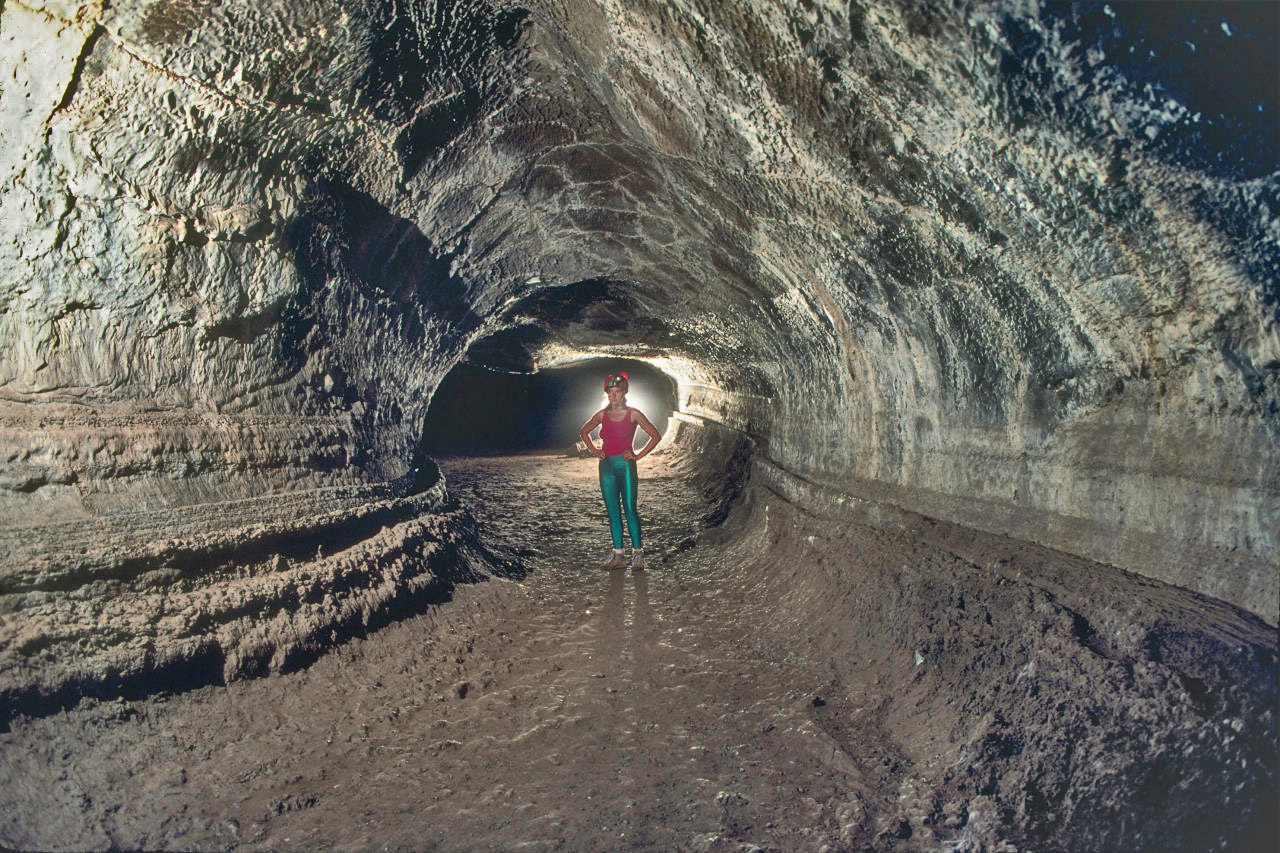
- Hiker in Valentine Cave

- Location within California
- Location: Lava Beds National Monument
- Coordinates: 41.70925°N 121.47778°W
- Length: 1,635 feet (498 m)
- Difficulty: Easy

Valentine Cave is a 1,635 foot (498 m) cave found in Lava Beds National Monument, California. It is considered one of the least challenging caves in the park.

== Discovery and name ==
The cave is one of the few in the park not named by J. D. Howard. It was discovered by Ross R. Musselman on Valentine's Day in 1933. He was led to the entrance after he noticed steam rising up from afar. As the discoverer, he was awarded naming rights. He named it after the day of discovery. Musselman later regretted his naming decision, wishing the cave bore his eponym instead.

== Description ==
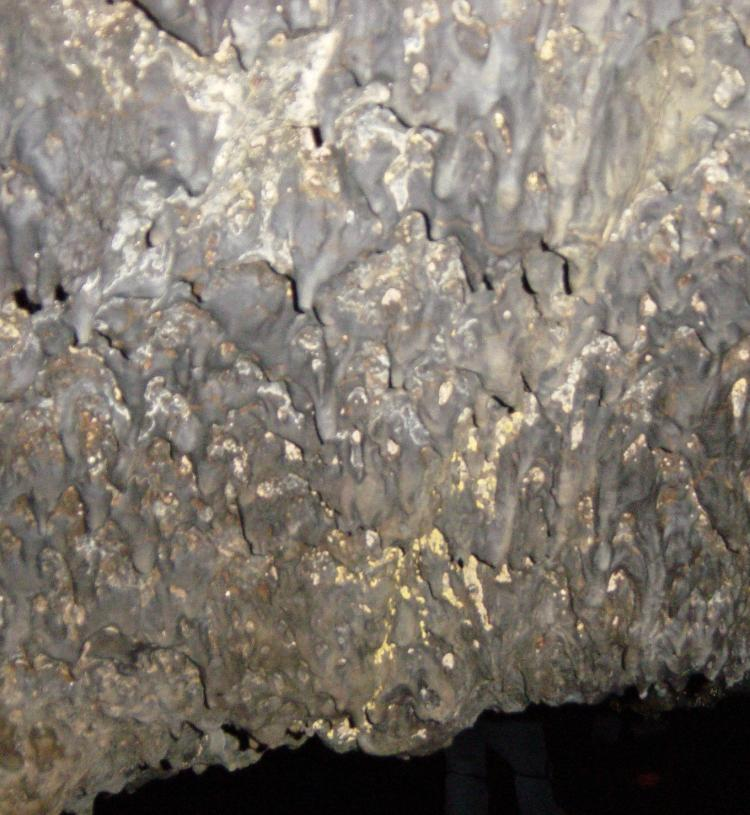
Lavacicles in Valentine Cave

Valentine Cave is approximately 11,000 years old with a roof 2 meters (6 ft 7 in) thick. It is considered a "warm cave", as interior temperatures remain around 50 °F (10 °C). On very cold days, such as on the day of its discovery, steam may rise from the entrance.

The accessible passages within the cave total 1,635 feet (498 m). Most of the accessible area is in one main tube, blocked 950 feet (290 m) downstream from the entrance by lava. The Valentine Cave entrance is a shallow collapse pit with an overhang upstream as well as downstream, but upstream access is blocked within 20 feet (6.1 m) by roof collapse.

The first 350 feet (110 m) of Valentine Cave is a good example of a lava tube that has almost completely drained. The lava remaining on the floor is mostly pahoehoe; in places it is glassy and lustrous whereas at the cascades it is frothy. Only a small amount of soil and a few scattered collapse blocks litter the tube floor. Rodent pellets are present at several places and, where rainwater seeping through the roof has moistened them, their phosphatic composition causes a green fluorescent glow when a flashlight is played on them.

The ceiling of this part of the cave contains excellent lavacicles, and the walls display fine examples of lava dripstone. Many lavacicles are short thick blades resembling shark teeth. The roof of the cave is also riven with innumerable tight cracks, mostly tensional, formed as the lava cooled and solidified. They meet in triple junctions (three cracks radiating from a point). In addition there are a few long, straight cracks parallel to the course of the tube. Percolating rainwater seeping through the roof along the cracks has loosened the lavacicle plaster from the wall rock above. A few large blocks of the roof have tumbled to the floor, and many others appear ready to fall.

Percolating water also produced another interesting effect on the roof. Water wets the surface along both large and small cracks and drips to the floor from their edges. Most of the water evaporates and forms a thin precipitate of white caliche (calcium carbonate). Because of the strong color contrast between the white caliche and the shiny black lavacicles, the roof of many parts of Valentine Cave appears to be a mosaic of irregularly shaped black tiles held together by a white cement.

=== Surface features ===
The size of the tube and its relation to surface features indicate that Valentine Cave continued much farther upstream and downstream. It can be traced upstream on the surface from a chain of collapse trenches, natural bridges, and short cave segments. The basalt of Valentine Cave erupted from a set of spatter vents outside the monument.

The topographical ridge that runs along the surface of Valentine Cave was the focus of a 2022 study. The reason of the study was to determine if surface features can give insight into the formation of lava tubes. It was determined that inflation of the tube through internal lava pressure may have caused the ridge.

== Human use ==
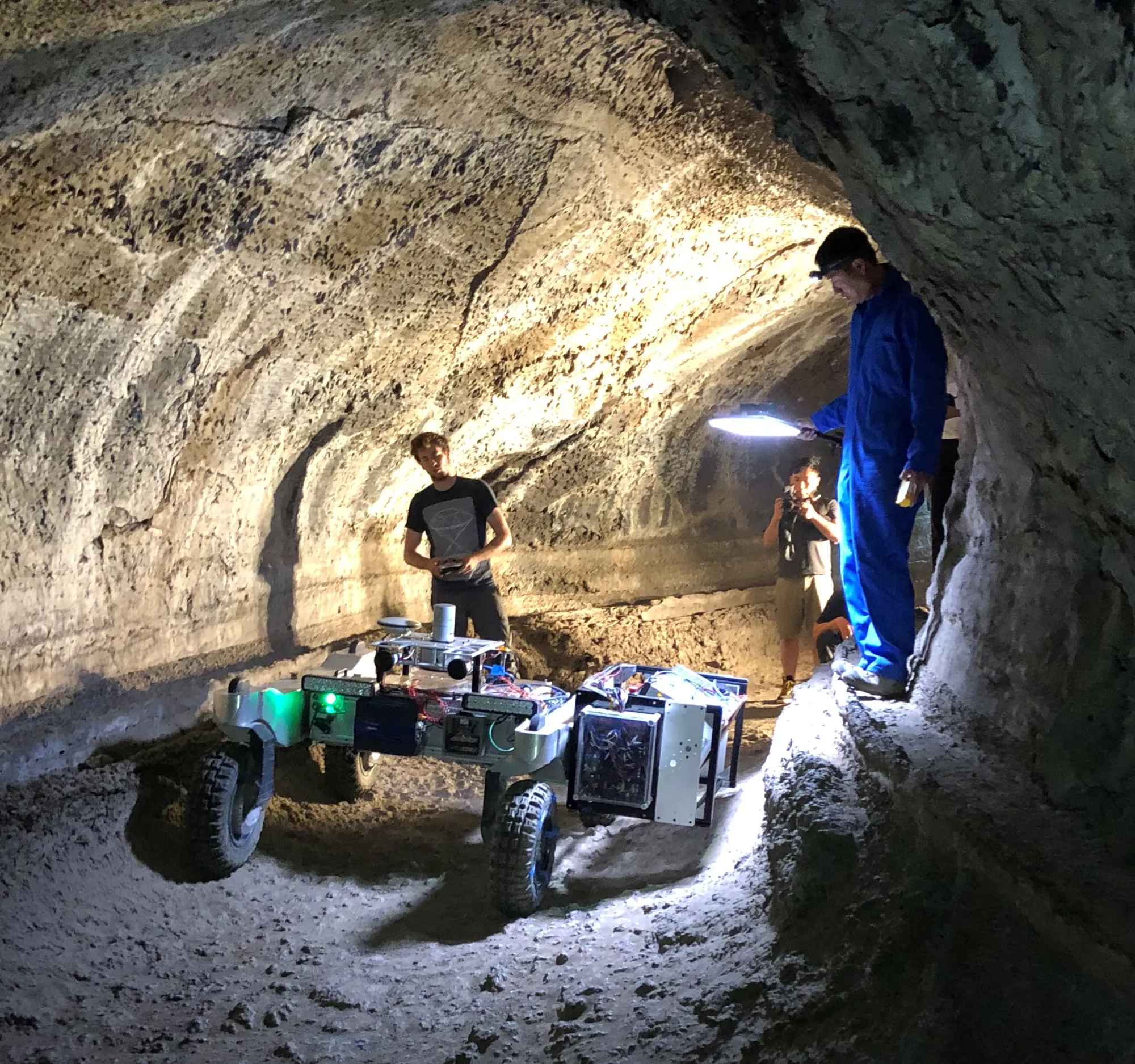
CaveR in Valentine Cave

Valentine Cave is one of the more popular lava tubes to visit in the park. It is easily accessible, and the passages are relatively tall and wide.

In 2019, NASA used the cave as a test for the CaveR rover deployed by the Biologic and Resource Analog Investigations in Low Light Environments project. The goal of the project was to develop the capability to detect life on the walls of volcanic caves from afar. The team's first descent occurred at Valentine Cave. Smooth walls around 15 feet (4.6 m) high and walkways up to 70 feet (21 m) wide made it a practical place to drive a rover, and its well preserved lava flow features are similar to what are expected inside a Martian lava cave.
