= Sáttítla Highlands National Monument =

Protected area in California

- IUCN category V (protected landscape/seascape)
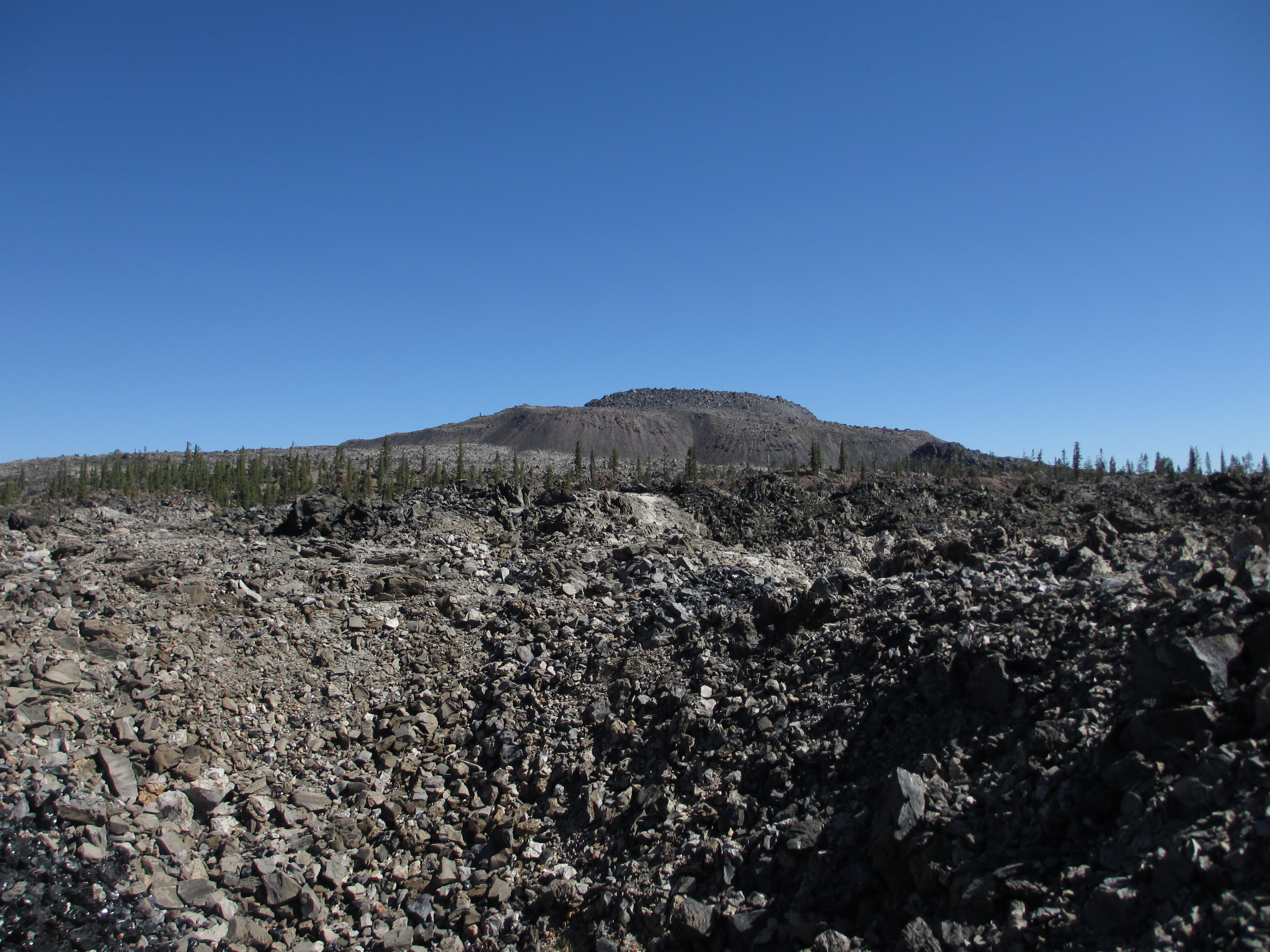
- Obsidian rocks on Glass Mountain
- Interactive map of Sáttítla Highlands National Monument
- Location: Siskiyou County, California, United States
- Coordinates: 41°30′N 121°30′W
- Area: 224,676 acres (909.23 km^{2})
- Established: January 14, 2025
- Governing body: United States Forest Service
- Website: https://www.fs.usda.gov/visit/national-monuments/sattitla-highlands-national-monument

Sáttítla Highlands National Monument is a national monument in the Medicine Lake Highlands of the Cascade Range of Northern California. The monument protects 224,676 acres (909.23 km^{2}) of forest and mountain habitat in Siskiyou County from development. The name Sáttítla means "obsidian place" in the Achomawi language.

In September 2024, Senator Alex Padilla introduced federal legislation to create the monument, with support from Senator Laphonza Butler. President Joe Biden established the monument by proclamation under the Antiquities Act on January 14, 2025.

== Features ==
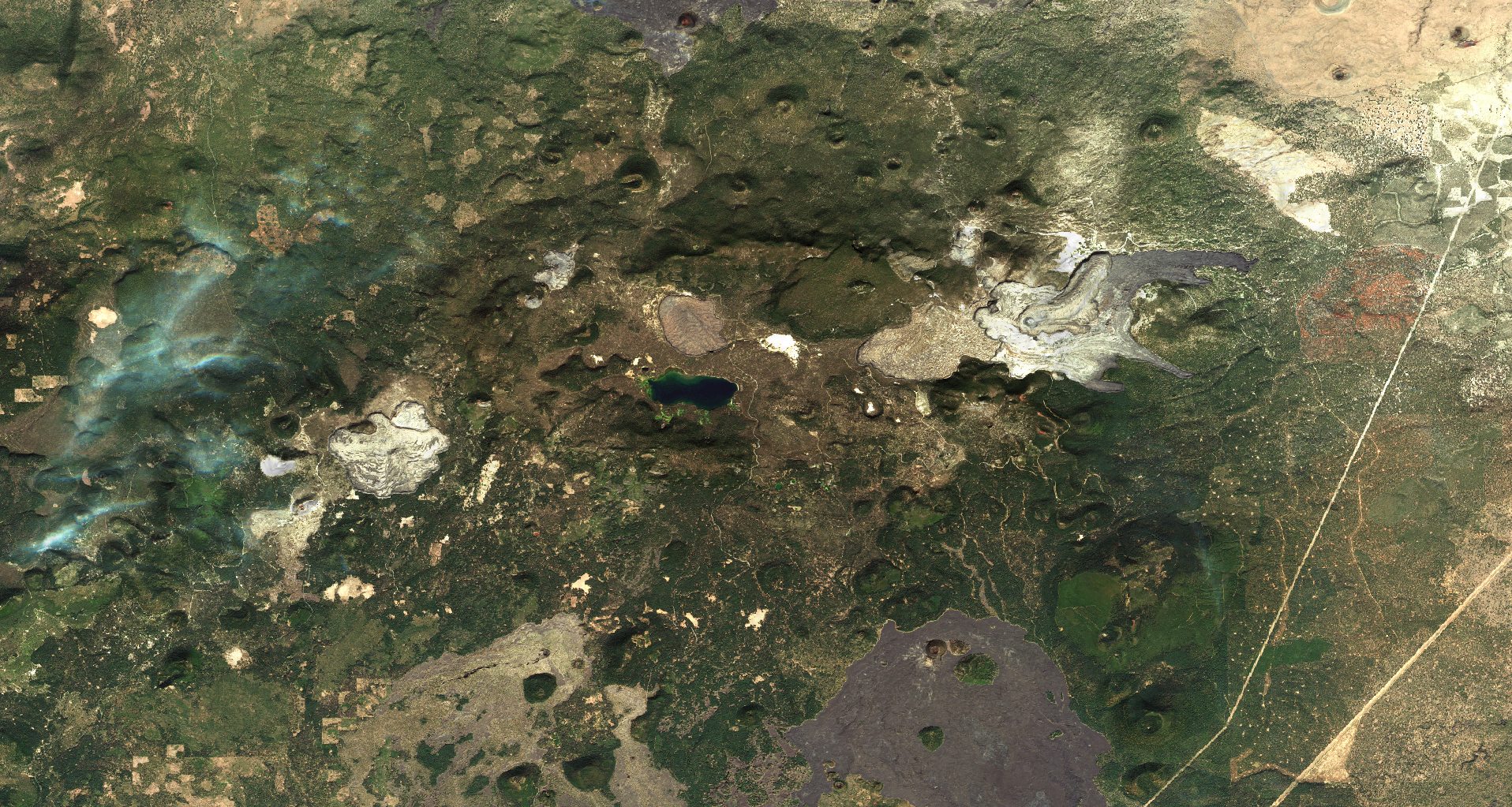
Satellite image of the monument, with Medicine Lake at center

The monument protects the Medicine Lake Volcano and surrounding highlands in Klamath National Forest, Shasta–Trinity National Forest, and Modoc National Forest northeast of Mount Shasta and south of Lava Beds National Monument. These highlands provide clean water for communities downstream through its extensive aquifers. The area includes numerous cinder cones and lava fields. The Giant Crater has the world's longest lava tube system.

The Volcanic Legacy Scenic Byway includes a segment that loops around Medicine Lake.

== Protection efforts ==
The Pit River Tribe has spearheaded calls for land protection. The tribe has opposed development of geothermal energy in the area.

The California legislature unanimously passed a resolution in support of the monument. The Forest Service hosted a public meeting about the proposed monument in December 2024.

On January 2, 2025, the Washington Post reported that President Biden would establish Sáttítla Highlands National Monument along with Chuckwalla National Monument. Biden planned to do so at an event in the Coachella Valley on January 7, but it was canceled due to a Santa Ana windstorm and rescheduled to be at the White House on January 14. The proclamation calls for co-stewardship and management of the monument with Tribal Nations.

On March 15, 2025, President Donald Trump signaled that he would rescinded the creation of the Sáttítla Highlands National Monument and Chuckwalla National Monument, saying that they "lock up vast amounts of land from economic development and energy production", but no executive order was released. There is no legal authority for undoing establishment of a national monument.

== See also ==
- List of national monuments of the United States
