= Lake Hills =

Lake Hills may refer to:

- Clear Lake Hills, a mountain range in Modoc County, California
- Emerald Lake Hills, California
- Fox Lake Hills, Illinois
- Lake Hills, a mountain range in Idaho
- Lake Hills Estates, California
- Lake Hills, Bellevue, a neighborhood in Bellevue, Washington
- Lake in the Hills, Illinois
- Lakehills, Texas
- West Lake Hills, Texas

== See also ==
- Lake Hill (disambiguation)
- Hill Lake
