= Merrill Cave =

Cave in Lava Beds National Monument, California

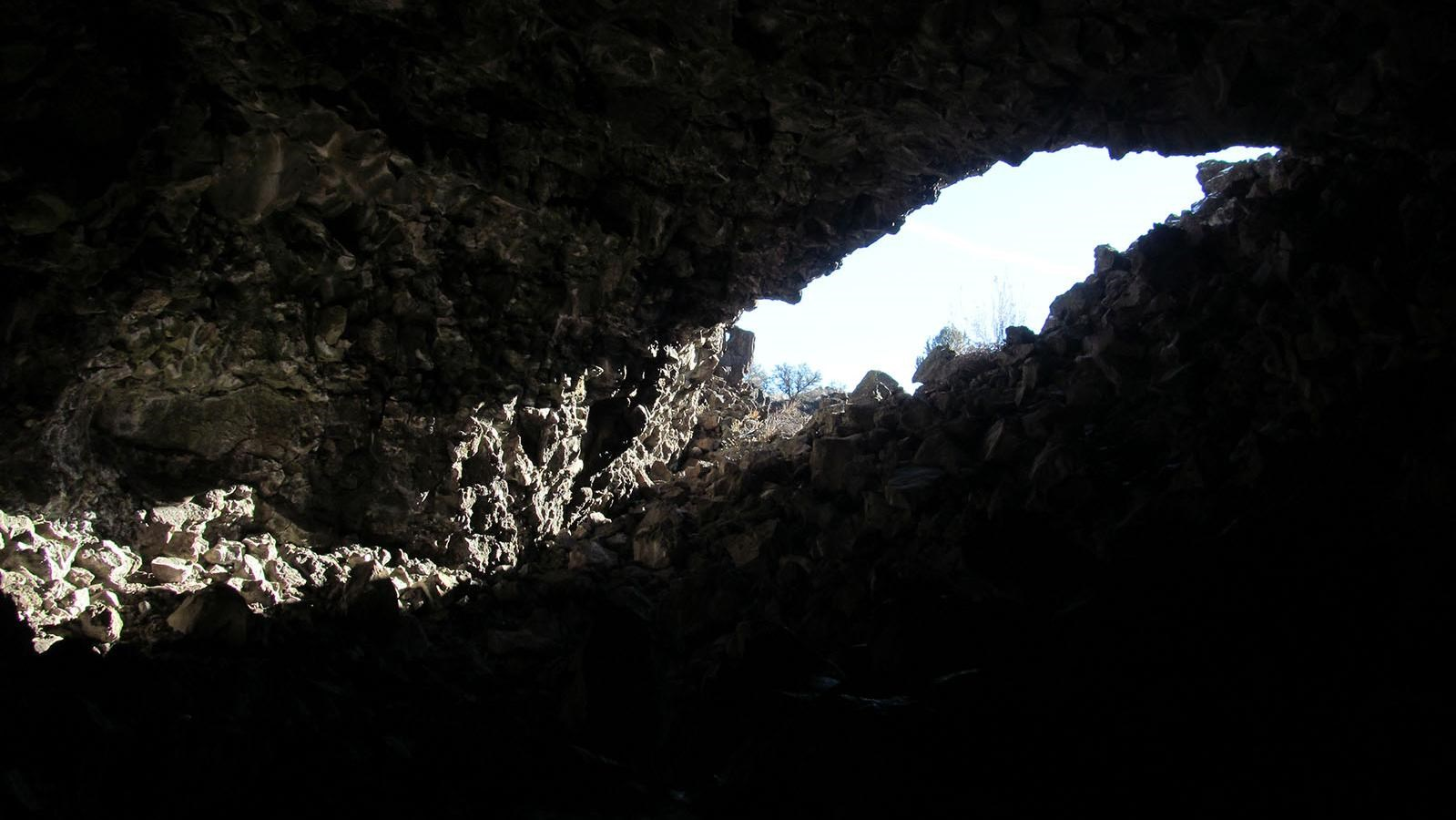
- View from inside Merrill Cave

- Location within California
- Location: Lava Beds National Monument
- Coordinates: 41.72872°N 121.54890°W
- Length: 650 foot (200 m)
- Difficulty: Easy

Merrill Cave is a 650 foot (200 m) former ice cave in Lava Beds National Monument in California. It was known for the pool of ice that was found year-round in the lower chamber of the cave, which fully disappeared due to compounding factors by 2005.

== History ==
The caves found here were created by flows of smooth lava 10,500 to 65,000 years ago. The cave was known Native Americans of the area, but was first recorded in 1888. It was named after the family of Charles H. Merrill, a homesteader whose land was donated to the National Park Service in 1938.

Historically, there has been a large perennial ice deposit at the bottom of the cave. The deposit has fluctuated in depth over the last several thousand years. Precipitation from above ground would collect in the lower chamber, and would freeze over the winter. In 1990, the NPS began monitoring the depth of the ice. Using historical photographs, it was known that ice levels had been growing for the preceding 40 years. In 1997, ice levels were first detected to be decreasing. By 2005, the ice had completely melted. Changing air flow patterns, seismic activity, tourism, and changing surface hydrology are possible factors for the loss of the ice.

== Description ==
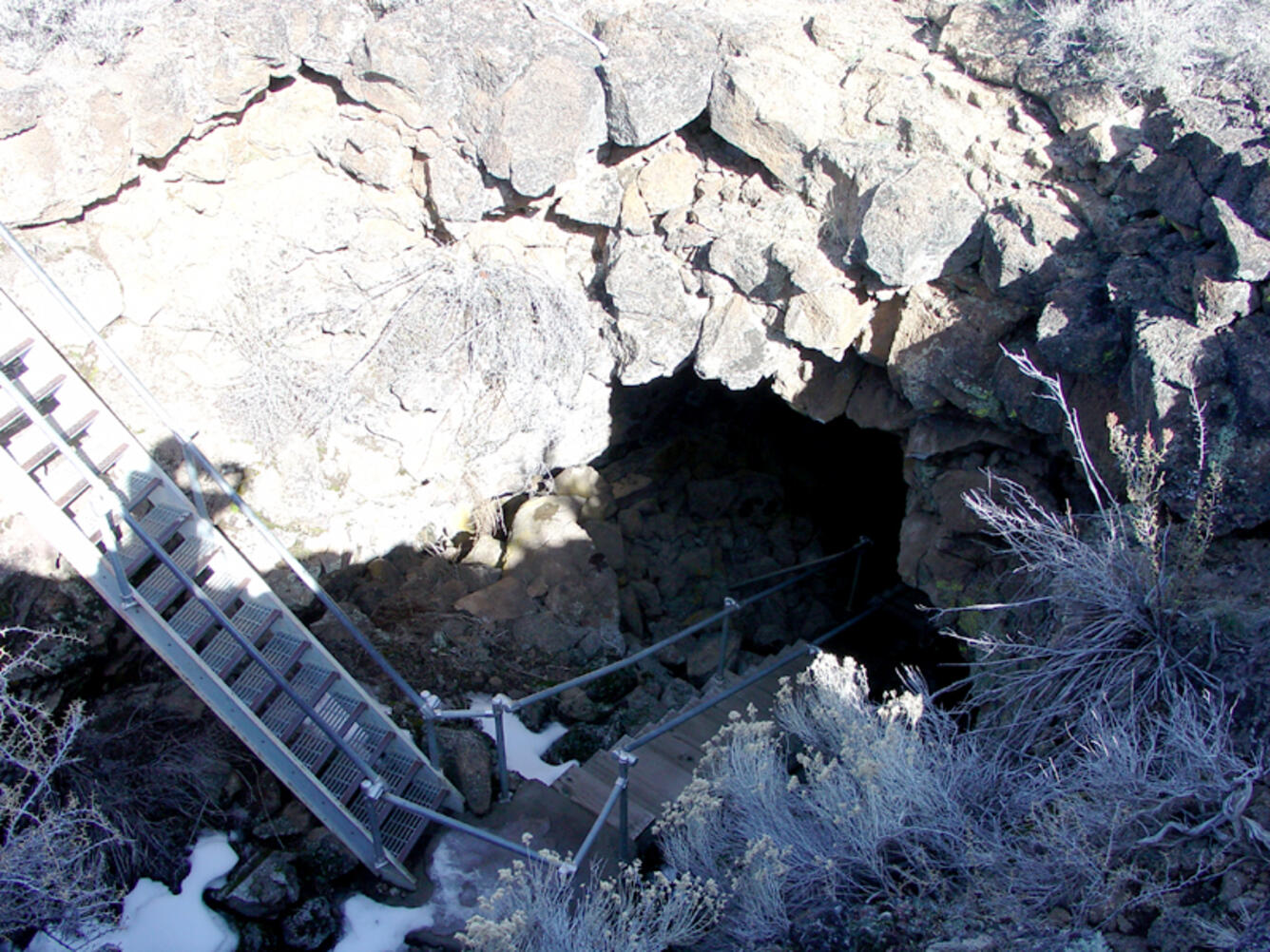
Staircase down to the entrance of Merrill Cave, 1990

Merrill Cave consists of two superposed lava tubes.

=== Upper level ===
From the north side of the parking lot a trail leads northeast 250 feet (76 m) to a stairway placed against the west wall of a 20 foot (6.1 m) diameter hole in the roof of a lava tube, which constitutes the entrance level of Merrill Cave. From the foot of the stair the tube extends upstream 85 feet (26 m) to where it opens into the north end of the collapse trench that lies just northeast of the parking lot. At the opposite upstream (southwest) end of the collapse trench is the natural bridge that supports the road to Merrill Cave.

Downstream from the base of the stairway, a trail and in some places a boardwalk provide easy access over the hummocky piles of collapse rubble littering the cave floor. A narrow bench on the southwest wall of the tube records shallow ponding of lava during a late episode of withdrawal. Some collapsed blocks appear to have been derived from tube-in-tubes, which may have only partly filled the main tube before their drainage and eventual collapse.

At a point 160 feet (49 m) downstream from the stairway, a 16 foot (4.9 m) ladder extends down through a small hole in the floor of the entrance level to the edge of an ice pond on the lower level. The entrance level extends downstream only another 40 feet (12 m) beyond the top of the ladder, and it is this short section that reveals much information about the origin of the entrance level. In this downstream section, the level is blocked by successive shells of lava accreted to the walls. Each shell is a record of one episode of filling and partial draining. Each molten flood deposited a layer of lava plaster upon the tube's walls, roof, and floor as its edges chilled against the colder rock encasing it; then, the still-molten lava beneath the thin coating drained away before completely solidifying.

At this downstream end the tube plunges and is constricted to a fraction of its upstream size. A smaller opening once drained lava from the entrance level to an underlying tube. Nevertheless, during each episode of maximum volcanic activity the tube would fill completely with lava, and as the eruption waned, the molten interior drained slowly through the opening and left a layer of lava plaster behind. Successive layers thus accreted until, as seen today, the opening is too small to crawl into. Since cessation of volcanism many of the accreted layers have loosened and partially peeled away from the roof and walls. Peeling layers are also well exposed at the upstream end of this level where the wall of the collapse trench slices across the lava tube to reveal telescoped shells of dripstone and lavacicles.

=== Lower level ===
The ice level of Merrill Cave is a 360 foot (110 m) long remnant of a medium-sized lava tube that is 15–20 feet (4.6–6.1 m) wide and originally was 12 feet (3.7 m) high. It is closed by roof collapse at both ends and its floor is completely obscured by collapse rubble and ice ponds. The roof and walls have been so greatly enlarged by slow unraveling of collapse blocks that few original features remain. Low benches are partially visible from beneath the collapse debris in the downstream part.

The most striking geologic feature in this level is a steep-walled depression in the floor 40 feet (12 m) upstream from the foot of the ladder. An ice pond 25 feet (7.6 m) in diameter once occupied the central part of this depression. Steep slopes of ice-encased collapse rubble rise on both ends of the former ice pond, and the upstream slope formed a frozen cascade. It seems that the pond marks the site where the floor of the ice level collapsed into a third, and probably larger, lava tube below. Moreover, it seems probable that this lower tube was filled with ice.

Three former ice pools occupy one-fourth of the floor space. One at the foot of the ladder and another near the upstream end of the ice level tube that extends 70 feet (21 m) and includes many "islands" are situated in low spots on the floor of the lava tube. The third pool is at a lower elevation and, as mentioned, filled a round hole that apparently connects the ice level with a lower ice-filled tube.

The ice in the shallow upstream pool was fairly transparent, and shadowy outlines of the blocks that project above the pool's surface could be traced to depths of a few feet below the surface. Much of the cave's ice, however, was murky with dust, small bubbles, cracks, and organic growth.

Thin rimes of hoarfrost form in parts of Merrill Cave during the winter months, and short, thin icicles develop for a brief period during the spring thaw; but these features come and go with the changing seasons. The formation of a water puddle in the late summer and autumn over the top of all three ice ponds was evidence of a greater seasonal exchange of warm air for cold air in the two levels of the cave.

== Recreation ==
Considered one of the "least challenging caves" to access in the park, visitors once ice skated by lantern light on an enormous ice floor at the bottom of this cave. The cave entrance is accessible by staircase.

The cave was closed to visitors between 1998 and 2003 for safety concerns. A catwalk was constructed over the ice in the 1930s by the Civilian Conservation Corps, but was removed in 2003 due to the receding ice. Walkways and a viewing platform remain accessible.
