= Mushpot Cave =

Cave in Lava Beds National Monument, California

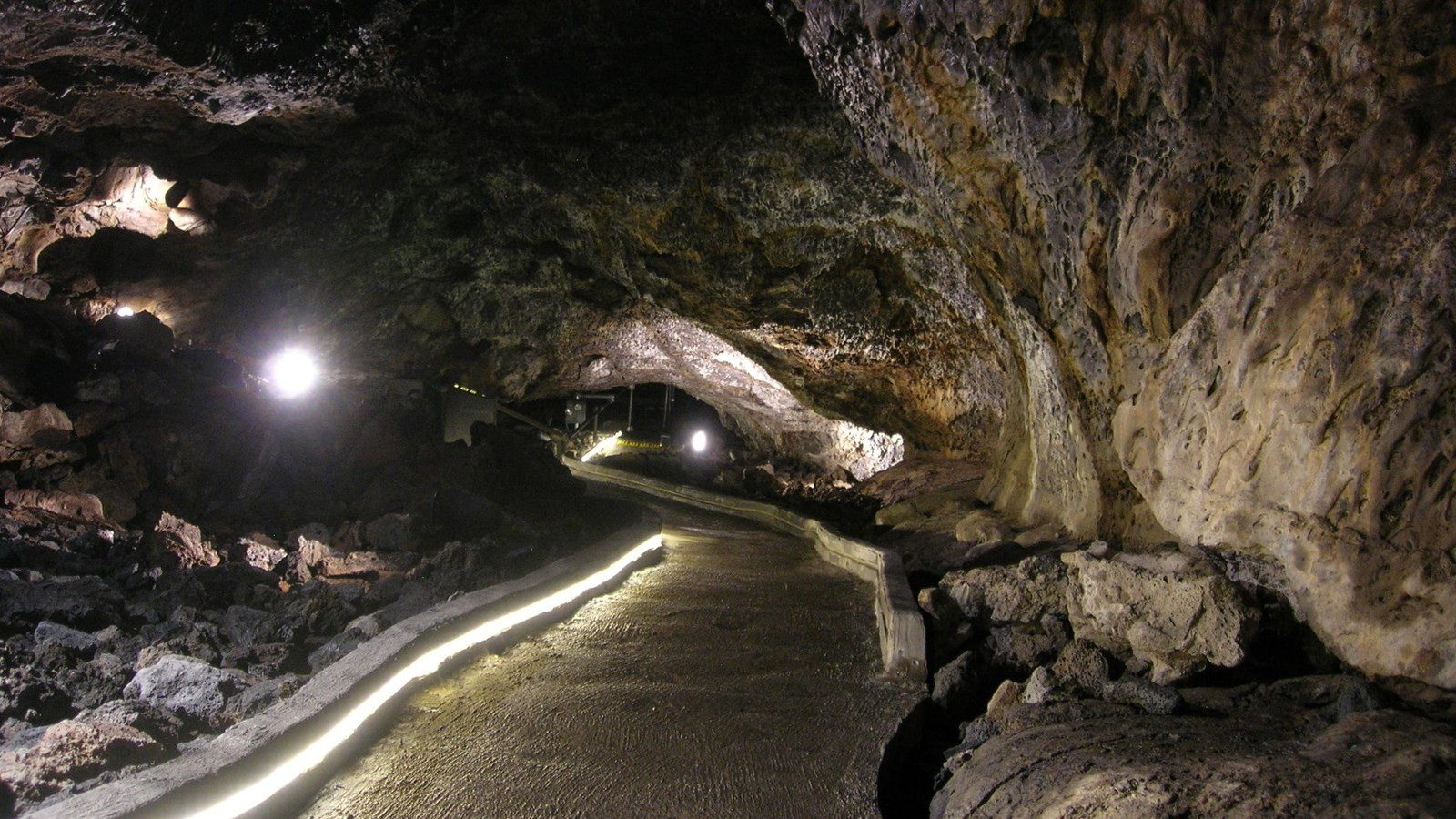
- Walkway in Mushpot Cave

- Location within California
- Location: Lava Beds National Monument
- Coordinates: 41.71363°N 121.50870°W
- Length: 770 foot (230 m)
- Difficulty: Easy

Mushpot Cave is a 770 foot (230 m) cave found in Lava Beds National Monument, California. It is one of the least challenging caves in the park and is recommended as an introductory cave for recreational caving. It is the only cave in the park to have lights and interpretive signs explaining the cave formations, ecology and cave climate.

== Description ==
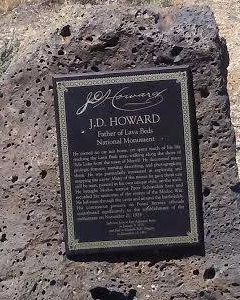
Plaque dedicated to J. D. Howard near the entrance to Mushpot Cave

The entrance to Mushpot Cave is a hole in its roof, located in the parking lot that serves the Visitor Center and Headquarters building. This is the only cave in the monument that contains lights and interpretive signs, which point out geologic features. It is an excellent place to get acquainted with lava tube caves. A staircase leads to the floor of the cave, and from this point one can traverse the main branch of Mushpot lava tube downstream (northeast) for 520 feet (160 m). Upstream the tube is blocked 25 feet (7.6 m) south of the foot of the stair by a floor jam of broken and deformed lava blocks.

Downstream 65 feet (20 m) from the entrance the main tube widens into a broad dome-like area and is intersected on its southeast wall by another wide tube, which diverted part of the flow in Mushpot tube to the east. Only about 50 feet (15 m) of the length of this east flowing tube is visible because both upstream and downstream it is filled to its roof with congealed lava. Yet another tube, a small tributary, spilled a thin flow of rough-surface pahoehoe into the main tube at a point low on the west wall 25 feet (7.6 m) downstream from the foot of the stairway. This small tributary is accessible only by crawling for 180 feet (55 m), where further access upstream is blocked by a lava lobe that leaves just a 6 inches (150 mm) space between floor and roof.

=== Entrance area ===
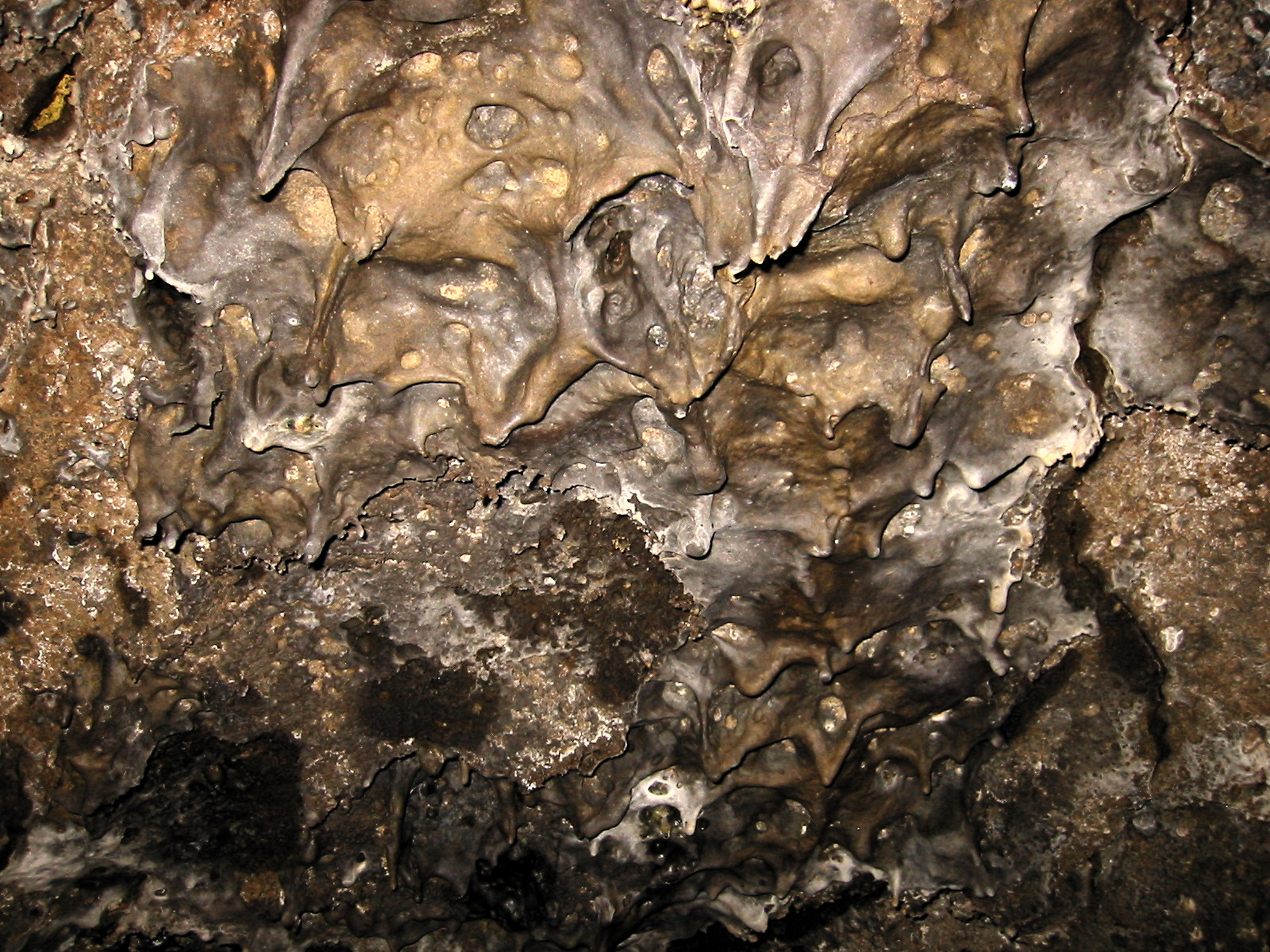
Lavacicles within Mushpot Cave

Upon entering Mushpot Cave, an open lava-tube cave extends downstream on the right and an alcove extends upstream on the left. The walls of this alcove are covered with lava dripstone—a thick plaster of sticky lava that oozed and dripped down the wall in thin lobes as the surface of molten lava lowered within the tube. Similar dripstone, somewhat obscured by lichens and dirt, extends to the top of the entrance pit on the east and south; the presence of this dripstone indicates that this entrance was a former skylight—a hole in the roof of the tube that was open to the sky while molten lava was in the tube.

Down the stairs is the feature that gives the cave its name—a small rounded mound of smooth lava with a hole in its top. Sticky lava emerged from this hole, spread radially, and built up a low cone. This is known as the Mushpot bubble.

South of the Mushpot bubble is the lava jam blocking the tube. Filling a 3 foot (0.91 m) space between floor and roof of the tube is a jumbled mass of frothy and distorted lava blocks—the crusted-over surface of a moving flow that broke and stuck, creating a constriction comparable to an ice jam in an Arctic river after the spring thaw. Note that the roof of the cave against which the lava has jammed is covered with lavacicles, some of which punctured the rising lava-jam blocks. These lavacicles embellish the roof of the cave not only here, but also above the Mushpot bubble and down the course of the Mushpot tube. The lava jam blocked the tube for only about 30 feet (9.1 m); the upstream area beyond this jam is in Lava Brook Cave.

=== High-lava marks ===
Another important feature well displayed in the area that contains Mushpot bubble is a high-lava mark, similar to that of a flood mark left by a river. One high-lava mark is present 20 inches (510 mm) above the floor on the east wall of the tube in the alcove containing the Mushpot bubble. It marks the maximum depth of lava before the jam blocked the tube. The mark is plastered across the dripstone wall of this alcove. One small patch of dripstone at the south end merges with the high-lava mark, and one small tongue of dripstone that slid off the side of the fallen block at the stairs is younger. These small patches of dripstone may be from lava that splashed up onto the wall by violent emission of gasses ("fountaining") of the flow that produced the high-lava mark.

The high-lava mark downstream because it is covered or removed in places by collapse or by human activities connected with trail construction. It slopes downstream, but at a lower gradient than the surface of the flow that now forms the floor of the tube. At the Mushpot the high-lava mark is 20 inches (510 mm) above the floor. Where the intersecting distributary tube takes off into the east wall 80 feet (24 m) farther downstream, the high-lava mark is 6 feet (1.8 m) above the floor and five other faint high-lava marks visible below it mark brief halts in the lowering of the lava flood. Three of the most conspicuous ones are present on the peninsula-like hump that flares out from the wall of the eastern distributary at the junction of the two tubes. To the north, the top one rises to the roof of the tube; the trace of this high-lava mark indicates that below this point the Mushpot tube was completely filled with lava.

== Recreation ==
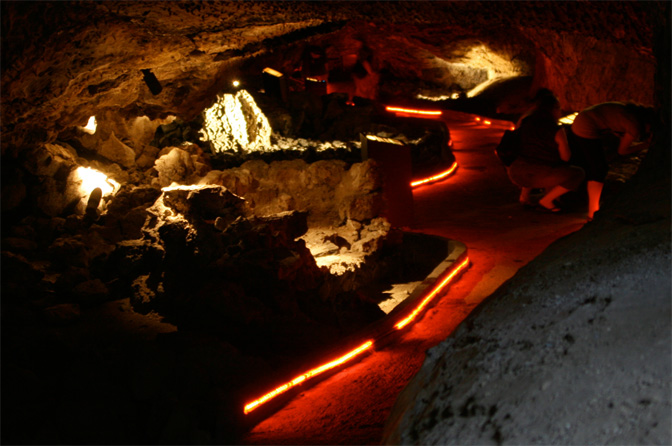
Illuminated walkway of Mushpot Cave

Mushpot is an easy cave to traverse and often serves as the introductory cave to the area. The entire length of the cave can be walked without ducking or stooping. It can be considered an extension of the visitor center.
