= Catacombs Cave =

Cave in Lava Beds National Monument, California

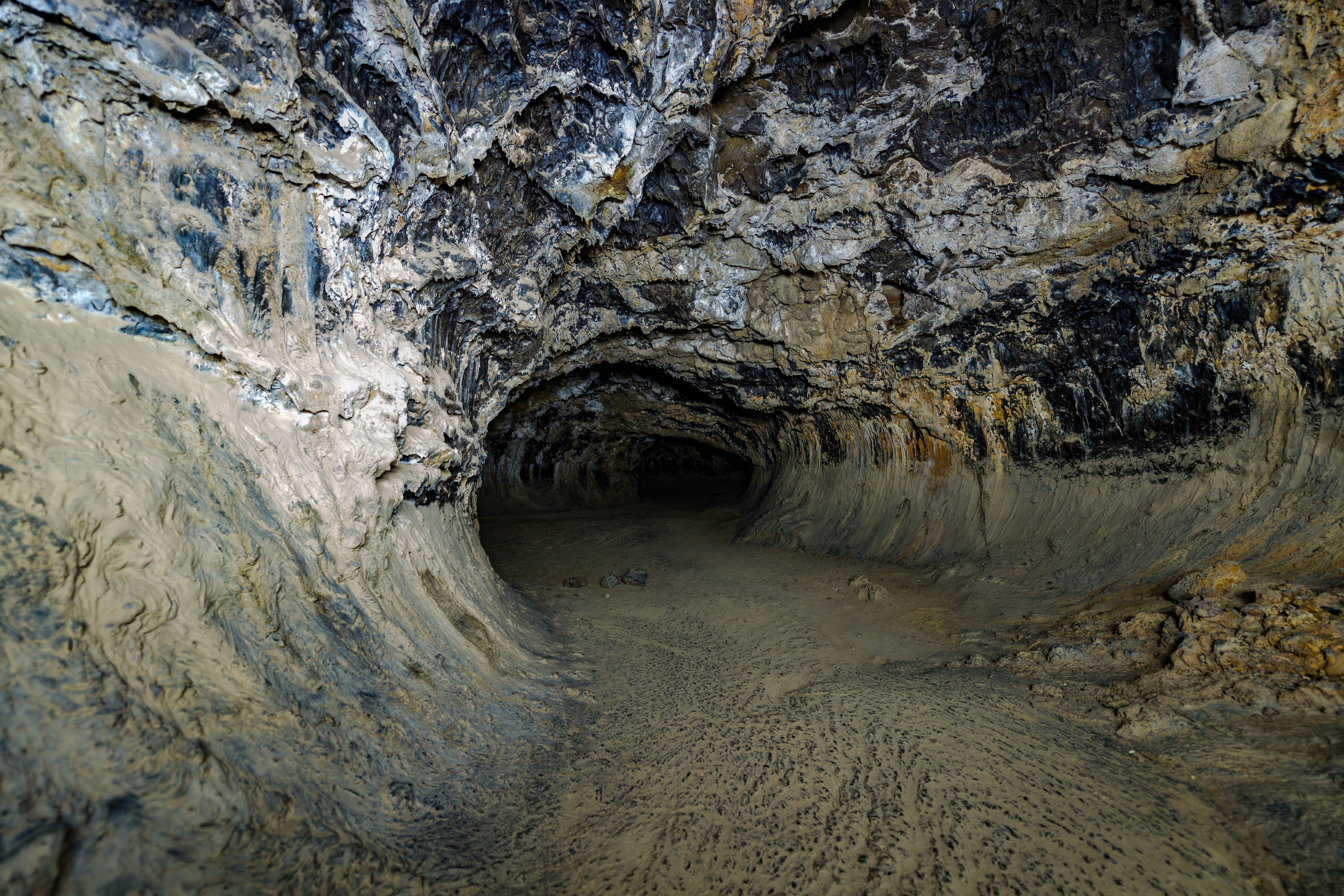
- Tunnel in Catacombs Cave, 2016

- Location within California
- Location: Lava Beds National Monument
- Coordinates: 41°42′18″N 121°30′55″W
- Length: 6,903 feet (2,104 m)
- Difficulty: Difficult

Catacombs Cave is a 6,903 foot (2,104 m) cave in Lava Beds National Monument in California. It is considered one of the most challenging caves accessible in the park. This very long cave is easily entered, but gradually increases in difficulty. It is possible to walk upright for approximately 800 feet (240 m) to the stairway, after which the ceiling rarely exceeds 3 feet (0.91 m). A few places exist where the ceiling height is less than 12 inches (300 mm).

== History ==
The caves found here were created by flows of smooth lava 10,500 to 65,000 years ago. J. D. Howard was the first to record notes on exploration of the underground passages. He named it after catacombs as the many side passages reminded him of the burial places of ancient Rome. Disapproving of how visitors treated the cave, Howard later wrote, "I am sorry I left the entrance to the Catacombs open after I first entered it. I opened it and enlarged it, then began to take visitors there. I should have closed it again and left it unknown as the better stalactites are now gone except in the remote crawlers".

In 2004, two 11-year-old children spent 27 hours lost in the cave. The duo went exploring away from their families, and confused, continued deeper into the cave instead of heading towards the exit. A rescue operation including a helicopter and several local sheriff's offices began. The two were found in an unmapped room, and required rescue by skilled cavers. They were retrieved in good health.

== Description ==
Catacombs Cave is popular among monument visitors to Lava Beds National Monument. Lavacicles and dripstone exposed on the ceiling and walls of several branching passages can be found within 200 feet (61 m) of its entrance.

The overall length of the accessible area of the Catacombs system is 2,000 feet (610 m) but rarely is it as wide as 250 feet (76 m). Yet, because of the abrupt turns, the interconnected passages, small complicated cascades, lava falls, interchanges that join passages together at different levels, and the numerous short distributaries that are nearly filled with lava rock, the total length of accessible passage may be more than 7,500 feet (2,300 m).

Most of the passages become inaccessible downstream because lava has ponded to within inches of their roofs, whereas some are inaccessible due to collapse. This very complicated system of irregularly branching tubes of different sizes, lengths, and trends makes Howard's name, the "Catacombs," particularly apt.

== Trail ==
The entrance to Catacombs Cave is on a well-marked trail that starts at the Catacombs parking lot beside Cave Loop Road. The trail leads east into and across a large collapse trench, which is a part of the line of major breakdowns coursing through the Cave Loop area. Beyond the climb out of the trench the trail continues east then southeast for 160 feet (49 m) and then drops into the 140 feet (43 m) long and 120 feet (37 m) wide Catacombs Basin. The trail skirts an apron of collapse blocks for 80 feet (24 m) and then turns due east and enters Catacombs Cave.
