= Lake Hill =

Lake Hill or Lakehill may refer to:

- Lake Hill Elementary School, a school in Greater Victoria, British Columbia, Canada
- Lakehill Ball, a baseball and softball club for youth near Lake Hill Elementary School
- Lakehill Soccer Association, a soccer club in Greater Victoria, British Columbia, Canada

== See also ==
- Lake Hills (disambiguation), several places
- Lakehills, Texas
