= Lava Beds National Monument =

National monument in California, United States

- IUCN category V (protected landscape/seascape)
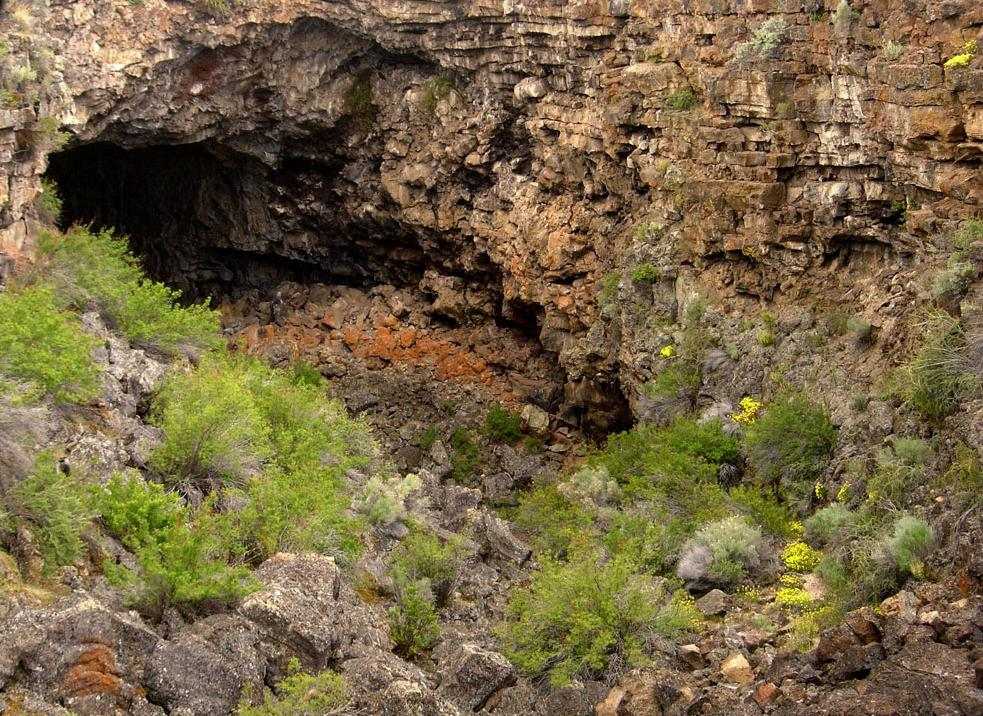
- A collapsed lava tube forms a cave entrance.

- Location within California Location within the United States
- Interactive map of Lava Beds National Monument
- Location: Siskiyou and Modoc counties, California, United States
- Nearest city: Tulelake, California
- Coordinates: 41°42′50″N 121°30′30″W
- Area: 46,692 acres (188.96 km^{2})
- Established: November 21, 1925
- Visitors: 143,659 (in 2025)
- Governing body: National Park Service
- Website: www.nps.gov/labe/index.htm
- Lava Beds National Monument Archeological District
- U.S. National Register of Historic Places
- U.S. Historic district
- NRHP reference No.: 75002182
- Added to NRHP: 1991

Lava Beds National Monument is located in northeastern California, in Siskiyou and Modoc counties. The monument lies on the northeastern flank of Medicine Lake Volcano, which is the largest volcano by area in the Cascade Range.

The region in and around Lava Beds National Monument lies at the junction of the Sierra-Klamath, Cascade, and Great Basin physiographic provinces. The monument was established as a national monument on November 21, 1925, and includes more than 46,000 acres (190 km^{2}).

Lava Beds National Monument has numerous lava tubes, with 27 having marked entrances and developed trails for public access and exploration. The monument also offers trails through the high Great Basin xeric shrubland desert landscape and the volcanic field. In 1872 and 1873, the area was the site of the Modoc War, involving a band led by Kintpuash (also known as Captain Jack). The area of Captain Jack's Stronghold was named in his honor.

== Geologic formations ==
Lava Beds National Monument is geologically significant because of its wide variety of volcanic formations, including lava tubes, fumaroles, cinder cones, spatter cones, pit craters, hornitos, maars, lava flows, and volcanic fields.

Volcanic eruptions on the Medicine Lake shield volcano have created a rugged landscape punctuated by these many landforms of volcanism.

=== Cones ===
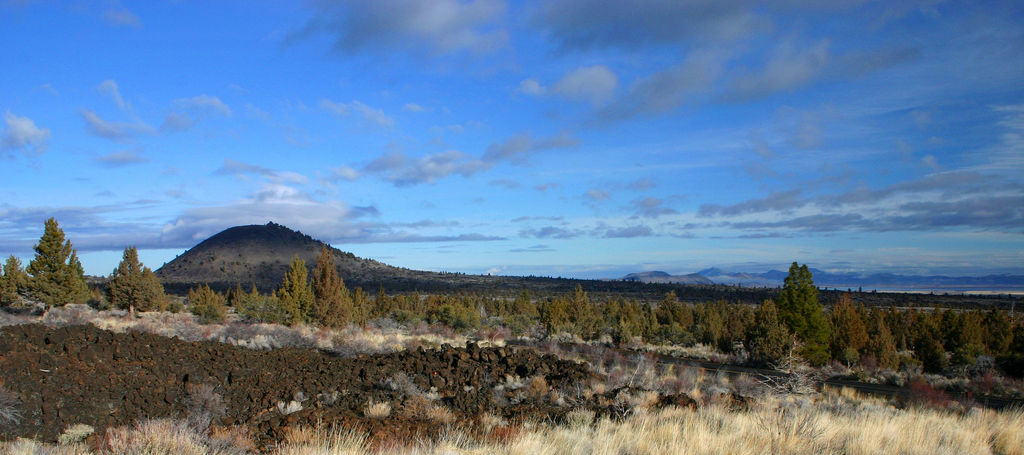
Schonchin Butte cinder cone

Cinder cones are formed when magma is under great pressure. It is released in a fountain of lava, blown into the air from a central vent. The lava cools as it falls, forming cinders that pile up around the vent. When the pressure has been relieved, the rest of the lava flows from the base of the cone. Cinder cones are typically monogenetic.

The cinder cones of Hippo Butte, Three Sisters, Juniper Butte, and Crescent Butte are all older than the Mammoth and Modoc Crater flows, more than 30,000–40,000 years old. Eagle Nest Butte and Bearpaw Butte are 114,000 years old. The Schonchin Butte cinder cone and the andesitic flow from its base were formed around 62,000 years ago. The flow that formed Valentine Cave erupted 10,850 years ago. An eruption that formed The Castles is younger than the Mammoth Crater flows. Even younger were eruptions from Fleener Chimneys, such as the Devil's Homestead flow, 10,500 years ago, and Black Crater 3,025 years ago. About 1,110 years ago, plus or minus 60 years, the Callahan flow was produced by an eruption from Cinder Butte. Though Cinder Butte is just outside the boundary of the monument, the Callahan flow is in Lava Beds and is the youngest flow in the monument.

Spatter cones are built out of thicker lava. The lava is thrown out of the vent and builds, layer by layer, a chimney surrounding the vent. Fleener Chimneys and Black Crater are examples of spatter cones.

=== Lava flows ===
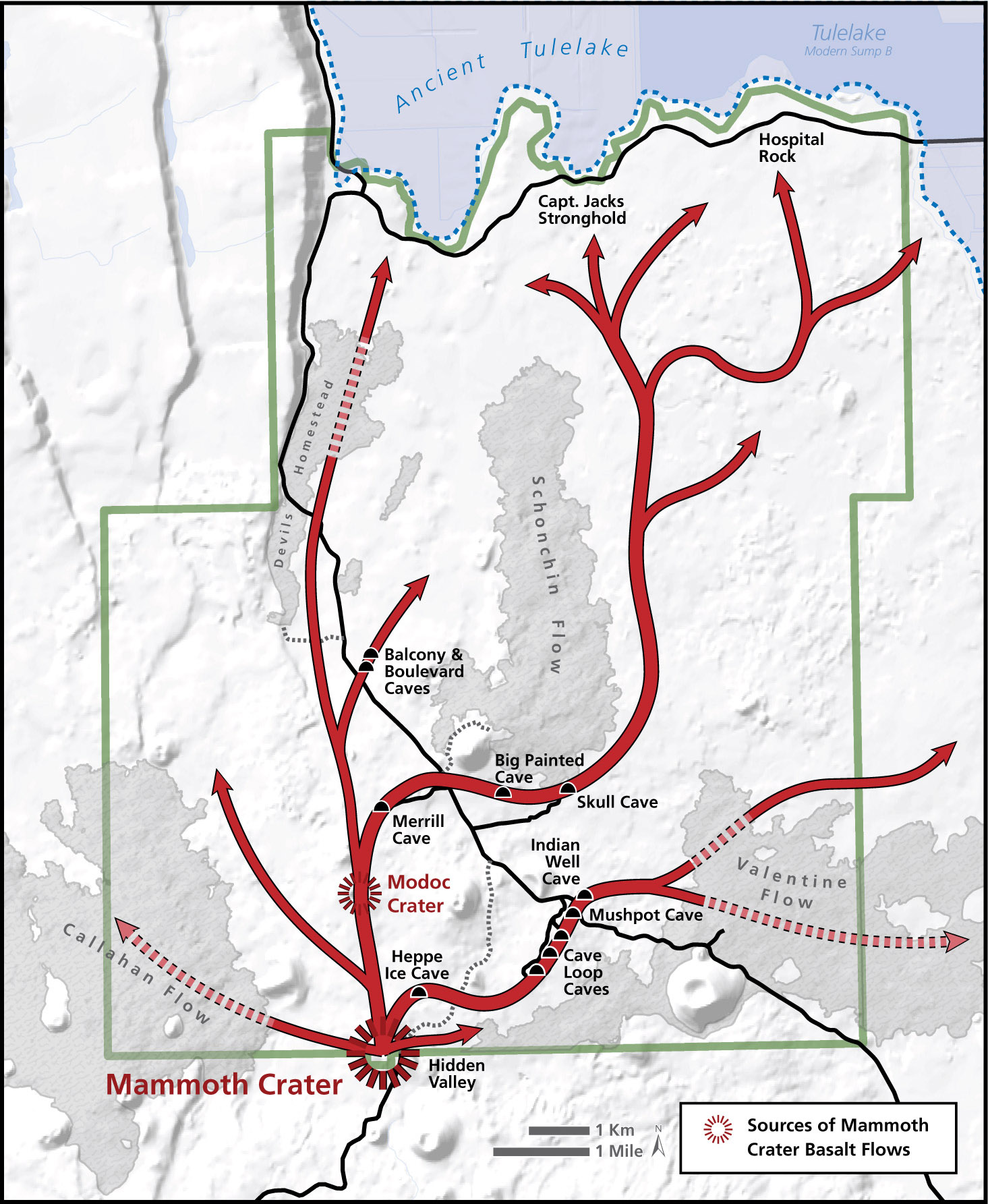
The majority of cave-forming basaltic lava flows in the monument originated at Mammoth Crater, covering roughly 60% of the surface of the park at present.

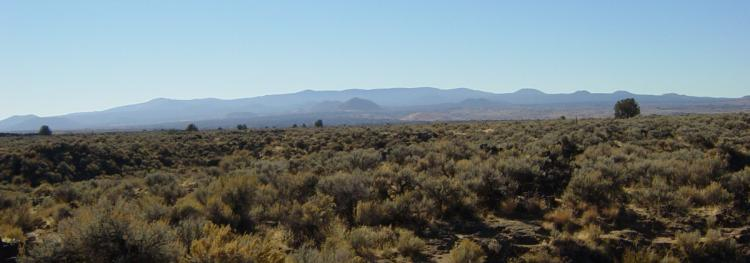
Medicine Lake Volcano from Captain Jack's Stronghold

Roughly ninety percent of the lava in the Lava Beds Monument is basaltic. There are primarily two kinds of basaltic lava flows: pahoehoe and ʻaʻā. Pahoehoe is smooth, often ropy and is the most common type of lava in Lava Beds. ʻAʻā is formed when pahoehoe cools and loses some of its gases. ʻAʻā is rough, sharp, and jagged; an excellent example is the Devil's Homestead lava flow, which originated at Fleener Chimneys. Most of the rest of the lava in the monument is andesitic. Pumice, a type of rhyolitic lava, also is found covering the monument; this rained down around 900 years ago during the eruption of Glass Mountain.

The flows from Mammoth and Modoc Craters comprise about two-thirds of the lava in the monument. Over 30 separate lava flows located in the park range in age from 2,000,000 years BP to 1,110 years BP. Some of the major lava flows within Lava Beds National Monument include the Callahan Flow; Schonchin Flow; Mammoth Crater Flow; Modoc Crater Flow; and Devil's Homestead Flow.

=== Lava fields ===
Gillem Bluff, a fault scarp, was created as the region stretched and a block of earth dropped down along this fault (see Basin and Range Province). The tuff layer on top of Gillem Bluff is 2,000,000 years old, indicating the rock layers beneath are even older. The oldest lava flow from the Medicine Lake Volcano within the monument is the Basalt of Hovey Point, near Captain Jack's Stronghold, which is 450,000 years old. Petroglyph Point was created about 275,000 years ago when cinders erupted through the shallow water of Tule Lake; violent explosions of ash and steam formed layers upon layers of tuff.

The caldera is thought to have formed by subsidence, during which basalt and andesite were erupted up on the slopes.

=== Lava tubes ===
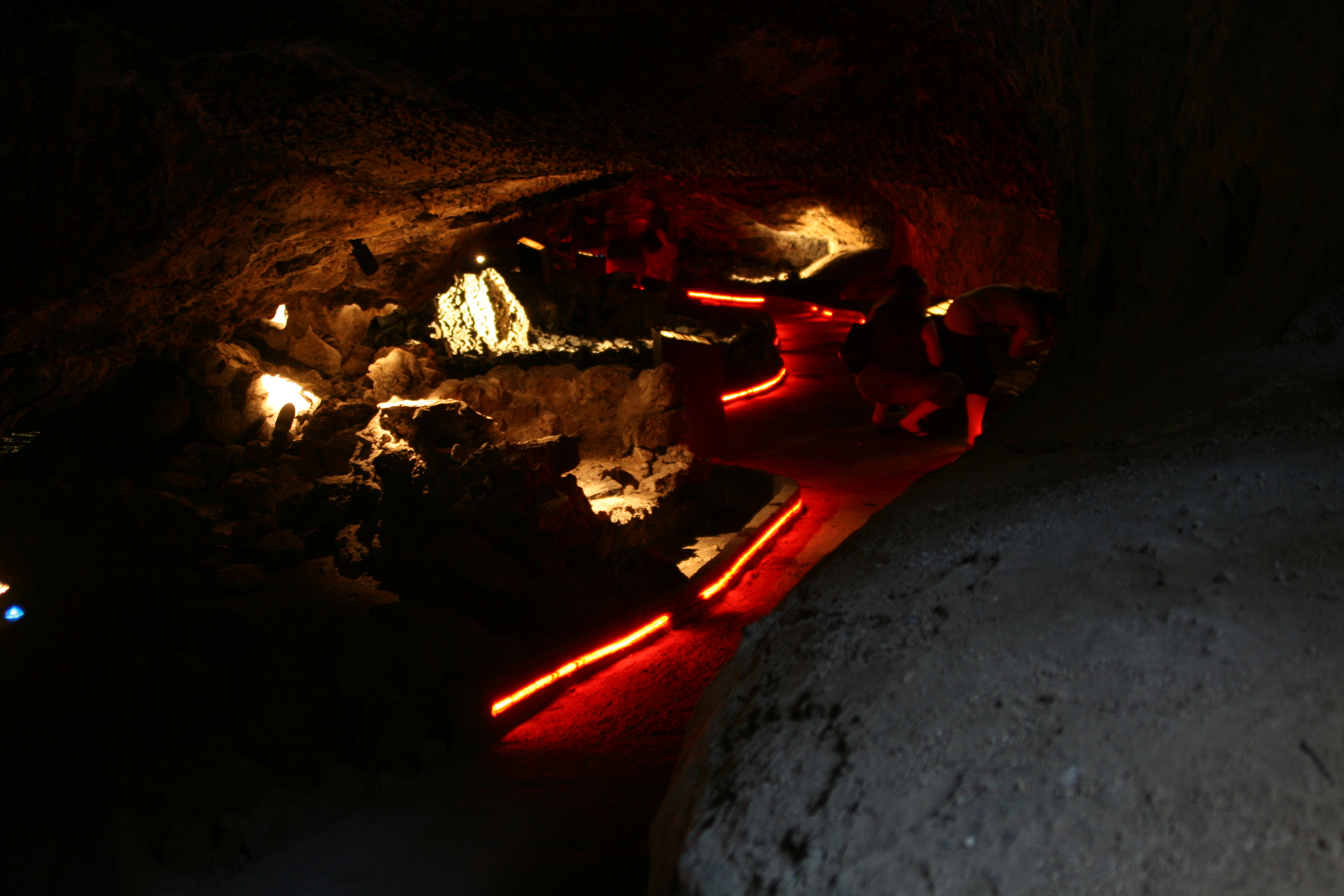
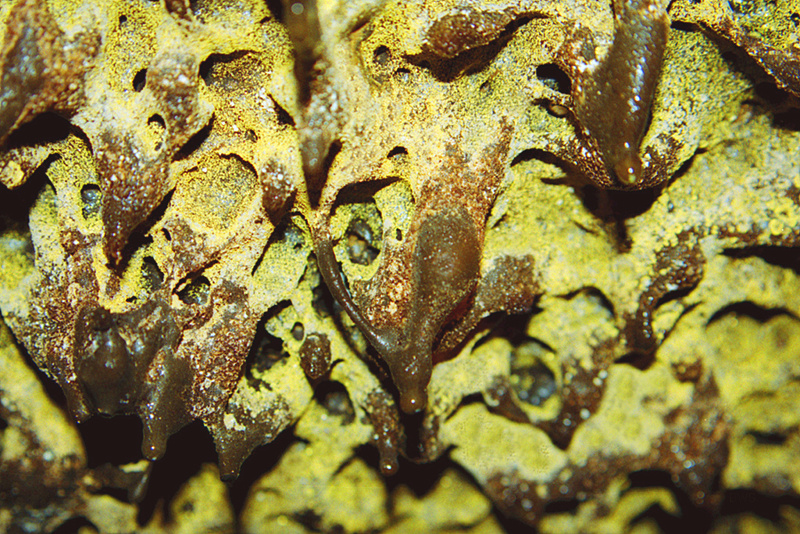
Illuminated lava tube, and lavacicles with a biofilm of golden hydrophobic bacteria on ceiling of Golden Dome Cave

Lava flows dated to about 30,000–40,000 years ago formed most of the lava tubes in the monument. As the hot basaltic lava flowed downhill, the top cooled and crusted over, insulating the rest of the lava and forming lava tubes. Lavacicles on the ceiling of a lava tube were produced as the level of lava in the tube retreated and the viscous lava on the ceiling dripped as it cooled.

Dripstone was created when lava splashed on the inside walls of the tubes. The leaching of minerals from pumice gravel, soils, and overlying rock provides for deposition of secondary speleothems in lava tubes.

Lava Beds National Monument has the largest concentration of lava tubes in North America. One has electrical lighting; the others are illuminated by ceiling collapse portals or require flashlights, available on loan.

Notable examples in the park include Catacombs Cave, Merrill Cave, Mushpot Cave, and Valentine Cave.

=== Recent activity ===
A series of small earthquakes in late 1988 has been attributed to subsidence in the caldera. North-northeast trending ground cracks, as well as north-northeast trending vent series show relationships between tectonism and volcanism. One notable ground crack, the Big Crack, extends along the northeastern boundary of the monument.

== Climate ==
The high elevation, semi-arid desert environment of Lava Beds National Monument receives an average of 14.22 in (36 cm) of annual precipitation, including 43.2 in (110 cm) of snowfall. The climate is characterized by warm, dry summers and cold, moderately snowy winters. The monthly daily average temperature ranges from 31.8 °F (−0.1 °C) in December to 68.92 °F (20.5 °C) in July; there are an average of 23.8 days with 90 °F (32 °C)+ highs annually, and 8.4 days where the high does not rise above freezing. The average window for freezing temperatures is September 20 thru June 6.

Climate data for Lava Beds National Monument, California, 1991–2020 normals, extremes 1948–present
Month	Jan	Feb	Mar	Apr	May	Jun	Jul	Aug	Sep	Oct	Nov	Dec	Year
Record high °F (°C)	62 (17)	68 (20)	75 (24)	88 (31)	94 (34)	99 (37)	103 (39)	102 (39)	99 (37)	90 (32)	74 (23)	64 (18)	103 (39)
Mean maximum °F (°C)	55.6 (13.1)	58.5 (14.7)	66.9 (19.4)	74.1 (23.4)	83.5 (28.6)	90.4 (32.4)	96.2 (35.7)	95.5 (35.3)	90.9 (32.7)	80.1 (26.7)	67.1 (19.5)	52.4 (11.3)	97.7 (36.5)
Mean daily maximum °F (°C)	42.9 (6.1)	45.8 (7.7)	51.5 (10.8)	56.7 (13.7)	66.4 (19.1)	75.7 (24.3)	86.0 (30.0)	85.5 (29.7)	78.1 (25.6)	65.5 (18.6)	50.4 (10.2)	41.2 (5.1)	62.1 (16.7)
Daily mean °F (°C)	32.8 (0.4)	35.2 (1.8)	39.7 (4.3)	43.9 (6.6)	52.4 (11.3)	59.8 (15.4)	69.2 (20.7)	68.3 (20.2)	61.5 (16.4)	50.9 (10.5)	38.8 (3.8)	31.8 (−0.1)	48.7 (9.3)
Mean daily minimum °F (°C)	22.7 (−5.2)	24.5 (−4.2)	27.9 (−2.3)	31.1 (−0.5)	38.3 (3.5)	43.8 (6.6)	52.5 (11.4)	51.2 (10.7)	44.8 (7.1)	36.2 (2.3)	27.3 (−2.6)	22.3 (−5.4)	35.2 (1.8)
Mean minimum °F (°C)	9.7 (−12.4)	11.8 (−11.2)	15.3 (−9.3)	20.2 (−6.6)	26.2 (−3.2)	31.2 (−0.4)	41.0 (5.0)	40.4 (4.7)	32.0 (0.0)	22.4 (−5.3)	15.1 (−9.4)	9.0 (−12.8)	4.5 (−15.3)
Record low °F (°C)	−13 (−25)	−13 (−25)	3 (−16)	11 (−12)	19 (−7)	21 (−6)	29 (−2)	30 (−1)	21 (−6)	9 (−13)	2 (−17)	−18 (−28)	−18 (−28)
Average precipitation inches (mm)	1.63 (41)	2.10 (53)	1.85 (47)	1.30 (33)	1.37 (35)	0.99 (25)	0.36 (9.1)	0.34 (8.6)	0.44 (11)	0.85 (22)	1.46 (37)	1.53 (39)	14.22 (360.7)
Average snowfall inches (cm)	8.7 (22)	9.3 (24)	6.9 (18)	4.0 (10)	1.0 (2.5)	0.1 (0.25)	0.0 (0.0)	0.0 (0.0)	0.0 (0.0)	0.3 (0.76)	5.0 (13)	7.9 (20)	43.2 (110.51)
Average precipitation days (≥ 0.01 in)	10.9	9.2	11.4	9.9	7.4	6.1	2.8	2.2	2.6	5.2	9.1	7.9	84.7
Average snowy days (≥ 0.1 in)	6.4	5.1	5.7	4.0	0.5	0.1	0.0	0.0	0.0	0.6	3.4	5.0	30.8
Source 1: NOAA
Source 2: National Weather Service

== Flora and fauna ==
=== Flora ===
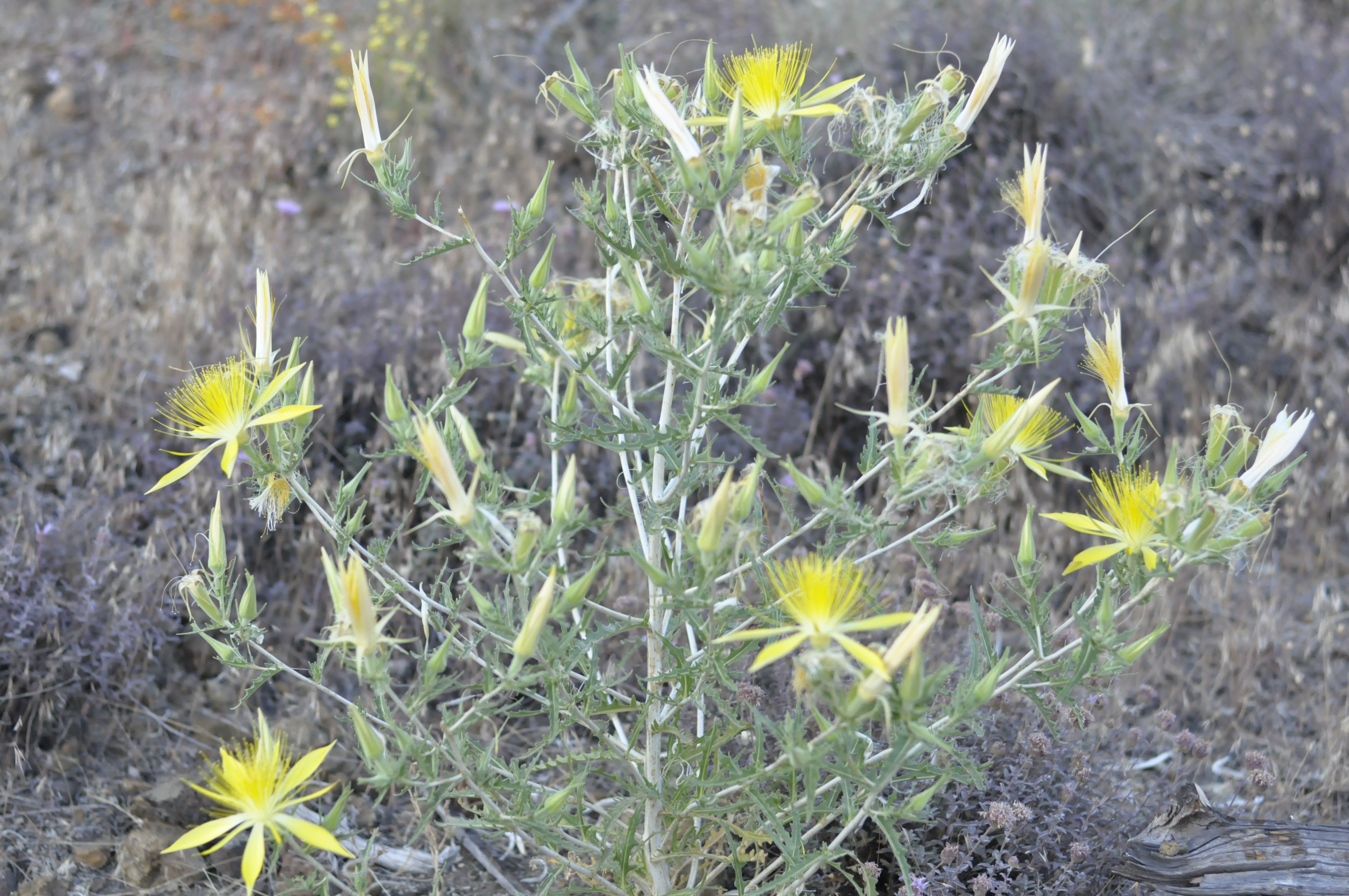
Yellow blazing star (Mentzelia laevicaulis)

The lava tube collapse systems and lava outcrops support a wide diversity of plant life, including lichens and mosses, as well as desert sweet (Chamaebatiaria millefolium), purple desert sage (Salvia dorrii carnosa), and yellow blazing star (Mentzelia laevicaulis). A variety of fern species are present in cave entrances, including the spreading wood fern (Dryopteris expansa) and the western swordfern (Polystichum munitum). These species are outside of their normal range, which is 90–125 mi (145–201 km) west on the northern California coastline.

=== Fauna ===
Despite harsh, semi-arid conditions, native wildlife has adapted to the environmental constraints present in the region. There are no terrestrial water resources in Lava Beds National Monument. Some animals obtain water from caves, while others fly about twenty km (12 miles) north to Tule Lake. Federal and state animal species of special concern in the Monument include the Cooper's hawk (Accipiter cooperii), fringed myotis (Myotis thysanodes), long-eared myotis (Myotis evotis), long-legged myotis (Myotis volans), pallid bat (Antrozous pallidus), silver-haired bat (Lasionycteris noctivigans), Townsend's big-eared bat (Corynorhinus townsendii), western small-footed myotis (Myotis ciliolabrum), and American badger (Taxidea taxus).

Because of a lack of surface water, amphibian presence in the monument is limited. The most common species found in the monument is the Pacific tree frog (Pseudacris regilla). This species is also found in the biologically rich cave entrances in the monument. Reptile species found in the monument include the northern sagebrush lizard (Sceloporus graciosus graciosus), Great Basin fence lizard (Sceloporus occidentalis biseriatus), western skink (Eumeces skiltonianus skiltonianus), Rocky Mountain rubber boa (Charina bottae utahensis), gopher snake (Pituophis melanoleucus), desert night snake (Hypsiglena torquata deserticola), and western rattlesnake (Crotalus viridis).

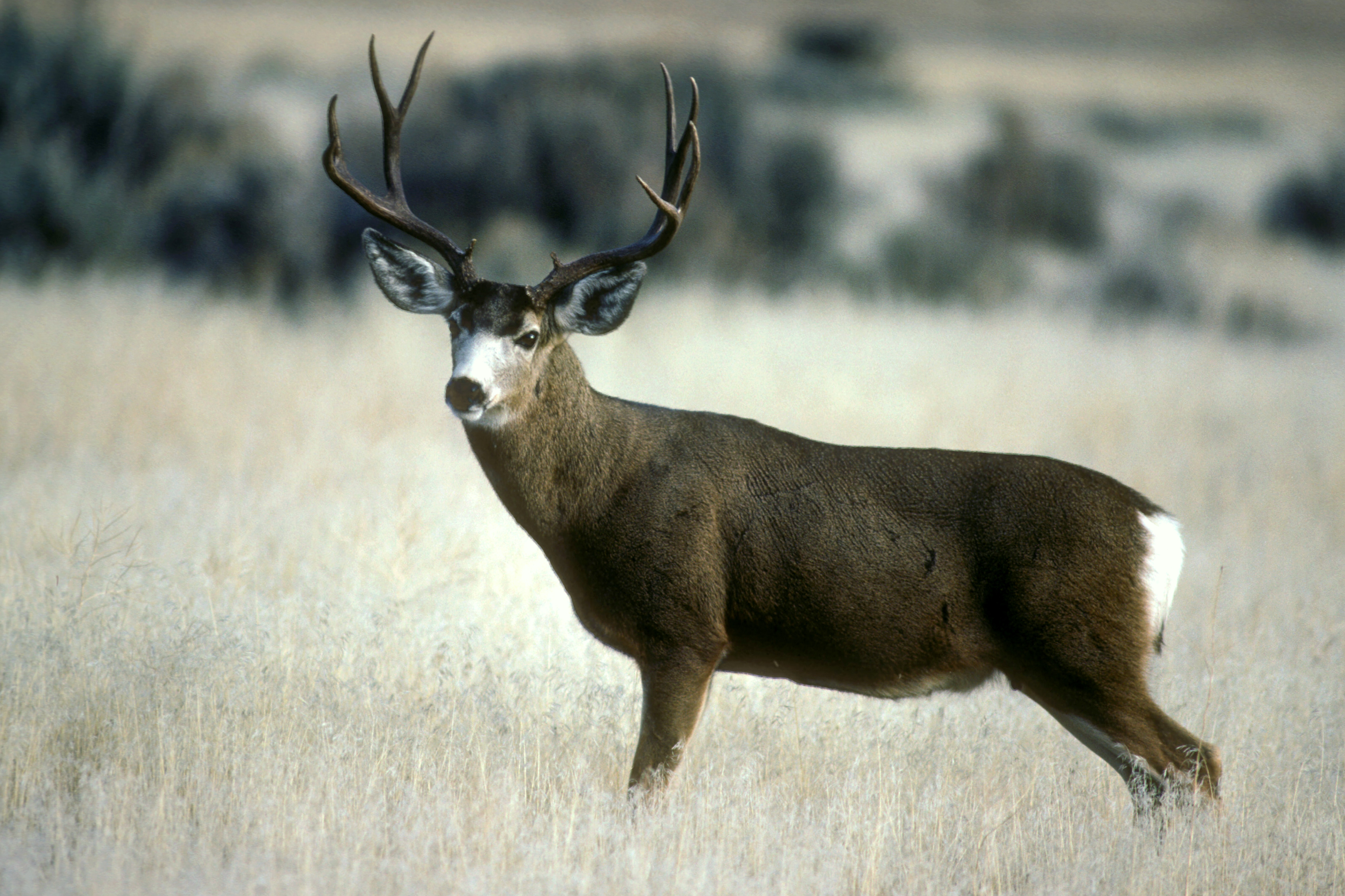
Mule deer

Key animal species by habitat:

- Bunch grass-sagebrush grasslands: mule deer, gopher snake, coyote, prairie falcon, western meadowlark, Anderson's larkspur, yellow-bellied marmot, kangaroo rat
- Ponderosa-juniper brushlands: pronghorn, bobcat, scrub jay, jackrabbit, mountain bluebird,
- Pine forest: mountain lion, bald eagle (winter resident), golden-mantled ground squirrel
- Rocky lava flows: western fence lizard, western rattlesnake
- Cave mouths and interior passages: violet-green swallow, Brazilian free-tailed bat, Townsend's big-eared bat, Pacific tree frog, pika, bushy-tailed woodrat
- Lake shore areas: skunk, raccoon, great horned owl, short-eared owl.

== History ==
=== Archeological site ===
Lava Beds National Monument includes Petroglyph Point, one of the largest panels of Native American rock art in the United States. The region was historically occupied by the Modoc people. The Lava Beds National Monument Archeological District was listed on the National Register of Historic Places in March 1991.

=== Modoc War ===
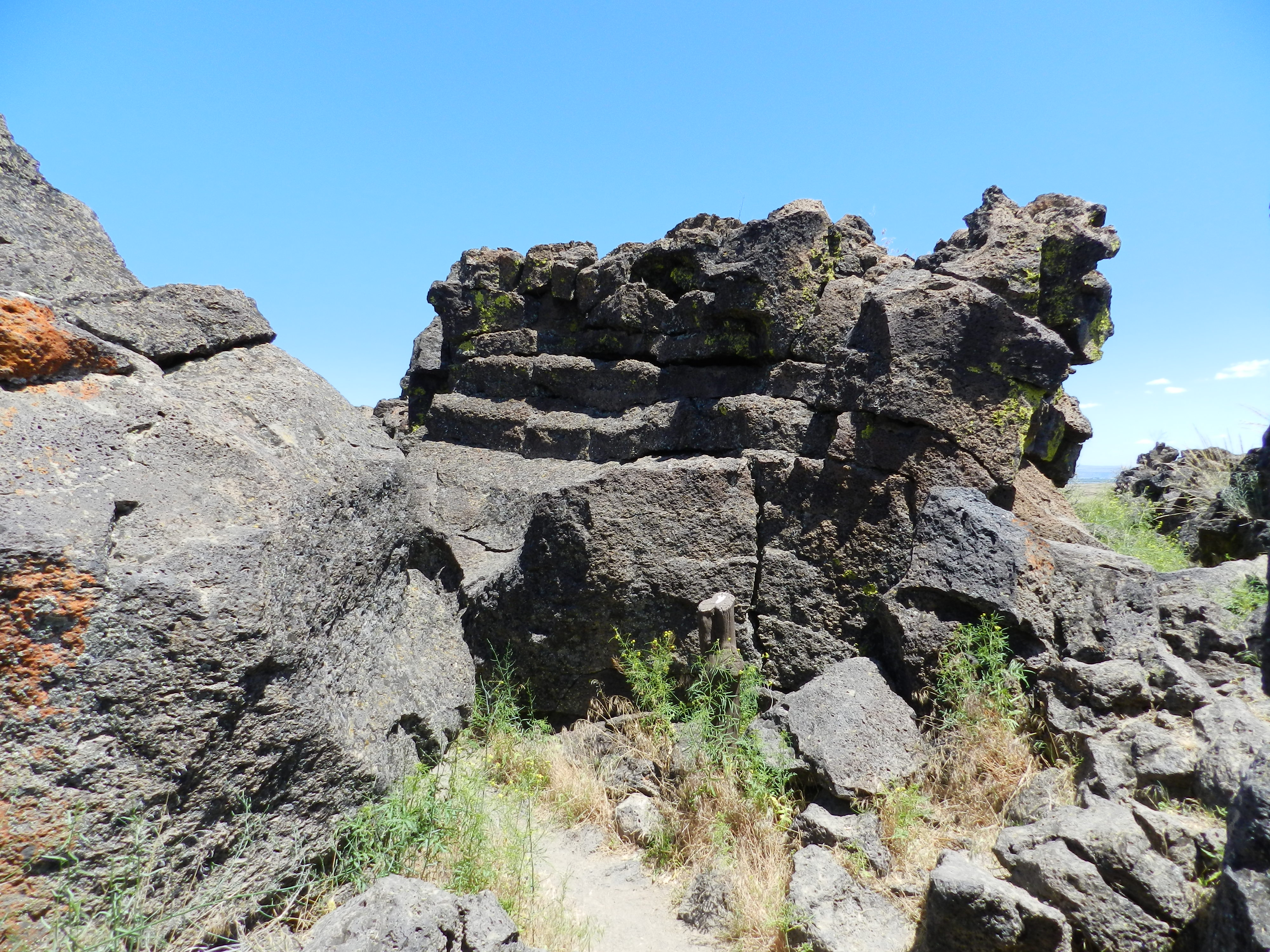
Captain Jack's Stronghold

During the Modoc War of 1872–1873, warriors of a band led by Kintpuash (Captain Jack) used the lava beds as a defensive stronghold after unarmed Modoc prisoners were fired on by American cavalry after the Battle of Lost River. A long standing cultural center for the Modoc, they consolidated their remaining forces in a natural lava fortress that was later named Captain Jack's Stronghold. From this defensive base, a group of 53 fighting men and their families held off US Army forces, amounting to ten times the Modocs' population, for five months.

In April 1873, a meeting of the Peace Commission between representatives of the Modoc and American Government, resulted in the death of Edward Canby and Reverend Eleazer Smith. Details of the altercation vary, but public outcry at the death of Canby was substantial, as the only casualty of the Indian Wars who held the rank of general at the time of his death. Army reinforcements were brought in, and after a protracted war the Modoc were eventually forced to surrender.

Kintpuash and Modoc leaders Schonchin John, Black Jim, and Boston Charley were hung by the neck until death and beheaded at the conclusion of an American war tribunal at Fort Klamath. First hand accounts detail that during their confinement at Fort Klamath, war crimes were committed against Kintpuash and Schonchin as they were repeatedly beaten and drugged with opium, including the morning immediately before their tribunal hearings.

=== Establishment of the monument ===
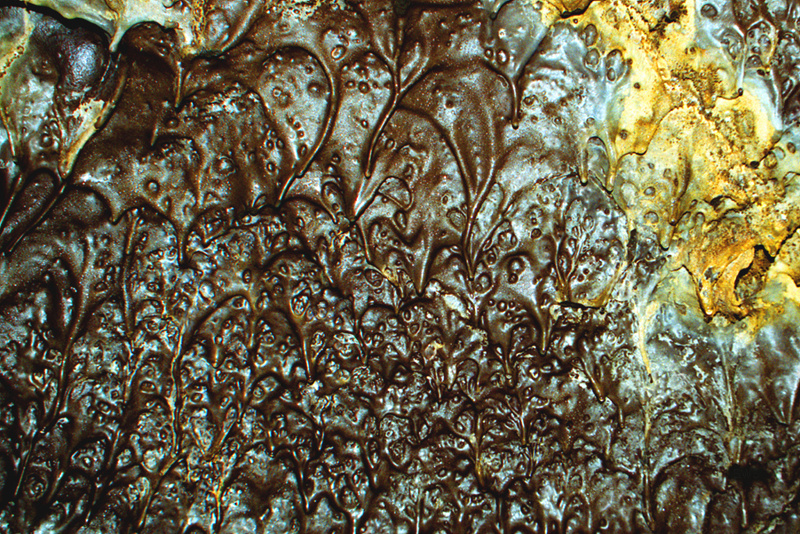
Brown lavacicles on the ceiling of Hopkins Chocolate Cave; named by cave explorer E. L. Hopkins and also visited by J. D. Howard, both leaving graffiti

An early steward for the land was J. D. Howard, a miller residing in Klamath Falls. He explored the area intimately beginning in 1917, naming geographic features and making caves accessible. With the area growing attention, he noticed visitors beginning to damage the cave features.

Howard's perceived need to preserve the lava tubes and the area's other geological features was a major reason why he vigorously pushed for a federally protected status. He would photograph interiors of each cave as part of an effort to persuade people to protect the area. In a letter written in 1923, Howard urged United States Forest Service officials, state legislators, and community leaders to declare the caves a park; "This is the last of Park sites in the States, and is far Superior to all the others as it embraces enough phenomena to keep one busy for at least Three Month Sight Seeing with Cap Jack’s Stronghold to study on leisure hours."

Howard's campaign was successful, as Lava Beds National Monument was signed into existence by President Calvin Coolidge on November 21, 1925. It was created under the auspices of the 1906 Antiquities Act.

=== Later expansion ===
The only expansion in the modern era occurred in 2011 when the monument expanded by roughly 132 acres (53 ha). An administrative transfer brought two parcels of land which were previously managed by the Bureau of Reclamation and the Bureau of Land Management into National Park Service management. These two parcels adjoin the Petroglyph Point Unit of the monument.

=== Caldwell Fire ===
About 31,000 acres of Lava Beds National Monument (70% of the monument) was scorched by the Caldwell Fire in July 2020. The fire started with a lightning strike on July 21. As winds and storms increased the next day, it became a fast-moving fire and part of the July Complex Fire. While the visitor center and park residences were not damaged, areas south of park headquarters in many places were severely burned, including the now ash and charcoal covered Mammoth Crater.

== Lava Beds Wilderness ==
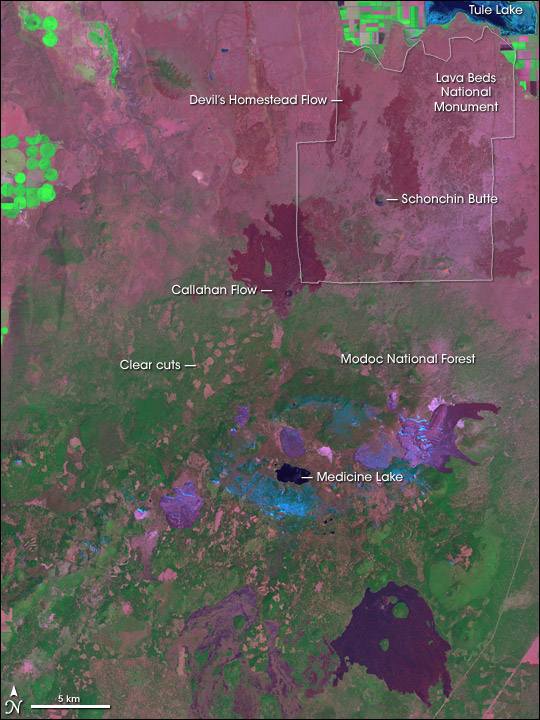
A false-color satellite image of the park and surrounding area (click image to enlarge)

The Lava Beds National Wilderness is a 28,460-acre (11,520 ha) wilderness area within the Lava Beds National Monument. It was designated by the US Congress on October 13, 1972, with passage of Public Law 92-493. The wilderness protects more than half of the national monument in two separate eastern and western units. The larger eastern unit contains the extensive Schonchin lava flow on the east side of the monument. The western unit covers the monument's area within the transition zone of the Cascade Range's montane southern end and the arid Modoc Plateau ecosystems.

The different soil types creates plant community diversity in the wilderness area, providing various habitats for a wide range of wildlife. The numerous coyotes and foxes, as well as raptors, feed on rodents such as the jackrabbit and kangaroo rat. The kangaroo rat is especially adapted to waterless environments because it does not need to drink. It obtains water as a byproduct of the oxidation of nutrients in the seeds it eats.

Many raptors are seen in the wilderness area, with 24 species of hawks identified. The monument is located on the Pacific Flyway, and the bald eagle winters in the northern portion of the wilderness area.

The National Park Service manages the Lava Beds wilderness area and has several restrictions in place. Camping is prohibited near cave entrances or trails. Open campfires may be prohibited during very hot and dry weather.

=== Lava Beds trails ===
The Lava Beds National Monument has 13 hiking trails, all of which cross or enter the backcountry. The most popular trails are short, but lead to a number of historic sites as to several geological areas within the Lava Beds Wilderness. The long trails are mostly in designated wilderness areas.

These trails are primarily associated with park attractions, especially the Lava Beds geological wilderness, and are sometimes out-and-back day hikes, and in many cases are improved boardwalks and supported with interpretive signs and exhibits.

Trail name (arranged by distance from Visitor Center)	Description	Trailhead(s)	Length
Short trails
Bunchgrass Trail	Follows the northeast side of Crescent Butte	Starts across from Site B-7 in the campground.	1 mi (1.6 km)
Missing Link Trail	Links the Three Sisters Trail to the Bunchgrass Trail, creating a 10 mi (16 km) loop.	Begins on the Bunchgrass Trail, about 0.5 mi (0.80 km) from campground B-Loop.	0.7 mi (1.1 km)
Heppe Ice Cave	Leads into Heppe Cave.	Located on the road to Mammoth Crater, 2.2 mi (3.5 km) from the main park road.	0.4 mi (0.64 km)
Big Nasty Trail	Named after a rough lava area covered by brush, described as "big and nasty".	Starts on Mammoth Crater rim, on the Hidden Valley pullout.	1 mi (1.6 km)
Schonchin Butte Trail	Steep trail, has a 500-foot elevation gain and leads to the lookout building	Located on Schonchin Butte	0.9 mi (1.4 km)
Symbol Bridge Trail	Winds past interesting lava tube structures and other geological features	On the first parking area of Skull Cave road, across from the Missing Link Trail	Windy 0.75 mi (1.21 km)
Black Crater and Thomas-Wright Battlefield Trail	Combines volcanism and history. Within season leads around good views of wildflower displays	Within the Thomas-Wright Battlefield memorial	0.3 mi (0.48 km) to the Crater, then 1.2 mi (1.9 km)
Gillem Bluff	Climbs to the top of Gillem Bluff for a view of Gillem's Camp. Has a 550-foot elevation gain.	Gillem Bluff	0.7 mi (1.1 km)
Captain Jack's Stronghold Trail	A rough terrain loop trail with two self-guided interpretive areas through the heart of the Modoc War historical battlefield.	Captain Jack's Stronghold 41°49′18″N 121°30′18″W	Inner loop: .6 mi (0.97 km). Outer loop: 1.1 mi (1.8 km)
Petroglyph Point Trail	Impressive view of the basin and the Medicine Lake Volcano.	Northeast side of Petroglyph Point about .3 mi (0.48 km) beyond the bulletin board.	1.6 mi (2.6 km)
Long trails
Three Sisters Trail	Loops out into the wilderness and returns to Skull Cave Road.	Trailhead at the campground from A-Loop	8.8 mi (14.2 km)
Lyons Trail	Crosses the wilderness area on a north–south axis between Skull Cave parking area and Hospital Rock on the North Boundary Road.	Skull Cave parkinglot	9.8 mi (15.8 km)
Whitney Butte Trail	Crosses the wilderness in an east–west direction around Whitney Butte. Has best view of Mount Shasta and Callahan lava flow	Trailhead at the Merrill Cave parking area.	3.3 mi (5.3 km)

== See also ==
- List of national monuments of the United States
- Medicine Lake Volcano
- Volcanic Legacy Scenic Byway
- List of Klamath Basin birds
