= Judson Dean Howard =

American millwright, chemist, and speleologist (died 1961)

J. D. Howard
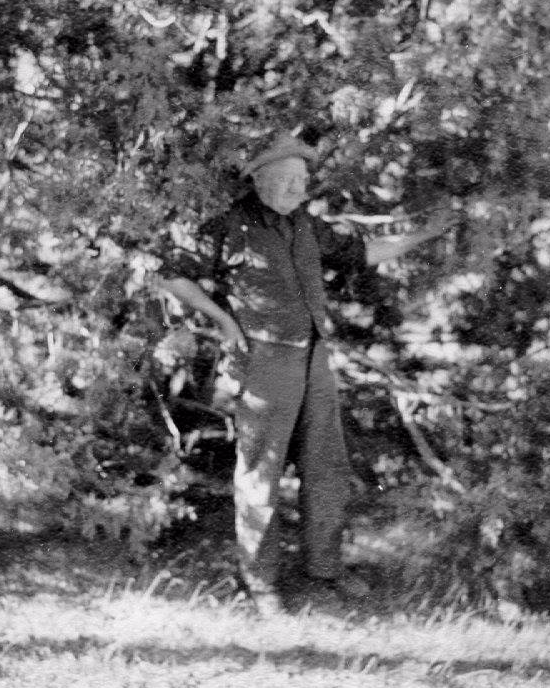
- Historic photo of J.D. Howard, ca. 1950
- Born: January 9, 1875 (Alt birth dates 1878 or 1880); Fort Atkinson, Iowa
- Died: December 15, 1961; Klamath Falls, Oregon
- Other names: Judd Howard

Judson Dean Howard (c. 1878 – 1961) was an American millwright, chemist, and speleologist known as the "Man Behind the Monument" for his campaign to federally protect Lava Beds National Monument in California.

== Biography ==
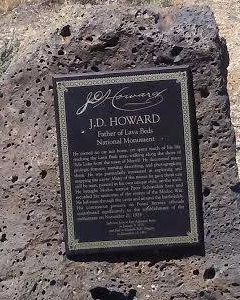
J. D. Howard plaque near Mushpot Cave

=== Early life ===
According to the National Park Service, Howard was born in Fort Atkinson, Iowa on January 9, 1875. Other sources say he was born in either 1878 or 1880. He was a man of small build, standing only 5 feet 5 inches (1.65 m) tall and weighing 130 pounds (59 kg). He grew up in the midwest, eventually studying chemistry at the school that later became the Colorado School of Mines, specializing in flour chemistry. He came west in the early 1900s, working in Los Angeles before moving to Oregon. He found a job as a miller in Klamath Basin in 1916, and it was at this time he first came across the lava beds that would later form the monument.

=== Lava Beds National Monument ===
Howard's intimacy with the Lava Beds began September 10, 1917. That first trip set the tone for future journeys as Howard named and explored several caves. From then on his diaries indicate a continuum of visits. In those early years, Howard often had to crawl on his hands and knees through dense stands of mountain mahogany. Entrances to undiscovered caves frequently were possible only after clearing walls of rock. He did not own a car, so he would walk dozens of miles a day or be chauffeured around by his friends and associates.

During his time exploring the area, Howard named over 50 caves and 16 geologic features. He kept extensive journals of his exploration.

After he helped make the area more accessible by road, Howard expressed disappointment at seeing the area damaged by careless or uncaring visitors. Howard once said "I am sorry I made a road up to the place. Further, I am sorry I left the entrance to the Catacombs open after I first entered it. I opened it and enlarged it, then began to take visitors there. I should have closed it again and left it unknown as the better stalactites are now gone except in the remote crawlers".

Howard's perceived need to preserve the lava tubes and the area's other geological features was a major reason why he vigorously pushed for a federally protected status. He would photograph interiors of each cave as part of an effort to persuade people to protect the area. In a letter written in 1923, Howard urged United States Forest Service officials, state legislators, and community leaders to declare the caves a park; "This is the last of Park sites in the States, and is far Superior to all the others as it embraces enough phenomena to keep one busy for at least Three Month Sight Seeing with Cap Jack’s Stronghold to study on leisure hours."

Howard's campaign was successful, as Lava Beds National Monument was signed into existence by President Calvin Coolidge on November 21, 1925. It was created under the auspices of the 1906 Antiquities Act.

Howard died on December 15, 1961, in Klamath Falls. He never married.

== Legacy ==
Howard's legacy has mostly gone unrecognized except for a plaque placed on a rock outside the entrance to Mushpot Cave. It reads:

"He owned no car nor house, yet spent much of his life studying the Lava Beds area, walking along the shore of Tule Lake from the town of Merrill. He discovered many geologic features, naming, describing, and photographing them. He was particularly interested in exploring and mapping the caves. Many of the names he gave them can still be seen, painted in his own unique style, on the walls. He brought Modoc warrior Peter Schonchin here and recorded his memories of the events of the Modoc War. He led tours through the caves and around the battlefields. His continuous pressure on Forest Service officials contributed significantly to the establishment of the monument on November 21, 1925. Judd was born at Fort Atkinson, Iowa, on January 9, 1875, and died in Klamath Falls, Oregon, on December 15, 1961."

Although park files contain some information on his explorations and discoveries, he remains something of an enigma. The only mark he left behind are names he painted inside many of the caves he named. Howard contributed the earliest photographs of cave interiors, but did not like to be photographed himself.
