= Medicine Lake Volcano =

Shield volcano in northeastern California, United States

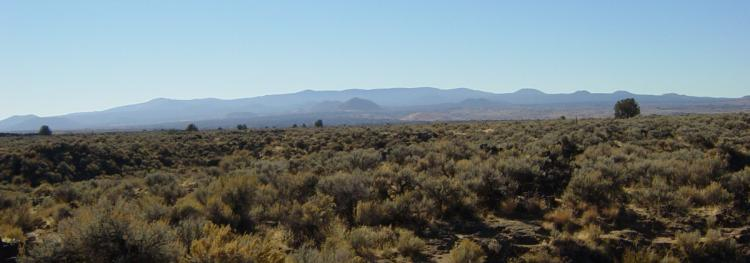
- Medicine Lake volcano as seen from Lava Beds National Monument

Highest point
- Elevation: 7,921 ft (2,414 m) NAVD 88
- Coordinates: 41°36′39″N 121°33′13″W

Geography
- Location: Siskiyou County, California, U.S.
- Parent range: Cascade Range
- Topo map: USGS Medicine Lake

Geology
- Rock age: About 500,000 years
- Mountain type: Shield volcano
- Volcanic arc: Cascade Volcanic Arc
- Last eruption: 1080 ± 25 years

Medicine Lake
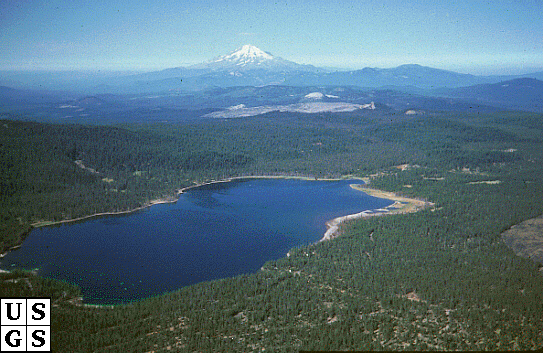
- The lake with Mount Shasta in the background

- Location within California

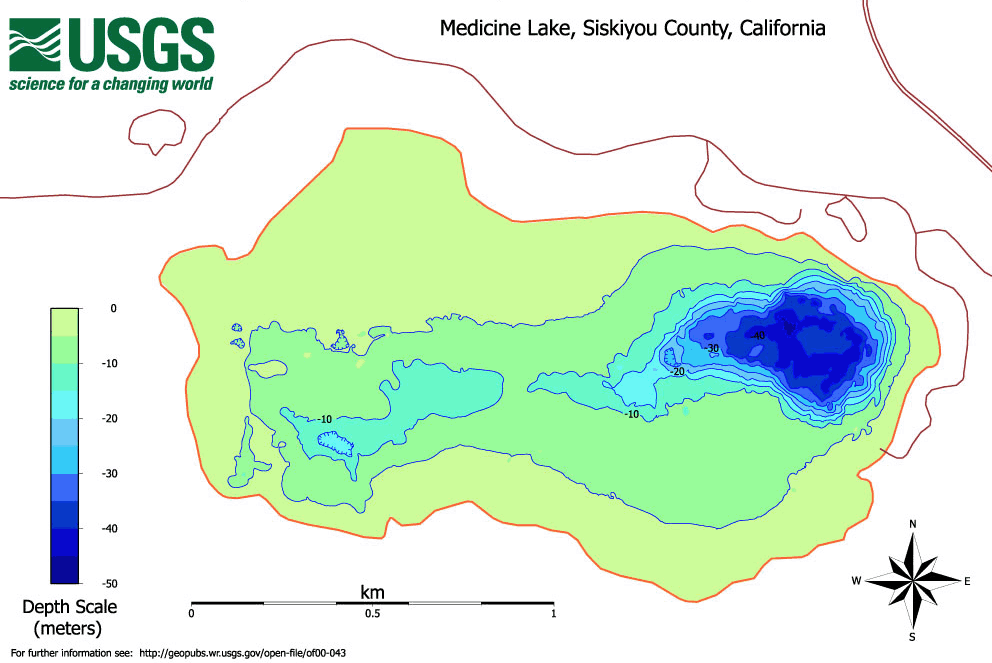
- Bathymetric map
- Location: California
- Coordinates: 41°34′54″N 121°35′56″W
- Basin countries: United States
- Max. length: 0.6 mi (1 km)
- Max. width: 1.2 mi (2 km)
- Surface area: 0.64 sq mi (1.65 km^{2})
- Average depth: 24.0 ft (7.3 m)
- Max. depth: 152 ft (46.4 m)
- Water volume: 470,000,000 cu ft (13,400,000 m^{3})
- Shore length^{1}: 20,384 ft (6,213 m)
- ^{1} Shore length is not a well-defined measure.

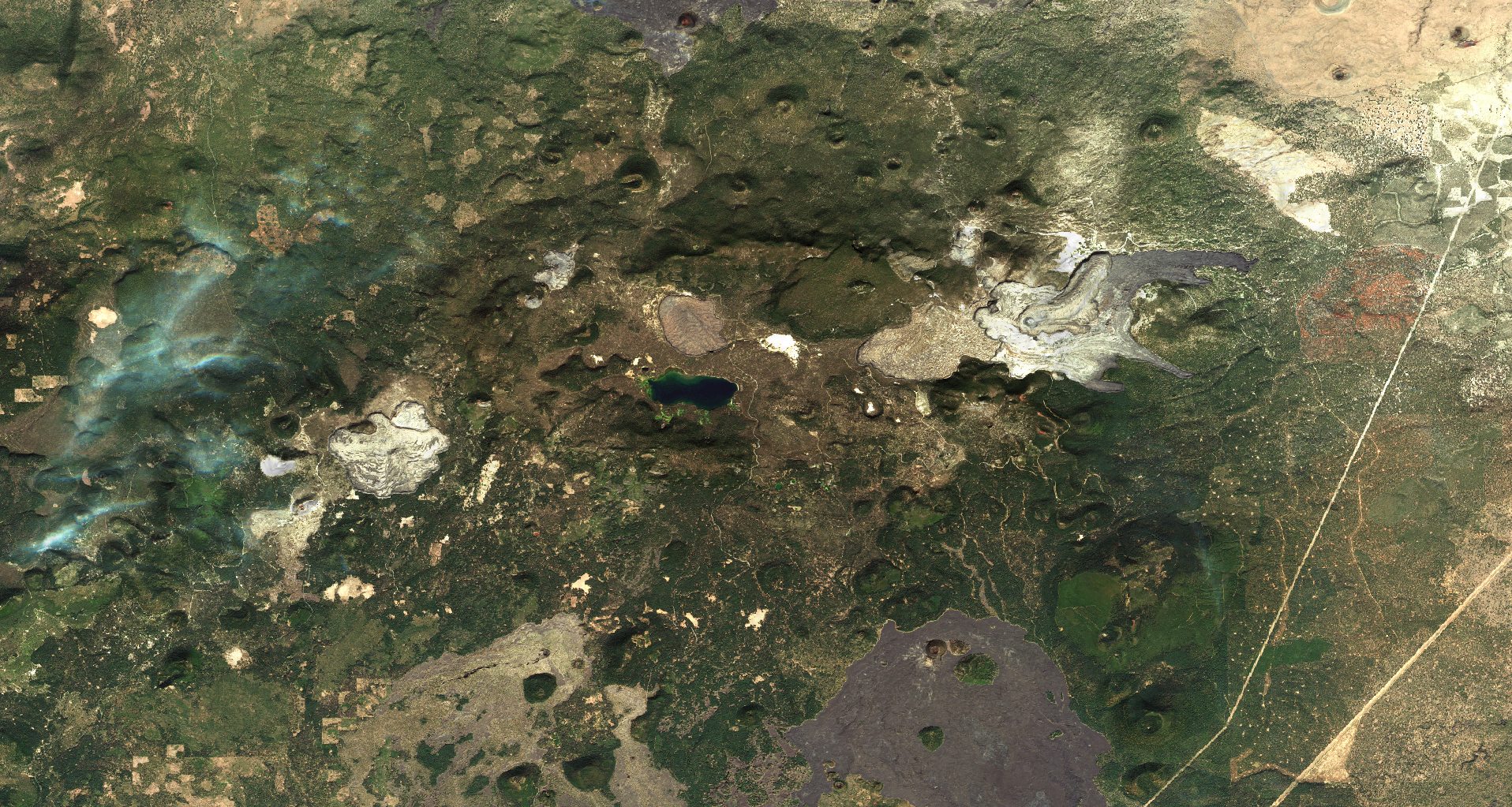
Medicine Lake Volcano, California, September 27, 2017. Sentinel-2 true-color satellite image, scale 1:50,000.

Medicine Lake Volcano is a large shield volcano in northeastern California about 30 mi (50 km) northeast of Mount Shasta. The volcano is located in a zone of east–west crustal extension east of the main axis of the Cascade Volcanic Arc and the Cascade Range. The 0.6 mi (1 km) thick shield is 30 mi (50 km) from east to west and 50 mi (80 km) from north to south, and covers more than 800 sq mi (2,200 km^{2}). The underlying rock has downwarped by 0.3 mi (0.5 km) under the center of the volcano. The volcano is primarily composed of basalt and basaltic andesite lava flows, and has a 4 by 7 mi (7 by 12 km) caldera at the center.

The Medicine Lake shield rises about 3,900 ft (1,200 m) above the Modoc Plateau to an elevation of 7,795 ft (2,376 m). Lavas from Medicine Lake Volcano are estimated to be at least 140 cu mi (600 km^{3}) in volume, making Medicine Lake the largest volcano by volume in the Cascade Range (Newberry Volcano in Oregon has the second largest volume). Lava Beds National Monument lies on the northeast flank of the volcano.

Medicine Lake Volcano has been active for 500,000 years. The eruptions were gentle rather than explosive like Mount St. Helens, coating the volcano's sides with flow after flow of basaltic lava. Medicine Lake is part of the old caldera, a bowl-shaped depression in the mountain. It is believed that the Medicine Lake volcano is unique, having many small magma chambers rather than one large one.

The Medicine Lake Highlands are largely managed by the United States Forest Service as part of Klamath, Shasta–Trinity, and Modoc National Forests. In 2025, President Joe Biden established Sáttítla Highlands National Monument to protect the area from development.

== Caldera ==
Medicine Lake is in the caldera of the volcano, which measures 4 by 7 mi (7 by 12 km). The caldera may have formed by collapse after a large volume of andesite was erupted from vents along the caldera rim. The distribution of late Pleistocene vents, mostly concentrated along the rim, suggests that ring faults already existed when most of the andesite erupted. No single large eruption has been related to caldera formation. The only eruption recognized to have produced ash flow tuff occurred in late Pleistocene time, and this eruption was too small to account for formation of the caldera. Later conclusions were that Medicine Lake caldera formed by collapse in response to repeated extrusions of mostly mafic lava beginning early in the history of the volcano (perhaps in a manner similar to the formation of Kilauea caldera in Hawaii). Several small differentiated magma bodies may have been fed by and interspersed among a network of dikes and sills. Late Holocene andesitic to rhyolitic lavas were derived by fractionation, assimilation, and mixing from high alumina basalt parental magma. The small lake from which Medicine Lake Volcano derives its name lies within the central caldera.

== Eruptive history ==
=== Early history ===
Medicine Lake Volcano began to grow about one million years ago in Pleistocene time, following the eruption of a large volume of tholeiitic high-alumina basalt. Similar high-alumina basalt has continued to erupt around the volcano throughout its history. Although mafic lavas predominate on the volcano's flanks, all lava compositions from basalt to rhyolite have erupted during Pleistocene time. The lower flanks consist of mostly basaltic and some andesitic lavas. Basalt is mostly absent at higher elevation, where andesite dominates and rhyolite and small volumes of dacite are present. During the past 11,000 years, eruptive activity at Medicine Lake Volcano has been episodic. Eight eruptions produced about 1.3 cu mi (5.3 km^{3}) of basaltic lava during a time interval of a few hundred years about 10,500 years ago. That eruptive episode was followed by a hiatus that ended with a small andesitic eruption about 4,300 years ago. During the most recent eruptive episode between 3000 and 900 years ago, eight eruptions produced approximately 0.6 cu mi (2.5 km^{3}) of lava ranging in composition from basalt to rhyolite. Late Holocene lava compositions include basalt and andesite, but silicic lavas dominate.

Eruptive activity during Holocene time has included numerous rhyolite and dacite lava flows erupted at high elevations inside and outside the caldera; cinder cones and associated lava flows of basalt and basaltic andesite have resulted from eruptions at vents on the flanks of the shield. Most vents are aligned along zones of crustal weakness that trend northeast to northwest.

=== Glass Mountain ===
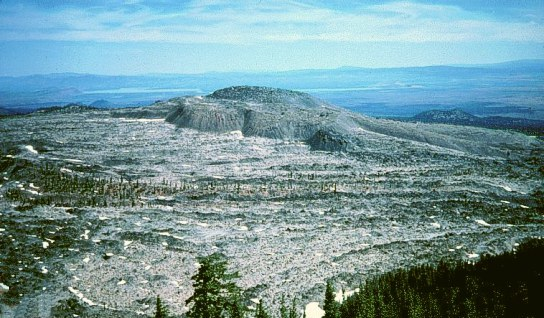
Glass Mountain from Medicine Lake caldera rim. USGS photo by Julie Donnelly-Nolan.

The most recent eruption occurred around 1,000 years ago when rhyolite and dacite erupted at Glass Mountain and associated vents near the caldera's eastern rim. Fitch cites reports that a light ash fall that occurred in 1910 may have come from a small eruption at Glass Mountain. No field evidence has been found to substantiate the 1910 eruption.

Glass Mountain consists of a spectacular, nearly treeless, steep-sided rhyolite and dacite obsidian flow that erupted just outside the eastern caldera rim and flowed down the steep eastern flank of Medicine Lake Volcano. Ten additional small domes of Glass Mountain rhyolite and rhyodacite lava lie on a N25degreesW trend to the north and one to the south. The age of Glass Mountain and its preceding pumice deposits has been a matter of discussion for some time. A radiocarbon dating age of 885±40 years before present (1990) was obtained on a dead incense-cedar tree without limbs or bark that is preserved in the edge of one of the distal tongues of the flow. The dated material consisted of a piece of exterior wood containing about 30 annual growth rings. This age may be too old, because some of the outside of the tree is missing. The tephra deposits that precede the flow and domes may be somewhat older but are constrained to be less than about 1,050 years before present (1990) by the Little Glass Mountain and Lassen Peak data.

== See also ==
- Volcanic Legacy Scenic Byway
