= Clear Lake Hills =

- Location within California

Highest point
- Elevation: 1,692 m (5,551 ft)

Geography
- Country: United States
- State: California
- District: Modoc County
- Range coordinates: 41°49′47.577″N 121°13′57.946″W
- Topo map: USGS Double Head Mountain

The Clear Lake Hills are a mountain range in Modoc County, California.
