= Bibliography of the American Civil War =

The bibliography of the American Civil War comprises books that deal in large part with the American Civil War. In 2001, historian Jonathan Sarna had estimated that there were over 50,000 books on the war, with 1,500 more appearing every year. Authors James Lincoln Collier and Christopher Collier stated in 2012, "No event in American history has been so thoroughly studied, not merely by historians, but by tens of thousands of other Americans who have made the war their hobby. Perhaps a hundred thousand books have been published about the Civil War."

There is no complete bibliography to the war; the largest guide to books is more than 50 years old and lists over 6,000 of the most valuable titles as evaluated by three leading scholars. Many specialized topics such as Abraham Lincoln, women, and medicine have their own lengthy bibliographies. The books on major campaigns typically contain their own specialized guides to the sources and literature. The most comprehensive guide to the historiography annotates over a thousand major titles, with an emphasis on military topics. The most recent guide to literary and non-military topics is A History of American Civil War Literature (2016) edited by Coleman Hutchison. It emphasizes cultural studies, memory, diaries, southern literary writings, and famous novelists.

== Causes of the war ==
- Ashworth, John. Slavery, Capitalism, and Politics in the Antebellum Republic. Cambridge, England and New York: Cambridge University Press, 1995.
- Ayers, Edward L. What Caused the Civil War? Reflections on the South and Southern History. New York: W. W. Norton, 2005.
- Boritt, Gabor S., ed. Why the Civil War Came. New York, Oxford: Oxford University Press, 1996. ISBN 978-0-19-511376-1.
- Broadwater, Robert P. Did Lincoln and the Republican Party Create the Civil War?: An Argument. Jefferson, North Carolina: McFarland & Company, Inc., 2008. ISBN 978-0786433612.
- Calore, Paul. The Causes of the Civil War: The Political, Cultural, Economic, and Territorial Disputes between North and South. Jefferson, North Carolina: McFarland & Co., 2008.
- Donald, David Herbert "An Excess of Democracy: The Civil War and the Social Process" in David Herbert Donald, Lincoln Reconsidered: Essays on the Civil War Era, 2d ed. New York: Alfred A. Knopf, 1966, pp. 209–235.
- Egnal, Marc. Clash of Extremes: The Economic Origins of the Civil War. New York: Hill and Wang, 2009.
- Freeman, Joanne B.. The Field of Blood: Violence in Congress and the Road to Civil War. New York: Picador, 2018.
- Grant, Susan-Mary. North Over South: Northern Nationalism and American Identity in the Antebellum Era. Lawrence: University Press of Kansas, 2000.
- Helper, Hinton Rowan. The Impending Crisis of the South: How to Meet It. New York: Burdock Brothers, 1857.
- Holt, Michael F. The Political Crisis of the 1850s. New York: Wiley, 1978.
- Levine, Bruce. Half Slave and Half Free: The Roots of the Civil War, New York: Hill and Wang, 1992; revised ed., New York: Hill and Wang, 2005.
- Link, William A. Roots of Secession: Slavery and Politics in Antebellum Virginia. Chapel Hill: University of North Carolina Press, 2003.
- Olsen, Christopher J. Political Culture and Secession in Mississippi: Masculinity, Honor, and the Antiparty Tradition, 1830–1860, 2000.
- Potter, David M. completed and edited by Don E. Fehrenbacher The Impending Crisis: America Before the Civil War, 1848 – 1861. New York: Harper Perennial, reprint 2011. First published New York, Harper Colophon, 1976. ISBN 978-0-06-131929-7.
- Schoen, Brian. The Fragile Fabric of Union: Cotton, Federal Politics, and the Global Origins of the Civil War. Baltimore, Maryland: Johns Hopkins University Press, 2009.
- Stampp, Kenneth M. America in 1857: A Nation on the Brink. New York and Oxford: Oxford University Press, 1990.

=== Secession ===
- Adams, Charles. When in the Course of Human Events: Arguing the Case for Southern Secession. Lanham, Maryland: Rowman & Littlefield, 2000.
- Bledose, Alfred T. Is Davis a Traitor; or Was Secession a Constitutional Right Previous to the War in 1861?. Baltimore, Maryland: Innes and the author, 1866.
- Dew, Charles B. Apostles of Disunion: Southern Secession Commissioners and the Causes of the Civil War. Charlottesville: University Press of Virginia, 2001.
- Mississippi Secession Convention. Journal of the State Convention and Ordinances and Resolution Adopted in January 1861, with an Appendix. Jackson, Mississippi: E. Barksdale, 1861.
- Potter, David M. Lincoln and His Party in the Secession Crisis. New Haven, Connecticut: Yale University Press. (1962) [1942].
- Sitterson, Joseph Carlyle. The Secession Movement in North Carolina. Chapel Hill: University of North Carolina Press, 1939.
- Stampp, Kenneth M. And the War Came: The North and the Secession Crisis, 1860–1861. 1950.
- Wakelyn, Jon L., editor. Southern Pamphlets on Secession, November 1860 – April 1861. Chapel Hill: University of North Carolina Press, 1996.

== Naval history ==
- Anderson, Bern. By Sea and By River: The Naval History of the Civil War. New York: Da Capo Press, 1989.
- Bennett, Michael J. Union Jacks: Yankee Sailors in the Civil War. Chapel Hill: University of North Carolina Press, 2004.
- Block, W.T. Schooner Sail to Starboard: The U.S. Navy vs. Blockade Runners in the Western Gulf of Mexico. College Station, Texas: Institute of Nautical Archaeology, 2007.
- Bradlee, Francis. Blockade Running During the Civil War. Salem, Massachusetts: Essex Institute Press, 1959.
- Browning, Jr., Robert M. From Cape Charles to Cape Fear: The North Atlantic Blockading Squadron During the Civil War. Tuscaloosa: University of Alabama Press, 1993. ISBN 978-0817306793.
- Browning, Jr., Robert M. Success Is All That Was Expected: The South Atlantic Blockading Squadron in the Civil War. Washington, D.C.: Brassey's Inc., 2002.
- Campbell, R. Thomas. Academy on the James: The Confederate Naval School. Shippensburg, Pennsylvania: Burd Street Press, 1998.
- Campbell, R. Thomas. Confederate Naval Forces on Western Waters: The Defense of the Mississippi River and Its Tributaries. Jefferson, North Carolina: McFarland & Co., 2005. ISBN 0786422033.
- —— Fire and Thunder: Exploits of the Confederate States Navy. Shippensburg, Pennsylvania: Burd Street Press, 1997. ISBN 1572490675.
- —— Gray Thunder: Exploits of the Confederate States Navy. Shippensburg, Pennsylvania: Burd Street Press, 1996. ISBN 0942597990.
- —— Southern Fire: Exploits of the Confederate States Navy. Shippensburg, Pennsylvania: Burd Street Press, 1997. ISBN 1572490462.
- Carr, Dawson. Gray Phantoms of the Cape Fear: Running the Civil War Blockade. Winston-Salem, North Carolina: John F. Blair, 1998. ISBN 978-0895872135.
- Carse, Robert. Blockade: The Civil War at Sea. New York: Rinehart & Co., 1950.
- Chaffin, Tom. The H. L. Hunley: The Secret Hope of the Confederacy. New York: Hill and Wang, 2008. ISBN 0809054604.
- Chatelain, Neil P. Defending the Arteries of Rebellion: Confederate Naval Operations in the Mississippi River Valley, 1861–1865. Savas Beatie, 2020. ISBN 978-1611215106.
- Coombe, Jack D. Gunfire Around the Gulf: The Last Major Naval Campaign of the Civil War. New York: Bantam Books, 1999.
- Cochran, Hamilton. Blockade Runners of the Confederacy. Indianapolis, Indiana: Bobbs-Merrill Co., 1957.
- Conrad, James Lee. Rebel Reefers: The Organization and Midshipmen of the Confederate States Naval Academy. New York: Da Capo Press, 2003.
- Coski, John M. Capital Navy: The Men, Ships, and Operations of the James River Squadron. Campbell, California: Savas Woodbury Publishers, 1996.
- Coski, John M. The Confederate Navy. Richmond, Virginia: The Museum of the Confederacy, 2005.
- Cracknell, William H. United States Navy Monitors of the Civil War Windsor, England: 1973.
- deKay, James T. Monitor. 1997.
- Donnelly, Ralph W. The Confederate States Marine Corps: The Rebel Leathernecks. Shippensburg, Pennsylvania: White Mane Publishing Company, Inc., 1989. ISBN 0942597133.
- Dougherty, Kevin J. Ships of the Civil War, 1861–1865: An Illustrated Guide to the Fighting Vessels of the Union and the Confederacy. London: Amber Books, Ltd., 2013. ISBN 978-1909160675.
- Dougherty, Kevin J. Strangling the Confederacy: Coastal Operations in the American Civil War. Savas Beatie, LLC, 2012. ISBN 978-1612000923.
- Ericson, Peter. Running the Batteries. LULU Press, 2009.
- Fowler, William M. Under Two Flags: The American Navy in the Civil War. Naval Institute Press, 1990.
- Gosnell, H. Allen. Guns on the Western Waters: The Story of River Gunboats in the Civil War Baton Rouge: Louisiana State University Press, 1949.
- Graham, Eric J. Clyde Built: Blockade Runners, Cruisers and Armoured Rams of the American Civil War. Edinburgh: Birlinn Press, 2006.
- Hall, Andrew W. Civil War Blockade Running on the Texas Coast. Charleston, South Carolina: The History Press, 2014. ISBN 978-1625850249.
- Hearn, Chester G. Gray Raiders of the Sea: How Eight Confederate Warships Destroyed the Union's High Seas Commerce. Camden, Maine: International Marine Publishing, 1992.
- Hoyt, Edwin P. The Voyage of the Hunley: The Chronicle of the Pathbreaking Confederate Submarine. Short Hills, New Jersey: Burford Books. ISBN 1580800947.
- Joiner, Gary D. Mr. Lincoln's Brown Water Navy: The Mississippi Squadron. Rowman & Littlefield, 2007.
- Jones, Virgil Carington. The Civil War At Sea. New York: Holt, Rinehart, Winston, 1962.
- Joyner, Elizabeth Hoxie and Margie Riddle Bearss. The USS Cairo: History and Artifacts of a Civil War Gunboat. Jefferson, North Carolina: McFarland & Co., 2006.
- Lardas, Mark. CSS Alabama vs. USS Kearsage: Cherbourg 1864. New York: Osprey, 2011. ISBN 978-1849084925.
- Luraghi, Raimondo. A History of the Confederate Navy. Annapolis, MD: Naval Institute Press, 1996. ISBN 978-1557505279.
- Merrill, James M. The Rebel Shore. 1957.
- Musicant, Ivan. Divided Waters: The Naval History of the Civil War. New York: HarperCollins Publishers, 1995. ISBN 0060164824.
- Page, Dave. Ships Versus Shore: Civil War Engagements Along Southern Shores and Rivers. Rutledge Hill Press, 1994.
- Porter, David Dixon. The Naval History of the Civil War. Secaucus, New Jersey: Castle, 1984.
- Ragan, Mark K. Union and Confederate Submarine Warfare in the Civil War. Campbell, California: Savas Publishing, 1999.
- Roberts, William H. Now for the Contest: Coastal and Oceanic Naval Operations in the Civil War. Lincoln: University of Nebraska Press, 2004.
- Scharf, J. Thomas (1887). History of the Confederate States Navy. New York: Rogers & Sherwood.
- Silverstone, Pal H. Warships of the Civil War Navies. Annapolis, Maryland: Naval Institute Press, 1989.
- Smith, Jr., Myron J. The Timberclads in the Civil War: The Lexington, Conestoga and Tyler on the Western Waters. Jefferson, North Carolina: McFarland Publishing, 2008. ISBN 978-0786435784.
- Smith, Jr., Myron J. Tinclads in the Civil War: Union Light–Draught Gunboat Operations on Western Waters, 1862–1865. Jefferson, North Carolina: McFarland & Company, 2009. ISBN 978-0786435791.
- Sprunt, James. Tales of the Cape Fear Blockade. Wilmington, North Carolina: Cornelius Thomas, 1960.
- Stern, Philip Van Doren (1962). The Confederate Navy. Doubleday & Company.
- Still, Jr., William. Confederate Shipbuilding. Columbia: University of South Carolina Press, 2003.
- Still Jr., William, John M. Taylor, and Norman C. Delaney. Raiders & Blockaders: The American Civil War Afloat. Washington, D.C.: Brassey's Inc., 1998. ISBN 1574881647.
- Sullivan, David M. The United States Marine Corps in the Civil War – The First Year. Shippensburg, Pennsylvania: White Mane Publishing Company, 1997. ISBN 1572490403.
- Sullivan, David M. The United States Marine Corps in the Civil War – The Second Year. Shippensburg, Pennsylvania: White Mane Publishing Company, 1997. ISBN 1572490551.
- Sullivan, David M. The United States Marine Corps in the Civil War – The Third Year. Shippensburg, Pennsylvania: White Mane Publishing Company, 1998. ISBN 1572490810.
- Sullivan, David M. The United States Marine Corps in the Civil War – The Fourth Year. Shippensburg, Pennsylvania: White Mane Publishing Company, 2000. ISBN 1572492147.
- Surdam, David G. Northern Naval Superiority and the Economics of the American Civil War. University of South Carolina Press, 2001.
- Symonds, Craig (2008). Lincoln and His Admirals: Abraham Lincoln, the U.S. Navy, and the Civil War. Oxford University Press.
- Taafe, Stephen R. Commanding Lincoln's Navy: Union Naval Leadership During the Civil War. Annapolis, Maryland: Naval Institute Press, 2009.
- Tucker, Spencer C., editor The Civil War Naval Encyclopedia, two volumes. Santa Barbara, California: ABC–CLIO, 2011. ISBN 978-1598843385.
- Tucker, Spencer C. A Short History of the Civil War at Sea. Wilmington, Delaware: SR Books, 2001.
- Underwood, Rodman L. Waters of Discord: The Union Blockade of Texas During the Civil War. Jefferson, North Carolina: McFarland & Co., 2003.
- U.S. Department of the Navy, Naval History Division, compiler. Civil War Naval Chronology 1861–1865. Washington, D.C.: Government Printing Office, 1971.
- Van Tillburg, Hans. A Civil War Gunboat in Pacific Waters: Life on Board the USS Saginaw. Gainesville: University Press of Florida, 2010. ISBN 978-0813035161.
- Walker, Sally M. Secrets of A Civil War Submarine: Solving the Mysteries of the H.L. Hunley. Minneapolis, Minnesota: Carolrhoda Books, Inc., 2005.
- Wise, Stephen R. Lifeline of the Confederacy: Blockade Running During the Civil War. Columbia: University of South Carolina Press, 1988.
- Wynne, Nick and Joe Crankshaw. Florida Civil War Blockades: Battling for the Coast. Charleston, South Carolina: The History Press, 2011. ISBN 978-1609493400.

=== Ironclads ===
- Bearss, Edwin C. Hardluck Ironclad: The Sinking and Salvage of the Cairo. Baton Rouge: Louisiana State University Press, 1966.
- Besse, Summer B. The C.S. Ironclad Virginia: With Data and References for a Scale Model. Newport News, Virginia, 1937.
- Elliott, Robert G. Ironclad of the Roanoke: Gilbert Elliott's Albemarle. Shippensburg, Pennsylvania: White Mane Publishing Co., 1994.
- Field, Ron. Confederate Ironclad vs. Union Ironclad: Hampton Roads 1862. United Kingdom: Osprey Publishing, 2008.
- Holzer, Harold and Mulligan, Tim, ed. The Battle of Hampton Roads: New Perspectives on the USS Monitor and CSS Virginia. Fordham University Press, 2006.
- MacBride, Robert. Civil War Ironclads: The Dawn of Naval Armor. Philadelphia: 1962.
- Melton, Maurice. The Confederate Ironclads. South Brunswick, New Jersey: Thomas Yoseloff Ltd., 1968. OCLC 559832629
- Mindell, David A. War, Technology, and Experience Aboard the U.S.S. Monitor. 2000.
- Mokion, Arthur. Ironclad: The Monitor & the Merrimack. Novato, California: Presidio Press, 1991. ISBN 0891414053.
- Nelson, James L. Reign of Iron: The Story of the First Battling Ironclads, the Monitor and the Merrimack. William Marrow, 2004.
- Quarstein, John. C.S.S. Virginia: Mistress of Hampton Roads. Lynchburg, Virginia: H.E. Howard, Inc., 2000.
- Quarstein, John V. The Monitor Boys: The Crew of the Union's First Ironclad. Charleston, South Carolina: The History Press, 2011. ISBN 978-1596294554
- Quarstein, John V. The CSS Virginia: Sink Before Surrender. Charleston, South Carolina: The History Press, 2012. ISBN 978-1609495800.
- Quarstein, John V. A History of Ironclads. Charleston, South Carolina: History Press, 2006.
- Roberts, William H. Civil War Ironclads: The U.S. Navy and Industrial Mobilization. Baltimore, Maryland: The Johns Hopkins University Press, 2003.
- Smith, Jr., Myron J. The CSS Arkansas: A Confederate Ironclad on Western Waters. Jefferson, North Carolina: McFarland & Company, Inc., 2011. ISBN 978-0786447268.
- Smith, Jr., Myron J. The USS Carondelet: A Civil War Ironclad in Western Waters. Jefferson, North Carolina: McFarland, 2010.
- Still, Jr., William N. Iron Afloat: The Story of the Confederate Armorclads. Columbia,

University of South Carolina Press, 1985, 1988. ISBN 978-0872496163. Originally published Nashville, TN: Vanderbilt University Press, 1971.

=== Confederate raiders ===
- Baldwin, John, and Ron Powers. Last Flag Down: The Epic Journey of the Last Confederate Warship. New York: Crown Publishers, 2007. ISBN 978-0307236555.
- Chaffin, Tom. Sea of Gray: The Around–the–World Odyssey of the Confederate Raider Shenandoah. New York: Hill & Wang, 2006. ISBN 978-0809095117.
- De Kay, James T. The Rebel Raiders: The Astonishing History of the Confederacy's Secret Navy. New York: Ballantine Books, 2002.
- Morgan, Murray. Confederate Raider in the North Pacific: The Saga of the C.S.S. Shenandoah, 1864–65. Washington State University Press, 1948.
- Robinson III, Charles M. Shark of the Confederacy: The Story of the CSS Alabama. Annapolis, Maryland: Naval Institute Press, 1995. ISBN 1557507287.
- Schooler, Lynn. The Last Shot: The Incredible Story of the C.S.S. Shenandoah and the True Conclusion of the American Civil War. New York: HarperCollins, 2005. ISBN 0060523336.
- Whittle, William C. The Voyage of the CSS Shenandoah: A Memorable Cruise. Tuscaloosa: University of Alabama Press, 2005.

== Unit histories ==
- Brown, J. Willard. The Signal Corps in the War of the Rebellion. Boston: U.S. Veteran Signal Corps Association, 1896.
- Glatthaar, Joseph T. Soldiering in the Army of Northern Virginia: A Statistical Portrait of the Troops Who Served Under Robert E. Lee. Chapel Hill: University of North Carolina Press, 2011. ISBN 978-0807834923.
- Tennesseans in the Civil War: A Military History of Confederate and Union Units with Available Rosters of Personnel, two volumes. Nashville, Tennessee: Civil War Centennial Commission, 1964.
- Williams, George Forrester (1883). Bullet and shell : war as the soldier saw it; camp, march, and picket; battlefield and bivouac; prison and hospital. New York: Fords, Howard, & Hulbert.

== Strategy and command ==
- Adams, Michael C.C. Our Masters the Rebels: A Speculation on Union Military Failure in the East, 1861–1865. Cambridge, Massachusetts: Harvard University Press, 1978.
- Bartholomes, Jr., J. Boone Buff. Facings and Gilt Buttons: Staff and Headquarters Operations in the Army of Northern Virginia, 1861–1865. Columbia: University of South Carolina Press, 1998.
- Bledsoe, Andrew S. Citizen-Officers: The Union and Confederate Volunteer Junior Officer Corps in the American Civil War. Baton Rouge: Louisiana State University Press, 2015. ISBN 978-0807160701.
- Burne, Alfred H. Lee, Grant and Sherman: A Study in Leadership in the 1864–1865 Campaign. Aldershot: Gale and Polden, 1938.
- Davis, William C. Crucible of Command: Ulysses S. Grant and Robert E. Lee – The War They Fought, The Peace They Forged. Boston: Da Capo Press, 2014. ISBN 978-0306822452.
- Fredricksbon, George M. Why the Confederacy Did Not Fight a Guerrilla War after the Fall of Richmond: A Comparative View. Gettysburg, Pennsylvania: Gettysburg College, 1996.
- Hagerman, Edward. The American Civil War and the Origins of Modern Warfare: Ideas, Organization and Field Command. Bloomington: Indiana University Press, 1988.
- Harsh, Joseph L. Confederate Tide Rising: Robert E. Lee and the Making of Southern Strategy, 1861–1862. Kent, Ohio: Kent State University Press, 1998. ISBN 0873385802.
- Hess, Earl J. Field Armies and Fortifications in the Civil War: The Eastern Campaigns, 1861–1864. Chapel Hill: University of North Carolina Press, 2005.
- Jones, Archer. Civil War Command and Strategy: The Process of Victory and Defeat. New York: The Free Press, 1992.
- Jones, Edward C. The Right Hand of Command: Use and Disuse of Personal Staff in the American Civil War. Mechanicsburg, Pennsylvania: Stackpole Books, 2000.
- Marszalek, John F. (2007). Sherman: A Soldier's Passion for Order. SIU Press. ISBN 978-0809327850.
- McPherson, Robertson, Sears, Symonds, Waugh. Hearts Touched by Fire, The Modern Library, New York, 2011
- Gallagher, Gary W.; and Joseph T. Glatthaar. Leaders of the Lost Cause: New Perspectives on the Confederate High Command, 2004.
- Silkenat, David. Raising the White Flag: How Surrender Defined the American Civil War. Chapel Hill: University of North Carolina Press, 2019. ISBN 978-1469649726.
- Smith, Jean Edward (2001). Grant. New York: Simon & Schuster. ISBN 0684849275.
- Stoker, Donald. The Grand Design: Strategy and the U.S. Civil War (Oxford UP. 2010) excerpt
- Tanner, Robert G. Retreat to Victory?: Confederate Strategy Reconsidered. Wilmington, Delaware: Scholarly Resources Inc., 2001.
- Vandiver, Frank E. Rebel Brass: The Confederate Command System. New York: 1956.
- Winkler, H. Donald. Civil War Goats and Scapegoats. Cumberland House, 2008.
- Wood, W.J. Civil War Generalship: The Art of Command. Westport, Connecticut: Praeger, 1997. ISBN 0275950549.
- Woodworth, Steven E., ed. Civil War Generals in Defeat. Lawrence: University Press of Kansas, 1999. ISBN 0700609431.
- Woodworth, Steven E., ed. Leadership and Command in the American Civil War. New York: Da Capo, 1996.

== Technology, weapons, logistics ==
- Albaugh III, William A. Confederate Edged Weapons. New York: 1960.
- Albaugh, William A., Hugh Benet, Jr., and Edward Simmons. Confederate Handguns.
- Albert, Alphaeus H. Buttons of the Confederacy.
- Army Jr., Thomas F. Engineering Victory: How Technology Won the Civil War (Johns Hopkins Studies in the History of Technology, 2016).
- Bilby, Joseph G. Civil War Firearms: Their Historical Background, Tactical Use and Modern Collecting and Shooting. Conshocken, Pennsylvania: Combined Books, Inc.
- Bilby, Joseph G. A Revolution in Arms: A History of the First Repeating Rifles. Westholme, 2006.
- Black, III, Robert C. The Railroads of the Confederacy. Chapel Hill, North Carolina: University of North Carolina Press, 1952.
- Bragg, C.L., Charles D. Ross, Gordon A. Baker, Stephanie A.T. Jacobe, and Theodore P. Savas, eds. Never for Want of Powder: The Confederate Powder Works in Augusta, Georgia. Columbia, South Carolina: University of South Carolina Press, 2007.
- Bruce, Robert V. Lincoln and the Tools of War 1956.
- Burke, James C. The Wilmington & Weldon Railroad in the Civil War. Jefferson, North Carolina: McFarland & Company, Inc., 2013. ISBN 978-0786471546.
- Clark, John E. Railroads in the Civil War: The Impact of Management On Victory And Defeat. Baton Rouge: Louisiana State University Press, 2004.
- Coates, Earl J. and Dean S. Thomas. An Introduction To Civil War Small Arms. Gettysburg, Pennsylvania: Thomas Publications, 1990.
- Coggins, Jack. Arms and Equipment of the Civil War. Garden City, New York: Doubleday & Co., Inc., 1962.
- Cornish, Joseph Jenkins. The Air Arm of the Confederacy: A history of origins and usages of war balloons by the Southern Armies during the American Civil War. Richmond, Virginia: Richmond Civil War Centennial Committee, 1963.
- Davis, Carl L. Arming the Union: Small Arms in the Union Army. Port Washington, New York: Kennikat Press, Inc., 1974.
- Edwards, William B. Civil War Guns. New York: 1962.
- Griffith, Paddy. Battle Tactics of the Civil War. Yale University Press, 1989. ISBN 0300084617.
- Field, Ron. Brassey's History of Uniforms: American Civil War, Confederate Army. McLean, Virginia: Brassey's Inc., 1997.
- Hagerman, Edward. The American Civil War and the Origins of Modern Warfare: Ideas, Organization, and Field Command. Bloomington: Indiana University Press, 1988.
- Hazlett, James C.; Olmstead, Edwin; and Parks, M. Hume. Field Artillery Weapons of the Civil War. University of Illinois Press, 2004.
- Hess, Earl J. Civil War Logistics: A Study of Military Transportation (2017) online review
- Hess, Earl J. Field Armies and Fortification in the Civil War: The Eastern Campaigns, 1861–1864. Chapel Hill: University of North Carolina Press, 2005.
- Hess, Earl J. Grant and Lee: Field Fortifications in the Overland Campaign. Chapel Hill: University of North Carolina Press, 2007. ISBN 978-0807831540.
- Hess, Earl J. In the Trenches at Petersburg: Field Fortifications & Confederate Defeat. Chapel Hill: University of North Carolina Press, 2009. ISBN 978-0807832820.
- Hess, Earl J. The Rifle Musket in Civil War Combat. Lawrence, Kansas: University Press of Kansas, 2009.
- Hodges, Jr., Robert R. American Civil War Railroad Tactics. United Kingdom: Osprey Publishing, 2009.
- Johnston II, Angus James. Virginia Railroads in the Civil War. Chapel Hill: University of North Carolina Press, 1961.
- Keim, Lon W. Confederate General Service Accoutrement Plates.
- Kerksis, Sydney C. Field Artillery Projectiles of the Civil War, 1861–1865.
- Kerksis, Sydney C. Heavy Artillery Projectiles of the Civil War, 1861–1865.
- Madaus, H. Michael and Robert D. Needham. Battleflags of the Confederate Army of the Tennessee.
- Maier, Larry B. and Joseph W. Stahl. Identification Discs in the Civil War. Jefferson, North Carolina: McFarland & Co., Inc., 2008.
- McKee, W. Reid and M.W. Mason, Jr. Civil War Projectiles, Small Arms and Field Artillery.
- Morton, John W. The Artillery of Nathan Bedford Forrest's Cavalry "The Wizard of the Saddle". Nashville, Tennessee: Publishing House of the M.E. Church, South, 1909.
- Murphy, John M. Confederate Carbines and Musketoons.
- Naisawald, L. VanLoan. Canon Blasts: Civil War Artillery in the Eastern Armies. Shippensburg, Pennsylvania: White Mane, 2004.
- Perry, Milton F. Infernal Machines: The Story of Confederate Submarine and Mine Warfare. Baton Rouge: Louisiana State University Press, 1965.
- Philips, Stanley S. Bullets Used in the Civil War, 1861–1865.
- Philips, Stanley S. Civil War Corps Badges and Other Related Awards, Badges, Medals of the Period.
- Pitman, John. Breech Loading Carbines of the United States Civil War Period.
- Plum, William R. The Military Telegraph During the Civil War in the United States, an Exposition of ancient and Modern Means of Communications, and of the Federal and Confederate Cipher Systems, Also a Running Account of the War between the States, two volumes. Chicago: Jensen, McClug & Company, Publishers, 1882.
- Reilly, Robert M. United States Military Small Arms 1816–1865.
- Riling, Ray, ed. Uniforms and Dress of the Army and Navy of the Confederate States.
- Ripley, Warren. Artillery and Ammunition of the Civil War.
- Ross, Charles D. Trial by Fire: Science, Technology and the Civil War. Shippensburg, Pennsylvania: White Mane Publishing, 2000.
- Rutherford, Kenneth R. America’s Buried History: Landmines in the Civil War. Savas Beatie, 2020. ISBN 978-1611214536.
- Smith, Robin. Brassey's History of Uniforms: American Civil War, Union Army. McLean, Virginia: Brassey's Inc., 1997.
- Stamatelos, James. Notes on the Uniforms and Equipments of the United States Cavalry, 1861–1865.
- Summers, Festus P. The Baltimore and Ohio in the Civil War. New York: G. P. Putnam's Sons, 1939.
- Tucker, Spencer. Arming the Fleet. U.S. Ordnance in the Muzzle-Loading Era (1988)
- Turner, George Edgar. Victory Rode the Rails: The Strategic Place of the Railroads in the Civil War. New York: Bobbs Merrill, 1963.
- Wilson, Harold S. Confederate Industry, Manufacturers and Quartermasters in the Civil War. Jackson: University Press of Mississippi, 2002.
- Winey, Michael J. Union Army Uniforms at Gettysburg. Gettysburg, Pennsylvania: Thomas, 1998.
- Wise, Arthur and Francis A. Lord. Uniforms of the Civil War.
- Woodhead, Henry, ed. Echoes of Glory: Arms and Equipment of the Confederacy. Alexandria, Virginia: Time-Life Books, 1991.
- Woodhead, Henry, ed. Echoes of Glory: Arms and Equipment of the Union. Alexandria, Virginia: Time-Life Books, 1991.

== Reconstruction ==
- See Reconstruction: Bibliography for complete guide

== Medical ==
- Adams, George Worthington. Doctors in Blue: The Medical History of the Union Army in the Civil War. New York: Henry Schuman, 1952.
- Bell, Andrew McIlwaine. Mosquito Soldiers: Malaria, Yellow Fever, and the Course of the Civil War. Baton Rouge: Louisiana State University Press, 2010.
- Cunningham, Horace Herndon. Doctors in Gray: The Confederate Medical Service. (reprint Peter Smith, 1970)
- Downs, Jim. Sick from Freedom: African-American Illness and Suffering during the Civil War and Reconstruction. (Oxford University Press, 2012)
- Duncan, Louis C. The Medical Department of the United States Army in the Civil War. Gaithersburg, Maryland: Olde Soldiers Books, 1987.
- Flannery, Michael A. Civil War Pharmacy: A History of Drugs, Drug Supply and Provision, and Therapeutics for the Union and Confederacy. London: Pharmaceutical Press, 2004.
- Freemon, Frank R. Gangrene and Glory: Medical Care during the American Civil War. University of Illinois Press, 2001. ISBN 978-0252070105
- Green, Carol C. Chimborazo: The Confederacy's Largest Hospital. University of Tennessee Press, 2004.
- Grzyb, Frank L. Rhode Island's Civil War Hospital: Life and Death at Portsmouth Grove, 1862–1865. Jefferson, North Carolina: McFarland, 2012. ISBN 978-0786468614.
- Hilde, Libra R. Worth a Dozen Men: Women and Nursing in the Civil War South. University of Virginia Press, 2012. ISBN 978-0813932125.
- Humphreys, Margaret. Intensely Human: The Health of the Black Soldier in the American Civil War. Baltimore, Maryland: Johns Hopkins University Press, 2008.
- Humphreys, Margaret. Marrow of Tragedy: The Health Crisis of the American Civil War. Baltimore, Maryland: Johns Hopkins University Press; 2013.
- Lande, R. Gregory. Madness, Malingering, and Malfeasance: The Transformation of Psychiatry and the Law in the Civil War Era. Washington, D.C.: Brassey's, 2003.
- McGaugh, Scott. Surgeon in Blue: Jonathan Letterman, The Civil War Doctor Who Pioneered Battlefield Care. Arcade Publishing, 2013. ISBN 978-1611458398.
- Miller, Brian Craig. Empty Sleeves: Amputation in the Civil War South (University of Georgia Press, 2015). xviii, 257 pp.
- Patterson, Gerard A. Debris of Battle: The Wounded of Gettysburg. Mechanicsburg, PA: Stackpole Books, 1997. ISBN 081170498X.
- Robertson, James I (ed). The Medical and Surgical History of the War of the Rebellion, seven volumes. Wilmington, North Carolina: Broadfoot Publishing Co, 1990–1992 reprint.
- Rutkow, Ira M. Bleeding Blue and Gray: Civil War Surgery and the Evolution of American Medicine. New York: Random House, 2005.
- Schmidt, James M. and Guy R. Hasegawa, eds. Years of Change and Suffering: Modern Perspectives on Civil War Medicine. Edenborough Press, 2009.
- Schroeder–Lein, Glenna R. The Encyclopedia of Civil War Medicine. Armonk, New York: M.E. Sharpe, 2012.
- Schroeder–Lein, Glenna R. Confederate Hospitals on the Move: Samuel H. Stout and the Army of Tennessee. Columbia: University of South Carolina Press, 1994.
- Schultz, Jane E. Women at the Front: Hospital Workers in Civil War America. Chapel Hill: University of North Carolina Press, 2004.
- Steiner, Paul E. Disease in the Civil War: Natural Biological Warfare in 1861–1865. Springfield, Illinois: Charles C. Thomas, 1968.
- Welsh, Jack D. Medical Histories of Confederate Generals. Kent, Ohio: Kent State University Press, 1995.
- Welsh, Jack D. Medical Histories of Union Generals. Kent, Ohio: Kent State University Press, 1997.

=== Primary sources ===
- Barnes, Joseph H. et al., eds. The Medical and Surgical History of the War of the Rebellion, 1861–1865, 6 vols. Washington: U.S. Government Printing Office, 1870–88.
- Child, William. Letters from a Civil War Surgeon: The Letters of Dr. William Child of the Fifth New Hampshire Volunteers. Solon, Maine: Polar Bear and Company, 2001.
- Holland, Mary Gardner, ed. Our Army Nurses: Stories from Women in the Civil War (1895) excerpts
- McQuade, Tonya. A State Divided: The Civil War Letters of James Calaway Hale and Benjamin Petree of Andrew County, Missouri, 1862-1865. San Jose: McQuade Publishing, 2024.
- Josyph, Peter ed. The Wounded River: The Civil War Letters of John Vance Lauderdale, M.D. East Lansing: Michigan State University Press, 1993.
- Quinn, E. Moore. "'I have been trying very hard to be powerful "nice"': the correspondence of Sister M. De Sales (Brennan) during the American Civil War," Irish Studies Review (2010) 18#2 pp 213–233, for letters from a Catholic nun who was in charge of a Confederate hospital
- Gemrig's illustrated catalogue of surgical instruments, ca 1868
- Robertson Hospital Register, Statistical data on 1,329 patients. VCU Libraries Digital Collections.
- Sanger Historical Files (1859–1865), Excerpts, Includes letters, reports, and hospital records of the Medical College of Virginia during the American Civil War. VCU Libraries Digital Collections.
- Welsh, Jack D. Two Confederate Hospitals and Their Patients, Atlanta to Opelika (Mercer University Press, 2005) 183 pp. and CDROM; statistical data on 18,000 patients

== Constitutional and legal ==
- Belz, Herman. Abraham Lincoln, Constitutionalism, and Equal Rights in the Civil War Era. Fordham University Press, 1998.
- Carnahan, Burrus M. Act of Justice: Lincoln's Emancipation Proclamation and the Law of War. The University Press of Kentucky, 2007.
- Carnahan, Burrus M. Lincoln on Trial: Southern Civilians and the Law of War. The University Press of Kentucky, 2010.
- Edwards, Laura F. A Legal History of the Civil War and Reconstruction: A Nation of Rights. Cambridge University Press, 2015.
- Farber, Daniel. Lincoln's Constitution. The University of Chicago Press, 2003.
- Hyman, Harold. "A More Perfect Union": The Impact of the Civil War and Reconstruction on the Constitution. Houghton Mifflin, 1975.
- McCurry, Stephanie. "Enemy Women and the Laws of War in the American Civil War", Law & History Review (August 2017). pp. 667–710 doi:10.1017/s0738248017000244.
- McGinty, Brian. Lincoln and the Court. Harvard University Press, 2008.
- Moreno, Paul D. and O'Neill, Johnathan, eds. Constitutionalism in the Approach and Aftermath of the Civil War. Fordham University Press, 2013.
- Neely, Jr., Mark E. The Fate of Liberty: Abraham Lincoln and Civil Liberties. Oxford University Press, 1991.
- Neely, Jr., Mark E. Lincoln and the Triumph of the Nation: Constitutional Conflict in the American Civil War. Chapel Hill, North Carolina: University of North Carolina Press, 2011.
- Paludan, Phillip S. "The American Civil War Considered as a Crisis in Law and Order," American Historical Review, Vol. 77, No. 4 (Oct., 1972), pp. 1013–1034 in JSTOR
- Paludan, Phillip S. Covenant with Death: The Constitution, Law, and Equality in the Civil War Era. University of Illinois Press, 1975.
- Randall, James G. Constitutional Problems under Lincoln. University of Illinois Press, 1951 [1926].
- Witt, John Fabian. Lincoln's Code: The Laws of War in American History. Free Press, 2012.

== Slavery and emancipation ==
- Belz, Herman. Emancipation and Equal Rights: Politics and Constitutionalism in the Civil War Era (1978)
- Biddle, Daniel R., and Murray Dubin. "'God Is Settling the Account': African American Reaction to Lincoln's Emancipation Proclamation", Pennsylvania Magazine of History and Biography (Jan. 2013) 137#1 57–78.
- Blair, William A., and Younger, Karen Fisher, eds. Lincoln's Proclamation: Emancipation Reconsidered. Chapel Hill: The University of North Carolina Press, 2009.
- Blight, David W. A Slave No More: Two Men Who Escaped to Freedom: Including Their Own Narratives of Emancipation. Orlando: Harcourt, 2007.
- Chambers Jr., Henry L. "Lincoln, the Emancipation Proclamation, and Executive Power." Maryland Law Review 73 (2013): 100+ online
- Durden, Robert Franklin. The Gray and the Black: The Confederate Debate on Emancipation. Baton Rouge: Louisiana State University Press, 1972.
- Fehrenbacher, Don Edward. The Dred Scott Case: Its Significance in American Law and Politics, New York: Oxford University Press, 1978.
- Foner, Eric. The Fiery Trial: Abraham Lincoln and American Slavery. New York: W. W. Norton & Co., 2011.
- Guelzo, Allen C. Lincoln's Emancipation Proclamation: The End of Slavery in American. New York: Simon & Schuster, 2004.
- Harrold, Stanley. Border War: Fighting Over Slavery Before the Civil War. Chapel Hill: The University of North Carolina Press, 2010.
- Harold Holzer, Edna Greene Medford, and Frank J. Williams. The Emancipation Proclamation: Three Views (2006)
- Huston, James L. Calculating the Value of the Union: Slavery, Property Rights, and the Economic Origins of the Civil War. Chapel Hill: The University of North Carolina Press, 2003.
- Lightner, David L. Slavery and the Commerce Power: How the Struggle against the Interstate Slave Trade Led to the Civil War. New Haven: Yale University Press, 2006.
- Masur, Louis P. Lincoln's Hundred Days: The Emancipation Proclamation and the War for the Union. Harvard University Press, 2012.
- Nevins, Allan. Ordeal of the Union: War Becomes Revolution, 1862–1863. Scribner, 1959.
- Mitchell, Charles W., ed. Maryland Voices of the Civil War. The Johns Hopkins University Press, 2007.
- Mohr, Clarence L. On the Threshold of Freedom: Masters and Slaves in Civil War Georgia. Athens: University of Georgia Press, 1986.
- Morrison, Michael A. Slavery and the American West: The Eclipse of Manifest Destiny and the Coming of the Civil War. Chapel Hill: The University of North Carolina Press, 1997.
- Oakes, James. The Radical and the Republican: Frederick Douglass, Abraham Lincoln, and the Triumph of Antislavery Politics. New York: W. W. Norton, 2007.
- Oakes, James. Freedom National: The Destruction of Slavery in the United States, 1861–1865. New York: W. W. Norton, 2013.
- Reynolds, David S. Mightier Than the Sword: Uncle Tom's Cabin and the Battle for America. New York: W. W. Norton & Company, 2011.
- Russo, Peggy A. and Finkelman, Paul, eds. Terrible Swift Sword: The Legacy of John Brown. Ohio University Press, 2005.
- Siddali, Silvana R. From Property to Person: Slavery and the Confiscation Acts, 1861–1862. LSU Press, 2005.
- Trefousse, Hans L., edited by Harold M. Hyman. Lincoln's Decision for Emancipation. J. B. Lippincott Company, 1975.
- Vorenberg, Michael. Final Freedom: The Civil War, the Abolition of Slavery, and the Thirteenth Amendment (2001)
- Vorenberg, Michael, ed. The Emancipation Proclamation: A Brief History with Documents (2010), primary and secondary sources

== International affairs ==
- American Civil Wars: A Bibliography. A comprehensive bibliography of the United States Civil War's international entanglements and parallel civil strife in the Americas in the 1860s.
- Adams, Ephraim D. Great Britain and the American Civil War (2 vols. 1925).
- Bennett, John D. The London Confederates: The Officials, Clergy, Businessmen and Journalists Who Backed the American South During the Civil War. McFarland, 2012. ISBN 978-0786469017.
- Blackett, R. J. M. Divided Hearts: Britain and the American Civil War (2001).
- Blumenthal, Henry. "Confederate Diplomacy: Popular Notions and International Realities," Journal of Southern History, Vol. 32, No. 2 (May 1966), pp. 151–171 in JSTOR
- Boyko, John. Blood and Daring: How Canada Fought the American Civil War and Forged a Nation. New York: Alfred A. Knopf, 2013. ISBN 978-0307361448.
- Campbell, Duncan Andrew. English Public Opinion and the American Civil War (2003).
- Carwardine, Richard, and Sexton, Jay, eds. The Global Lincoln. Oxford University Press, 2011.
- Case, Lynn Marshall. The United States and France: Civil War Diplomacy. University of Pennsylvania Press, 1970.
- Daddysman, James W. The Matamoros Trade: Confederate Commerce, Diplomacy, and Intrigue. Newark: University of Delaware Press, 1984.
- Doyle, Don H. The Cause of All Nations: An International History of the American Civil War. New York: Basic Books, 2014. Excerpt and text search
- Ellison, Mary. Support for Secession: Lancashire and the American Civil War. Chicago: University of Chicago Press, 1972.
- Ferris, Norman B. Desperate Diplomacy: William H. Seward's Foreign Policy, 1861. Knoxville: University of Tennessee Press, 1976.
- Foreman, Amanda. A World on Fire: Britain's Crucial Role in the American Civil War. New York: Random House, 2011. ISBN 978-0375504945.
- Fry, Joseph A. Lincoln, Seward, and US Foreign Relations in the Civil War. The University Press of Kentucky, 2019.
- Hubbard, Charles M. The Burden of Confederate Diplomacy. Knoxville, Tennessee: University of Tennessee Press, 1998. ISBN 1572330929.
- Hyman, Harold Melvin. Heard Round the World: The Impact Abroad of the Civil War. New York: Knopf, 1969.
- Jenkins, Brian. Britain & the War for the Union. Montreal: McGill-Queen's University Press, 1974.
- Jones, Howard. Blue & Gray Diplomacy: A History of Union and Confederate Foreign Relations. The University of North Carolina Press, 2010. erate online]
- Jones, Howard. Union in Peril: The Crisis over British Intervention in the Civil War. The University of North Carolina Press, 1992.
- Jones, Howard. Abraham Lincoln and a New Birth of Freedom: The Union and Slavery in the Diplomacy of the Civil War. Lincoln: University of Nebraska Press, 1999. ISBN 0803225822.
- Mahin, Dean B. One War at a Time: The International Dimensions of the American Civil War. Washington, D.C.: Brassey's, 2000. ISBN 978-1574883015. Originally published: Washington, DC: Brassey's, 1999.
- Mahin, Dean B. The Blessed Place of Freedom: Europeans in Civil War America. Washington, D.C.: Brassey's, 2002. ISBN 1574884840.
- May, Robert E., ed. The Union, the Confederacy, and the Atlantic Rim. Rev. ed. Gainesville: University Press of Florida, 2013, ISBN 978-0813049229. Originally published by Purdue University Press, 1995.
- Mayers, Adam. Dixie and the Dominion: Canada, the Confederacy, and the War for the Union. Dundurn Press, 2004. ISBN 155002468X.
- Merli, Frank J. The Alabama, British Neutrality, and the American Civil War. Indiana University Press, 2004.
- Myers, Phillip E. Caution and Cooperation: The American Civil War in British–American Relations. Kent, Ohio: Kent State University Press, 2008.
- Owsley, Frank Lawrence. King Cotton Diplomacy: Foreign Relations of the Confederate States of America, 2nd ed. Chicago: University of Chicago Press, 1959.
- Peraino, Kevin. Lincoln in the World: The Making of a Statesman and the Dawn of American Power. New York: Crown Publishers, 2013. Review by Don H. Doyle
- Sainlaude, Stève. The Imperial Government and the American Civil War: The Diplomatic Action. Paris: L'Harmattan, 2011.
- Sainlaude, Stève. France and the Confederacy (1861–1865). Paris: L'Harmattan, 2011.
- Sainlaude, Stève. France and the American Civil War: A Diplomatic History. Chapel Hill, NC: University of North Carolina Press, 2019.
- Sebrell II, Thomas E. Persuading John Bull: Union and Confederate Propaganda in Britain, 1860–1865. Lexington Books, 2014.
- Woldman, Albert A. Lincoln and the Russians. Cleveland and New York: The World Publishing Company, 1952.

== Collected biographies ==
- Bowman, John S. Who Was Who in the Civil War. (Random House, 1994).
- Hubbell, John T. Biographical Dictionary of the Union: Northern Leaders of the Civil War. (Greenwood, 1995).
- McNeese, Tim. Civil War Leaders (Infobase Publishing, 2009) Popular history.
- Ritter, Charles F., and Jon L. Wakelyn, eds., Leaders of the American Civil War: A Biographical and Historiographical Dictionary (1998) short biographies and valuable historiographical summaries.
- Sifakis, Stewart. Who was Who in the Union: A Comprehensive, Illustrated Biographical Reference to More Than 1,500 of the Principal Union Participants in the Civil War (Facts on File, 1988).
- Sifakis, Stewart. Who Was Who in the Civil War: A comprehensive, illustrated biographical reference to more than 2,500 of the principal Union and Confederate participants in the War Between the States (2014), 780 pp
- Sifakis, Stewart. Who was Who in the Confederacy: A Comprehensive, Illustrated Biographical Reference to More Than 1,000 of the Principal Confederacy Participants in the Civil War (Facts on File, 1988).
- Spencer, James. Civil War Generals: Categorical Listings and a Biographical Directory (Greenwood, 1986).

== Soldiers and sailors ==
- (no author listed) Official Roster of the Soldiers of the State of Ohio in the War of the Rebellion, 1861–1866, eight volumes. Cincinnati: The Ohio Valley Press, 1888.
- (no author listed) The Soldier of Indiana in the War for the Union. Indianapolis, Indiana: Merrill, 1869.
- Bennett, Michael J. Union Jacks: Yankee Sailors in the Civil War. Chapel Hill: University of North Carolina Press, 2004.
- Booth, Andrew. Records of Louisiana Confederate Soldiers and Louisiana Confederate Commands, three volumes. New Orleans: no publisher listed, 1920.
- Broadfoot Publishing Company. The Roster of Confederate Soldiers 1861–1865, sixteen volumes. Wilmington, North Carolina: Broadfoot Publishing Company, 1995–1996.
- Broadfoot Publishing Company. The Roster of Union Soldiers 1861–1865, thirty–three volumes. Wilmington, North Carolina: Broadfoot Publishing Company, 1996 to date.
- Frank, Joseph Allan and George A. Reaves. Seeing the Elephant: Raw Recruits at the Battle of Shiloh (1989)
- Giesberg, Judith Ann. Sex and the Civil War: Soldiers, Pornography, and the Making of American Morality (U of North Carolina Press, 2017).
- Glatthaar, Joseph T. The March to the Sea and Beyond: Sherman's Troops in the Savannah and Carolinas Campaigns. New York: New York University Press, 1985. ISBN 0814730019.
- Glatthaar, Joseph T. and Aaron Charles Sheehan. The View from the Ground: Experiences of Civil War Soldiers (2006)
- Glatthaar, Joseph T. General Lee's Army: From Victory to Collapse. New York: Free Press, 2008. ISBN 978-0684827872.
- Hartman, David W. and David J. Coles, comps. Biographical Rosters of Florida's Confederate and Union Soldiers, 1861–1865, five volumes. Wilmington, North Carolina: Broadfoot Publishing, 1995.
- Hess, Earl J. The Union Soldier in Battle: Enduring the Ordeal of Combat. Lawrence: University of Kansas Press, 1997. ISBN 978-0700608379.
- Hilderman, Walter C., III. They Went into the Fight Cheering! Confederate Conscription in North Carolina. Boone: Parkway, 2005.
- Johnson, Edward C., Gail R. Johnson, and Melissa Johnson William. All Were Not Heroes: A Study of "the List of U.S. Soldiers Executed by U.S. Military Authorities During the Late War". Chicago: privately published, 1997.
- Loon, Ella. Desertion During the Civil War. Boston: Century Company, 1928.
- Loury, Thomas P. Don't Shoot That Boy!: Abraham Lincoln and Military Justice. Mason City, Iowa: Savas Publishing, 199.
- Loury, Thomas P. and Lewis Laska. Confederate Death Sentences: A Reference Guide. Charleston, South Carolilna: Booksarge, 2008.
- McPherson, James M. For Cause and Country: Why Men Fought in the Civil War. Oxford and New York, Oxford University Press, 1997. ISBN 978-0195124996. (pbk.)
- Mitchell, Reid. Civil War Soldiers: Their Expectations and Their Experiences. New York: Viking, 1988.
- Mitchell, Reid. The Vacant Chair: The Northern Soldier Leaves Home. New York: Oxford University Press, 1993.
- Noe, Kenneth W. Reluctant Rebels: The Confederates Who Joined the Army After 1861. Chapel Hill: University of North Carolina Press, 2010. ISBN 978-0807833773.
- Nosworthy, Brent. The Bloody Crucible of Courage: Fighting Methods and Combat Experience of the Civil War. Carroll & Graf, 2003.
- Reid, Richard M. Freedom for Themselves: North Carolina's Black Soldiers in the Civil War Era. Chapel Hill: University of North Carolina Press, 2008.
- Still Jr. William N. The Common Sailor: The Civil War's Uncommon Man – Yankee Blue Jackets and Confederate Tars. (1985)
- Sutherland, Jonathan. Confederate Troops of the American Civil War. Wiltshire, UK: The Crowood Press, 2005. ISBN 1 86126 768 1.
- Thompson, Jerry Don. Mexican–Texans in the Union Army. El Paso, Texas: Western Press, 1986.
- Weitz, Mark A. More Damning than Slaughter: Desertion in the Confederate Army. University of Nebraska Press, 2005.
- Wiley, Bell Irvin. The Life of Billy Yank: The Common Soldier of the Union. Baton Rouge: Louisiana State University Press, 1978. ISBN 0807104760 (paper). First published Indianapolis: Bobbs-Merrill, 1952.
- Wiley, Bell Irvin. The Life of Johnny Reb: The Common Soldier of the Confederacy. Baton Rouge: Louisiana State University Press, 1978. ISBN 0807104752 (paper). First published Indianapolis, Bobbs-Merrill, 1943.

== Prisoners ==
- Arnold–Scriber, Theresa and Terry G. Scriber. Ship Island, Mississippi: Rosters and History of the Civil War Prison Jefferson, North Carolina: 2012. ISBN 978-0786468997.
- Beitzell, Edwin W. Point Lookout Prison Camp for Confederates. Abell, Maryland: published by author, 1972.
- Burnham, Philip. So Far from Dixie: Confederates in Yankee Prisons. New York: Taylor Trade Publishing, 2003.
- Butts, Michele Tucker. Galvanized Yankees on the Upper Missouri: The Face of Loyalty (2003).
- Casstevens, Frances. George W. Alexander and Castle Thunder: A Confederate Prison and Its Commandant. Jefferson, North Carolina: McFarland & Company, Inc., 2004.
- Cloyd, Benjamin G. Haunted by Atrocity: Civil War Prisons in American Memory. Baton Rouge: Louisiana State University Press, 2010.
- Denney, Robert E. Civil War Prisons & Escapes: A Day–by–Day Chronicle. New York: Sterling Publishing Co., 1993.
- Fetzer, Jr., Dale and Bruce E. Mowdey. Unlikely Allies: Fort Delaware's Prison Community in the Civil War. Harrisburg, Pennsylvania: Stackpole Books, 2002. ISBN 0811718239.
- Gray, Michael P. The Business of Captivity in the Chemung Valley: Elmira and Its Civil War Prison (2001)
- Hesseltine, William B. Civil War Prisons: A Study in War Psychology. Columbus: Ohio State University Press, 1930. ISBN 0814207685.
- Horigan, Michael. Elmira: Death Camp of the North. Mechanicsburg, Pennsylvania: Stackpole Books, 2002. ISBN 978-0811732765.
- Kelley, Daniel G. What I Saw and Suffered in Rebel Prisons. Buffalo, New York: Thomas, Howard and Johnson, 1868.
- Lawrence, F. Lee and Robert Glover. Camp Ford, C.S.A.: The Story of Union Prisoners in Texas. Austin: Texas Civil War Centennial Advisory Committee, 1964.
- Levy, George, To Die in Chicago: Confederate Prisoners at Camp Douglas 1862–1865. Gretna, Louisiana: Pelican Publishing Company, revised edition 1999. ISBN 978-1565543317. First published 1994.
- Lisarelli, Daniel Francis. The Last Prison: The Untold Story of Camp Groce CSA. Unpublish.com/books/lisarelli.htm, 1999.
- Marvel, William. Andersonville: The Last Depot. University of North Carolina Press, 1994.
- McAdams, Benton. Rebels at Rock Island: The Story of a Civil War Prison. De Kalbe: Northern Illinois University Press, 2005.
- Parker, Sandra V. Richmond's Civil War Prisons. Lynchburg, Virginia: H.E. Howard, 1990.
- Sanders, Charles W., Jr. While in the Hands of the Enemy: Military Prisons of the Civil War. Louisiana State University Press, 2005.
- Scharf, Jack E. Lee's Bold Plan for Point Lookout: The Rescue of Confederate Prisoners That Never Happened. Jefferson, North Carolina: McFarland, 2008.
- Speer, Lonnie R. Portals to Hell: Military Prisons of the Civil War. 1997.
- Speer, Lonnie. War of Vengeance: Acts of Retaliation Against Civil War POWs. Mechanicsburg, Pennsylvania: Stackpole Books, 2002.
- Triebe, Richard H. Fort Fisher to Elmira: The Fateful Journey of 518 Confederate Soldiers. CreateSpace, 2011.
- Watson, Ronald G., editor. "Death Does Seem to Have All He Can Attend to": The Civil War Diary of an Anderson Survivor. Jefferson, North Carolina: McFarland Publishing, 2014. ISBN 978-0786478903.
- Wheelan, Joseph. Libby Prison Breakout: The Daring Escape from the Notorious Civil War Prison. New York: Public Affairs, 2010. ISBN 978-1586487164.

== Violence and death ==
- Carmichael, Peter S. The War for the Common Soldier: How Men Thought, Fought, and Survived in Civil War Armies (2018) excerpt
- Faust, Drew Gilpin. This Republic of Suffering: Death and the American Civil War (2008) excerpt
- Hacker, J. David. "A Census-Based Count of the Civil War Dead" Civil War History 57.4 (2011): 307–348.
- Hacker, J. David. "Has the Demographic Impact of Civil War Deaths Been Exaggerated?." Civil War History 60.4 (2014): 453–458 excerpt
- Marshall, Nicholas. "The Great Exaggeration: Death and the Civil War" Journal of the Civil War Era 4#1 (2014) pp. 3–27 online
- Neff, John R. Honoring the Civil War Dead: Commemoration and the Problem of Reconciliation (UP of Kansas, 2016) online.
- Schantz, Mark S. Awaiting the Heavenly Country: The Civil War and America's Culture of Death (Cornell UP, 2008).
- Scott, Sean A. "'Earth Has No Sorrow That Heaven Cannot Cure': Northern Civilian Perspectives on Death and Eternity during the Civil War," Journal of Social History (2008). 41#4:843–866 online
- Sheehan-Dean, Aaron. The Calculus of Violence: How Americans Fought the Civil War (Harvard UP, 2018). pp. 465. excerpt also online review
- Steplyk, Jonathan M. Fighting Means Killing: Civil War Soldiers and the Nature of Combat (UP of Kansas, 2018) online
- Sutherland, Daniel E. Guerrillas, Unionists, and Violence on the Confederate Home Front (U of Arkansas Press, 2009).
- Swanson, David A., and Richard Verdugo. "The Civil War’s Demographic Impact on White Males in Mississippi." Journal of the Mississippi Academy of Sciences 62#3 (2017): 309+ oneline.

== Guerillas ==
- Barton, O.S. Three Years with Quantrill: A True Story by His Scout John McCorkle. Norman: University of Oklahoma Press, 1992.
- Beilein, Joseph M. and Matthew Christopher Hulbert, eds. The Civil War Guerrilla: Unfolding the Black Flag in History, Memory, and Myth. Lexington: University Press of Kentucky, 2015. ISBN 978-0813165325.
- Black, Col. Robert W. Yank and Rebel Rangers: Special Operations in the American Civil War. Yorkshire; Philadelphia: Pen and Sword Military, 2019. ISBN 978-1-52674-444-9.
- Brant, Marley. The Outlaw Youngers: A Confederate Brotherhood. New York: Madison Books, 1992. ISBN 0819186279.
- Breihan, Carl W. Quantrill and his Civil War Guerillas. Denver, Colorado: Sage Books, 1959.
- Brownlee, Richard S. Gray Ghosts of the Confederacy: Guerilla Warfare in the West, 1861–1865. Baton Rouge: Louisiana State University Press, 1958.
- Castel, Albert. William Clark Quantrill: His Life and Times. New York: Frederick Fell, Inc., Publishers, 1962.
- Castel, Albert and Thomas Goodrich. Bloody Bill Anderson: The Short Savage Life of a Civil War Guerilla. Harrisburg, Pennsylvania: Stackpole Books, 1998. ISBN 081171506X.
- Connelley, William Elsey. Quantrill and the Border Wars. New York: Pageant Book Company, 1956.
- Crouch, Richard E. Rough–Riding Scout: The Story of John W. Mobberley, Loudoun's Own Civil War Guerilla Hero. Arlington, Virginia: Edden Editions.
- Dyer, Robert L. Jesse James and the Civil War in Missouri. Columbia: University of Missouri Press, 1994.
- Edwards, John N. Noted Guerillas, or the Warfare of the Border. Being a History of the Lives and Adventures of Quantell, Bill Anderson, George Todd, Dave Poole, Fletcher Taylor, Peyton Long, Oll Shepherd, Arch Clements, John Maupin, Tuck and Woot Hill, Wm. Gregg, Thomas Maupin, the James Brothers, the Younger Brothers, Arthur McCoy, and Numerous Other Well Known Guerillas of the West. St. Louis: Bryan, Brand & Company, 1877.
- Erwin, James W. Guerilla Hunters in Civil War Missouri. Charleston, South Carolina: The History Press, 2012. ISBN 978-1609497453.
- Fellman, Michael. Inside War: The Guerilla Conflict in Missouri During the American Civil War. New York: Oxford University Press, 1989. ISBN 019505198X.
- Goodrich, Thomas. Black Flag: Guerilla Warfare on the Western Border, 1861–1865. Indianapolis: Indiana University Press, 1995. ISBN 0253325994.
- Fisher, Noel C. War at Every Door: Partisan Politics & Guerrilla Violence in East Tennessee, 1860-1869. Chapel Hill: University of North Carolina Press, 1997. ISBN 978-0-8078-2367-5.
- Hulbert, Matthew Christopher. The Ghosts of Guerrilla Memory: How Civil War Bushwhackers Became Gunslingers in the American West. Athens: University of Georgia Press, 2016. ISBN 978-0820350028.
- Jones, Virgil Carrington. Gray Ghosts and Rebel Raiders. Atlanta: Mockingbird Books, 1973. ISBN 0891760164. First published New York: Holt, Rinehart and Winston, 1956.
- Leslie, Edward E. The Devil Knows How to Ride: The True Story of William Clarke Quantrill and His Confederate Raiders. New York: Random House, 1996. ISBN 0679424555.
- Mackey, Robert R. The Uncivil War: Irregular Warfare in the Upper South, 1861–1865. Norman: University of Oklahoma Press, 2004.
- Mays, Thomas D. Cumberland Blood: Champ Ferguson's Civil War. Carbondale, Southern Illinois University Press, 2008. ISBN 0809328607.
- McKnight, Brian D. Confederate Outlaw: Champ Ferguson and the Civil War in Appalachia. Baton Rouge: Louisiana State University Press, 2011. ISBN 978-0807137697.
- McLachlan, Sean. American Civil War Guerilla Tactics. UK: Osprey Publishing, 2009. ISBN 1846034949.
- Mountcastle, Clay. Punitive War: Confederate Guerillas and Union Reprisals. Lawrence: University Press of Kansas, 2009.
- Nichols, Bruce. Guerilla Warfare in Civil War Missouri, 1862. Jefferson, North Carolina: McFarland & Company, 2004.
- O'Brien, Sean Michael. Mountain Partisans: Guerrilla Warfare in the Southern Appalachians, 1861–1865. Praeger, 1999.
- Olson, Gordon L. The Notorious Isaac Earl and His Scouts: Union Soldiers, Prisoners, Spies. Grand Rapids, MI: William B. Eerdmans Publishing Co., 2014. ISBN 978-0-8028-6801-5.
- Peterson, Paul R. Quantrill of Missouri: The Making of a Guerilla Warrior. Nashville, Tennessee: Cumberland House, 2003.
- Sensing, Thurman. Champ Ferguson: Confederate Guerilla. Vanderbilt University Press, 1942. ISBN 0826512534.
- Settle, William A. Jesse James Was His Name; or, Fact and Fiction Concerning the Careers of the Notorious James Brothers of Missouri. Columbia: University of Missouri Press, 1966.
- Schultz, Duane. Quantrill's War: The Life and Times of William Clarke Quantrill 1837–1865. New York: St. Martin's Press, 1996. ISBN 0312147104.
- Sheridan, Richard B., ed. Quantrill and the Lawrence Massacre – a Reader. Lawrence, Kansas: no publisher listed, 1997.
- Stiles, T.J. Jesse James: Last Rebel of the Civil War. New York: Alfred A. Knopf, 2002.
- Sutherland, Daniel E. "Sideshow No Longer: A Historiographical Review of the Guerrilla War." Civil War History 46.1 (2000): 5–23; American Civil War, 1861–65
- Sutherland, Daniel E. Guerrillas, Unionists, and Violence on the Confederate Home Front. Fayetteville: University of Arkansas Press, 2009.
- Sutherland, Daniel E. A Savage Conflict: The Decisive Role of Guerillas in the American Civil War. Chapel Hill: University of North Carolina Press, 2009.
- Thomas, Paul A.; Matthews, Matt M. (2025). Union Guerrillas of Civil War Kansas: Jayhawkers and Red Legs. Charleston, SC: The History Press. ISBN 9781467158084.
- Wert, Jeffry D. Mosby's Rangers: From the High Tide of the Confederacy to the Last Days at Appomattox – The Story of the Most Famous Command of the Civil War and Its Legendary Leader, John S. Mosby. New York: Simon & Schuster, 1990. ISBN 978-0-671-67360-4.
- Williamson, James J. Mosby's Rangers. New York: Ralph B. Kenyon, 1896. Reprint by Time-Life Books, 1982. ISBN 978-0-8094-4227-0.

== Ethnic groups ==
- Bailey, Anne J. Invisible Southerners: Ethnicity in the Civil War. Athens: University of Georgia Press, 2006.
- Kamphoefner, Walter D. et al. eds. Germans in the Civil War: The Letters They Wrote Home. 2006.
- Kaufmann, Wilhelm. The Germans in the American Civil War, With a Biographical Directory. Carlisle, Pa.: John Kallmann Publishers, 1999.
- Keller, Christian B. Chancellorsville and the German: Nativism, Ethnicity, and Civil War Memory. New York: Fordham University Press, 2007.
- Kohl, Lawrence. The Irish Brigade and Its Campaigns. 1994.
- Lause, Mark A. Race and Radicalism in the Union Army. Urbana: University of Illinois Press, 2009.
- Lonn, Ella, Foreigners in the Confederacy. 1940.
- McCarthy, Cal. Green, Blue & Grey: The Irish in the American Civil War. 2010.
- Mahin, Dean B. The Blessed Place of Freedom: Europeans in Civil War America. Dulles, Virginia: Brassey's Inc., 2002.
- Samito, Christian G. Becoming American Under Fire: Irish Americans, African Americans, and the Politics of Citizenship During the Civil War Era. Ithaca, New York: Cornell University Press, 2009.
- Sarna, Jonathan D. and Adam Mendelshon, eds. Jews and the Civil War: A Reader. New York University Press, 2010.
- Thompson, Jerry D. Mexican Texans in the Union Army. El Paso, Texas: Texas Western Press, 1986.
- Tucker, Phillip Thomas. Irish Confederates: The Civil War's Forgotten Soldiers. 2007.
- Ural, Susannah J., ed. Civil War Citizens: Race, Ethnicity, and Identity in America's Bloodiest Conflict. New York: New York University Press, 2010. ISBN 978-0814785706.
- Vida, Istvan Kornel. Hungarian Émigrés in the American Civil War: A History and Biographical Dictionary. Jefferson, North Carolina: McFarland, 2011. ISBN 978-0786465620.

=== African Americans ===
- Barrow, Charles Kelly, J.H. Segars, and R.B. Rosenburg, editors. Forgotten Confederates: An Anthology about Black Southerners. Murfreesboro, Tennessee: Southern Heritage Press, 1995.
- Bergeron, Arthur W. and Richard M. Rollins. Black Southerners in Gray: Essays on Afro-Americans in Confederate Armies. Rank and File Publications, 1994.
- Berlin, Ira, Joseph P. Reidy, and Leslie S. Rowland, eds. Freedom's Soldiers: The Black Military Experience in the Civil War. Cambridge, UK: Cambridge University Press, 1998.
- Blatt, Martin H., Thomas J. Brown, and Donald Yacovone, editors. Hope and Glory: Essays on the Legacy of the 54th Massachusetts Regiment. Amherst: University of Massachusetts Press, 2001.
- Brown, William Wlls. The Negro in the American Rebellion: His Heroism and His Fidelity, edited by John D. Smith. Athen: Ohio University Press, 2003.
- Burchard, Peter. One Gallant Rush: Robert Gould Shaw and His Brave Black Regiment. New York: St. Martin's, 1965.
- Cimprich, John. Fort Pillow, a Civil War Massacre, and Public Memory. Baton Rouge: Louisiana State University Press, 2005.
- Cornish, Dudley Taylor. The Sable Arm: Black Troops in the Union Army, 1861–1865. Lawrence: University Press of Kansas, 1987.
- Downs, Jim. Sick from Freedom: African-American Illness and Suffering during the Civil War and Reconstruction. New York: Oxford University Press, 2012.
- Durden, Robert Franklin. The Gray and the Black: The Confederate Debate on Emancipation. Baton Rouge: Louisiana State University Press, 2000.
- Gannon, Barbarra A. The Won Cause: Black and White Comradeship in the Grand Army of the Republic. Chapel Hill,

University of North Carolina Press, 2011. ISBN 978-0807834527.

- Gladstone, William A. United States Colored Troops, 1863–1867. Gettysburg, Pennsylvania: Thomas Publications, 1990.
- Glatthaar, Joseph T. Forged in Battle: The Civil War Alliance of Black Soldiers and White Officers. Baton Rouge: Louisiana State University Press, 1990. ISBN 0807125601.
- Glatthaar, Joseph T. The Civil War's Black Soldiers. Eastern National Park and Monument Association, 1996.
- Hollandsworth, Jr., James G. The Louisiana Native Guards: The Black Military Experience During the Civil War. Baton Rouge: Louisiana State University Press, 1995.
- Humphreys, Margaret. Intensely Human: The Health of the Black Soldier in the American Civil War. Baltimore, Maryland: Johns Hopkins University Press, 2008.
- Levine, Bruce. Confederate Emancipation: Southern Plans to Free and Arm Slaves during the Civil War. New York: Oxford University Press, 2005. ISBN 978-0195147629.
- Longacre, Edward G. A Regiment of Slaves: The 4th United States Colored Infantry, 1863–1866. Mechanicsburg, Pennsylvania: Stackpole Books, 2003.
- Magness, Philip W. and Sebastion N. Page. Colonization After Emancipation: Lincoln and the Movement for Black Resettlement. Columbia: University of Missouri Press, 2011.
- McPherson, James. The Negro's Civil War: How American Blacks Felt and Acted During the War for the Union. 1965. New York: Ballantine Books, 1991.
- Quarles, Benjamin. The Negro in the Civil War. Boston: Little, Brown, 1953.
- Reed, Richard M. Freedom for themselves: North Carolina's Black Soldiers in the Civil War Era. Chapel Hill: University of North Carolina Press, 2008.
- Robinson, Armstead L. Bitter Fruits of Bondage: The Demise of Slavery and the Collapse of the Confederacy, 1861–1865. Charlottesville: University Press of Virginia, 2005.
- Rollins, Richard, editor. Black Southerners in Gray: Essays on Afro-Americans in Confederate Armies. Murfreesboro, Tennessee: Southern Heritage Press, 1994.
- Segars, J.H. and Charles Kelly Barrow, compilers. Black Southerners in Confederate Armies: A Collection of Historical Accounts. Atlanta: Southern Lion Books, 2001.
- Trudeau, Noah Andre. Like Men of War: Black Troops in the Civil War 1862–1865. Edison, NJ: Castle Books, 2002. ISBN 978-0785814764. Originally published: New York: Little, Brown and Company, 1998.
- Ward, Andrew. River Run Red: The Fort Pillow Massacre in the American Civil War. New York: Viking, 2005.
- Williams, George Washington. A History of the Negro Troops in the War of the Rebellion, 1861–1865. New York: 1888.
- Wilson, Keith, editor. Honor in Command: Lt. Freeman S. Bowley's Civil War Service in the 30th United States Colored Infantry. Gainesville: University Press of Florida, 2006.

==== Primary sources ====
- Adair, Lyle, and Glenn Robins. They Have Left Us Here to Die: The Civil War Prison Diary of Sgt. Lyle Adair, 111th U.S. Colored Infantry. Kent, Ohio: Kent State University Press, 2011.

=== American Indians ===
- Abel, Annie Heloise. The American Indian as a Participant in the Civil War. Cleveland, Ohio: Arthur Clarke, 1919.
- Abel, Annie Heloise. The American Indian as Slaveholder and Secessionist: An Omitted Chapter of the Southern Confederacy. Cleveland, Ohio: A. H. Clark Company, 1919.
- Berg, Scott W. 38 Nooses: Lincoln, Little Crow, and the Beginning of the Frontier's End. New York: Pantheon, 2012.
- Confer, Clarissa W. The Cherokee Nation in the Civil War. Norman: University of Oklahoma Press, 2007.
- Crow, Vernon H. Storm in the Mountains: Thomas' Confederate Indians and Mountaineers. Cherokee, North Carolina: Museum of the Cherokee Indians, 1982.
- Crowe, Clint. Caught in the Maelstrom: The Indian Nations in the Civil War, 1861–1865. Savas Beatie, 2019. ISBN 978-1611213362.
- Cunningham, Frank. General Stand Watie's: Confederate Indians. Norman: University of Oklahoma Press, 1959.
- Danziger, Jr., Edmund J. Indians and Bureaucrats: Administrating the Reservation Policy During the Civil War. Urbana: University of Illinois Press, 1974.
- Franks, Kenny A. Stand Watie and the Agony of the Cherokee Nation. Memphis, Tennessee: Memphis State University Press, 1979.
- Hauptman, Laurence M. Between Two Fires: American Indians in the Civil War. New York: The Free Press, 1995. ISBN 002914180X.
- Hauptman, Lawrence M. The Iroquois in the Civil War: From Battlefield to Reservation. Syracuse, New York: Syracuse University Press, 1993.
- Kelman, Ari. A Misplaced Massacre: Struggling over the memory of Sand Creek. Cambridge, Massachusetts: Harvard University Press, 2013.
- Madsen, Brigham D. The Shoshoni Frontier and the Bear River Massacre. Provo: University of Utah Press, 1985.
- McBride, Lela Jean. Opothleyaholo and the Loyal Muskogee: Their Flight to Kansas in the Civil War. Jefferson, North Carolina: McFarland & Company, Inc., 2000. ISBN 0786406380.
- Minges, Patrick. Slavery in the Cherokee Nation: The Keetowah Society and the Defining of a People, 1855–1867. Routledge, 2003.
- Nichols, David A. Lincoln and the Indians: Civil War Policy and Politics. Columbia: University of Missouri Press, 1978.
- Oehler, C.M. The Great Sioux Uprising. New York: Oxford University Press, 1959.

==== Primary sources ====
- Baird, W. David, editor. A Creek Warrior for the Confederacy: The Autobiography of Chief G.W. Greyson. Norman: University of Oklahoma Press, 1998.
- Edwards, Whit. "The Prairie Was on Fire": Eyewitness Accounts of the Civil War in the Indian Territory. Oklahoma Historical Society, 2001.
- Hauptman, Laurence M., ed. A Seneca Indian in the Union Army: The Letters of Sergeant Isaac Newton Parker. Columbia, Maryland: White Mane Publishing Co., 1995.
- Moulton, Gary E., ed. The Papers of John Ross, two volumes. Norman: University of Oklahoma Press, 1985.

== Women ==
=== National ===
- Berkin, Carol. Civil War Wives: The Lives and Times of Angelina Grimke Weld, Varina Howell Davis and Julia Dent Grant. New York: Alfred A. Knopf, 2009. ISBN 978-1400044665.
- Clinton, Catherine and Silber, Nina, eds. Battle Scars: Gender and Sexuality in the American Civil War. New York: Oxford University Press, 2006.
- Frank, Lisa Tendric, ed. Women in the American Civil War. ABC-CLIO, 2008.
- Giesberg, Judith, and Randall M. Miller, eds. Women and the American Civil War: North-South Counterpoints (2018) online review
- Harper, Judith E. Women during the Civil War: An Encyclopedia. Routledge, 2004.
- Holstein, Anna Morris. Three Years In Field Hospitals Of The Army Of The Potomac, J. B. Lippincott & Company, 1867
- McDevitt, Theresa. Women and the American Civil War: An Annotated Bibliography. Praeger, 2003.
- Massey, Mary Elizabeth. Bonnet Brigades: American Women and the Civil War. 1966.
- Mitchell, Reid. The Vacant Chair: The Northern Soldier Leaves Home. New York: Oxford University Press, 1995.
- Murphy, Kim. I Had Rather Die: Rape in the Civil War. Virginia: Coachlight Press, LLC, 2014.
- Schultz, Jane E. Women at the Front: Hospital Workers in Civil War America. Chapel Hill: University of North Carolina Press, 2004.
- Young, Elizabeth. Disarming the Nation: Women's Writing and the American Civil War. Chicago: University of Chicago Press, 1999.

=== North ===
- Anderson, J. L. "The Vacant Chair on the Farm: Soldier Husbands, Farm Wives, and the Iowa Home Front, 1861–1865," Annals of Iowa (2007) 66: 241–265
- Attie, Jeanie. "Patriotic Toil: Northern Women and the American Civil War." Ithaca: Cornell University Press, 1998.
- Bahde, Thomas. "'I never wood git tired of wrighting to you.'" Journal of Illinois History, 2009. 12:129–155
- Fleischner, Jennifer. Mrs. Lincoln and Mrs. Keckly: The Remarkable Story of the Friendship Between a First Lady and a Former Slave. New York: Broadway Books, 2003.
- Gallman, Matthew J. Mastering Wartime: A Social History of Philadelphia During the Civil War. New York: Cambridge University Press, 1990.
- Gallman, Matthew J, America's Joan of Arc: The Life of Anna Elizabeth Dickinson. Oxford University Press, 2006.
- Giesberg, Judith. Army at Home: Women and the Civil War on the Northern Home Front. Chapel Hill, North Carolina: University of North Carolina Press, 2009.
- Hall, Richard. Patriots in Disguise. New York: Paragon House, 1993.
- Marten, James. Children for the Union: The War Spirit on the Northern Home Front. Ivan R. Dee, 2004.
- Scott, Sean A. "'Earth Has No Sorrow That Heaven Cannot Cure': Northern Civilian Perspectives on Death and Eternity during the Civil War," Journal of Social History, 2008. 41:843–866
- Silber, Nina. Daughters of the Union: Northern Women Fight the Civil War. Harvard University Press, 2005.
- Smith, Michael T. "The Beast Unleashed: Benjamin F. Butler and Conceptions of Masculinity in the Civil War North." New England Quarterly 2006 79(2): 248–276. ISSN 0028-4866
- Venet, Wendy Hamand. A Strong-Minded Woman: The Life of Mary Livermore. University of Massachusetts Press, 2005.

=== Black South ===
- Frankel, Noralee. Freedom's Women: Black Women and Families in Civil War Era Mississippi. 1999.
- Schwalm, Leslie A. (1997). "'Sweet Dreams of Freedom': Freedwomen's Reconstruction of Life and Labor in Lowcountry South Carolina," Journal of Women's History 9: 9–38
- Wiley, Bell I. Confederate Women. Westport, Connecticut: Greenwood, 1975.

=== White South ===
- no author listed. Confederate Women of Arkansas in the Civil War, 1861–'65: Memorial Reminiscences. Little Rock, Arkansas: The United Confederate Veterans of Arkansas. State Committee on Memorial to Women of the Confederacy, November 1907.
- Anderson, Lucy London. North Carolina Women of the Confederacy. Fayettesville, North Carolina: published by author, 1926.
- Andrews, Eliza Frances. The War-Time Journal of a Georgia Girl: 1864–1865. New York: Appleton, 1908.
- Andrews, Matthew Page, compiler. Women of the Southern War Times. Baltimore, Maryland: Norman Remington, 1927.
- Berry II, Stephen W. All that Makes a Man: Love and Ambition in the Civil War South. Oxford University Press, 2003.
- Brock, Darla. "'Our Hands Are At Your Service': The Story of Confederate Women in Memphis." West Tennessee Historical Society Papers (1991) 45: 19–34
- Drago, Edmund L. Confederate Phoenix: Rebel Children and Their Families in South Carolina. Fordham University Press, 2008. ISBN 978-0823229376.
- Faust, Drew. Mothers of Invention: Women of the Slaveholding South in the American Civil War. Chapel Hill: University of North Carolina Press, 1996.
- Frank, Lisa T. The Civilian War: Confederate Women and Union Soldiers During Sherman's March. Baton Rouge: Louisiana State University Press, 2015. ISBN 978-0807159965.
- Gardner, Sarah E. Blood and Irony: Southern White Women's Narratives of the Civil War, 1861–1937. Chapel Hill: University of North Carolina Press, 2004.
- Genovese, Eugene D. A Consuming Fire: The Fall of the Confederacy in the Mind of the White Christian South Athens: University of Georgia Press, 2009.
- Hilde, Libra R. Worth a Dozen Men: Women and Nursing in the Civil War South. Charlottesville: University of Virginia Press, 2012. ISBN 978-0813932125.
- Jabour, Anya. Scarlett's Sisters: Young Women in the Old South. Chapel Hill: University of North Carolina Press, 2009.
- Ott, Victoria E. Confederate Daughters: Coming of Age during the Civil War. Carbondale: Southern Illinois University Press, 2008. ISBN 978-0809328284.
- Rable. George. Civil Wars: Women and the Crisis of Southern Nationalism. Urbana: University of Illinois Press, 1989.
- Revels, Tracy J. Grander in Her Daughters: Florida's Women during the Civil War. University of South Carolina Press, 2004.
- Roberts, Giselle. The Confederate Belle. University of Missouri Press, 2003.
- Strasser, William A. (1999). "'A Terrible Calamity Has Befallen Us': Unionist Women in Civil War East Tennessee". Journal of East Tennessee History. 71: 66–88
- Whites, LeeAnn. The Civil War as a Crisis in Gender: Augusta, Georgia, 1860–1890 Athens: University of Georgia Press, 1995.
- Whites, LeeAnn and Alecia P. Long, editors. Occupied Women: Gender, Military Occupation, and the American Civil War. Baton Rouge: Louisiana State University Press, 2010. ISBN 978-0807134405.
- Wiley, Bell Irvin. Confederate Women, Westport, Connecticut: Greenwood Press, 1975.

=== Primary sources ===
- Ashton, Dianne, ed. The Civil War Diary of Emma Mordecai. New York University Press, 2024
- Baird, Nancy Disher, ed. Josie Underwood's Civil War Diary. University Press of Kentucky, 2009.
- Berlin, Jean V., ed. A Confederate Nurse: The Diary of Ada W. Bacot, 1860–1863. Columbia: University of South Carolina Press, 1994.
- Dawson, Sarah Morgan. A Confederate Girl's Diary. Bloomington: Indiana University Press, 1960.
- Fain, John N. Sanctified Trial: The Diary of Eliza Rhea Anderson Fain, a Confederate Woman in East Tennessee. Knoxville: University of Tennessee Press, 2002.
- Heller III, J. Roderick, and Carolynn Ayres Heller, eds. The Confederacy in on Her Way up the Spout: Letters to South Carolina, 1861–1864. Athens: University of Georgia Press, 1992.
- McGuire, Judith Breckinbrough. Diary of a Southern Refugee During the War: Annotated Edition. Edited by James I. Robertson. Lexington: University Press of Kentucky, 2014. ISBN 978-0813144382.
- Robertson, Mary D., ed. Lucy Breckinridge of Grove Hall: The Journal of a Virginia Girl, 1862–1864. Columbia: University of South Carolina Press, 1994.
- Rohr, Nancy M., ed. Incidents of War: The Civil War Journal of Mary Jane Chadick. Boaz, Alabama: SilverThreads Publishing, 2005.
- Woodward, C. Vann, Ed., Mary Chesnut's Civil War, Yale University Press, 1981, ISBN 0300029799

== Ideology, rhetoric, religion ==
- (no author listed) Report of the Committee on the Destruction of Churches in the Diocese of South Carolina During the Late War: Presented to the Protestant Episcopal Convention, May 1868. Charleston, South Carolina: J. Walker, Printer, 1868.
- Bennett, William. A Narrative of the Great Revival which Prevailed in the Southern Armies. Philadelphia, Pennsylvania: Claxton, Remsen, and Haffelfinger, 1877.
- Brinsfield, John W.; Davis, William C.; Maryniak, Benedict; and Robertson, James I., eds. Faith in the Fight: Civil War Chaplains. Harrisburg, Pennsylvania: Stackpole Books, 2003.
- Dorn, T. Felder. Challenges on the Emmaus Road: Episcopal Bishops Confront Slavery, Civil War and Emancipation. Columbia: University of South Carolina Press, 2013. ISBN 978-1611211047.
- Durkin, Joseph T. Confederate Chaplin: A War Journal of Rev. James B. Sheeran, C.SS.R. Fourteenth Louisiana, CSA. Milwaukee, Wisconsin: Bruce Publishing Company, 1960.
- Faust, Drew Gilpin. The Creation of Confederate Nationalism: Ideology and Identity in the Civil War South. Baton Rouge: Louisiana State University Press, 1988.
- Foner, Eric. Free Soil, Free Labor, Free Men: The Ideology of the Republican Party before the Civil War. New York: Oxford University Press, 1970. ISBN 978-0195099812.
- Frederickson, George M. The Inner Civil War: Northern Intellectuals and the Crisis of the Union. New York: Harper & Row, 1965.
- Gallman, J. Matthew. Defining Duty in the Civil War. The University of North Carolina Press, 2015.
- Gourley, Bruce T. Diverging Loyalties: Baptists in Middle Georgia During the Civil War. Macon, Georgia: Mercer University Press, 2011.
- Guelzo, Allen C. Abraham Lincoln as a Man of Ideas. Carbondale: Southern Illinois University Press, 2009.
- Hutchison, Coleman. Apples and Ashes: Literature, Nationalism and the Confederate States of America Athens: University of Georgia Press, 2012.
- Korn, Bertram. American Jewry and the American Civil War. New York: Athenaeum, 1970.
- Lehman, James O. and Steven M. Nolt. Mennonites, Amish, and the American Civil War. Baltimore, Maryland: Johns Hopkins University, 2007.
- McPherson, James. What They Fought For, 1861–1865. Baton Rouge, Louisiana: Louisiana State University Press, 1994.
- Miller, Randall M., Harry S. Stout, and Charles Reagan Wilson, eds. Religion and the American Civil War. New York: Oxford University Press, 1998. ISBN 0195121287.
- Neff, John R. Honoring the Civil War Dead: Commemoration and the Problem of Reconciliation. Lawrence: University Press of Kansas, 2005.
- Nelson, Jacquelyn Sue. Indiana Quakers confront the Civil War. Indiana Historical Society, 1991.
- Noll, Mark A. The Civil War as a Theological Crisis. Chapel Hill: University of North Carolina Press, 2006.
- Rolfs, David. No Peace for the Wicked: Northern Protestant Soldiers in the American Civil War. Knoxville: University of Tennessee Press, 2009. ISBN 978-1572336629.
- Sarna, Jonathan D. When Grant Expelled the Jews. New York: Schocken Books, 2012.
- Scott, Sean A. A Visitation of God: Northern Civilians Interpret the Civil War. New York: Oxford University Press, 2011. ISBN 978-0195395990.
- Silver, James W. Confederate Morality and Church Propaganda. New York: W.W. Norton, 1967.
- Stout, Harry S. Upon the Altar of the Nation: A Moral History of the Civil War. 2006.
- Wells, Cheryl A. Civil War Time: Temporality and Identity in America, 1861–1865. University of Georgia Press, 2005.
- Wills, Garry. Lincoln at Gettysburg: The Words That Remade America. New York: Literary Research, Inc., 1992. ISBN 0671867423
- Wilson, Douglas L. Honor's Voice: The Transformation of Abraham Lincoln (1999).
- Wilson, Edmund. Patriotic Gore: Studies in the Literature of the American Civil War. New York: Oxford University Press 1962; reprinted: Boston: Northeastern University Press, 1984. ISBN 0930350618.

== Veterans ==
- (no author listed) Report of Seventh Annual Reunion of the 64th N.Y. Regimental Association at Salamanca, New York, August 21 and 22, 1895. New York: Randolph Publishing, 1894.
- (no author listed) Reunions of the Nineteenth Main Regiment Association. Augusta, Maine: Press of Sprague, Owen and Nash, 1878.
- Carroon, Robert G. and Dana B. Shoaf. Union Blue: The History of the Military Order of the Loyal Legion of the United States. Shippensburg, Pennsylvania: White Mane Books, 2001.
- Dearing, Mary R. Veterans in Politics: The Story of the G.A.R. Baton Rouge: Louisiana State University Press, 1952.
- Frazier, John W. Reunions of the Blue and Gray. Philadelphia Brigade and Pickett's Division, July 2, 3, 4, 1887 and Sept. 15, 16, 17, 1906. Philadelphia: Ware Brothers, 1906.
- Gannon, Barbara A. The Won Cause: Black and White Comradeship in the Grand Army of the Republic. Chapel Hill: University of North Carolina Press, 2011. ISBN 978-0807834527.
- Grzyb, Frank L. The Last Civil War Veterans: The Lives of the Final Survivors, State by State. Jefferson, NC: McFarland & Co., Inc., 2016. ISBN 978-1-4766-6522-1
- Heuvel, Sean M. Images of America: Remembering Virginia's Confederates. Arcadia Publishing, 2010. ISBN 978-0738566115.
- Hunt, Robert. The Good Men Who Won the War: Army of the Cumberland Veterans and Emancipation Memory. Tuscaloosa: University of Alabama Press, 2010.
- O'Mara, Daniel A. Proceedings of the Associated Survivors of the Fifty-Ninth Reg't, N.Y. Vet. Vols. First Annual Re-Union and Dedication of Monument at Gettysburg, Pa., July 3d, 1889. New York: Wm. Finley, Printer, 1889.
- Shaffer, Donald R. After the Glory: The Struggles of Black Civil War Veterans. Lawrence: University of Kansas Press, 2004.
- Work, J.B., ed. Re–Union of Col. Dan McCook's Third Brigade, Second Division, Fourteenth A.C., "Army of the Cumberland": Assault of Col. Dan McCook's Brigade on Kenesaw Mountain, Ga., June 27, 1864/August 27th and 29th, 1900. Chicago: Allied, 1901.

== Historiography ==
- Aaron, Daniel. The Unwritten War: American Writers and the Civil War. New York: Alfred A. Knopf, 1973.
- Aimone, Alan C. and Barbara A. A User's Guide to the Official Records of the American Civil War. Shippensburg, Pennsylvania: White Mane Publishing Company, Inc., 1993. ISBN 0942597389.
- Bailey, Anne J., and Daniel E. Sutherland. "The history and historians of Civil War Arkansas." Arkansas Historical Quarterly 58.3 (1999): 232–63. in JSTOR, historiography.
- Binnington, Ian. Confederate Visions: Nationalism, Symbolism, and the Imagined South in the Civil War. Charlottesville: University of Virginia Press, 2013. ISBN 978-0813935003.
- Blight, David W. Race and Reunion: The Civil War in American Memory. Cambridge, Massachusetts: Belknap Press of Harvard University Press, 2001.
- Boritt, Gabor S., ed. The Historian's Lincoln. Urbana: University of Illinois Press, 1988.
- Bresnahan, Jim, ed. Revisioning the Civil War: Historians on Counter-Factual Scenarios. Jefferson, North Carolina: McFarland & Company, Inc., 2006. ISBN 978-0786423927.
- Brown, Thomas J., ed. Remixing the Civil War: Meditations on the Sesquicentennial. Baltimore, Maryland: Johns Hopkins University Press, 2011. ISBN 978-1421402512.
- Catton, Bruce. Reflections on the Civil War. Edited by John Leekley. Garden City, NY: Doubleday & Company, Inc., 1981. ISBN 978-0385063470.
- Cook, Robert J. Troubled Commemoration: The Civil War Centennial, 1961–1965. Baton Rouge: Louisiana State University Press, 2007. ISBN 978-0807132272.
- Coske, John M. The Confederate Battle Flag: America's Most Embattled Emblem. Cambridge, Massachusetts: Harvard University Press, 2005.
- Connelly, Thomas L., The Marble Man. Robert E. Lee and His Image in American Society. New York: Alfred A. Knopf, 1977.
- Cox, Karen L. Dixie's Daughters: The United Daughters of the Confederacy and the Preservation of Confederate Culture. Gainesville: University Press of Florida, 2003.
- Cushman, Stephen (2014). Belligerent Muse: Five Northern Writers and How They Shaped Our Understanding of the Civil War. UNC Press Books. ISBN 978-1469618784.; covers Lincoln, Walt Whitman, Sherman, Ambrose Bierce, and Joshua Lawrence Chamberlain.
- Donald, David ed. Why the North Won the Civil War. 1977. ISBN 0020316607.
- Foner, Eric et al. "Talking Civil War History: A Conversation with Eric Foner and James McPherson," Australasian Journal of American Studies (2011) 30#2 pp. 1–32 in JSTOR
- Foner, Eric. "The Causes of the American Civil War: Recent Interpretations and New Directions." In Beyond the Civil War Synthesis: Political Essays of the Civil War Era, edited by Robert P. Swieringa. 1975.
- Fuller, Randell. From Battlefields Rising: How the Civil War Transformed American Literature. New York: Oxford University Press, 2011. ISBN 978-0195342307.
- Gallagher, Gary W. The Civil War at Chapel Hill: The University of North Carolina Press and the Great American Conflict. Wilmington: Broadfoot, 1989.
- Gallagher, Gary W. Lee & His Army in Confederate History. Chapel Hill: University of North Carolina Press, 2001. ISBN 978-0807857694.
- Gallagher, Gary W. Lee and His Generals in War and Memory. Baton Rouge: Louisiana State University Press, 1998. ISBN 0807129585.
- Gallagher, Gary W. and Alan T. Nolan, editors. The Myth of the Lost Cause and Civil War History. Bloomington: Indiana University Press, 2000.
- Goldfield, David. Still Fighting the Civil War: The American South and Southern History. Baton Rouge: Louisiana State University Press, 2002.
- Hartwig, D. Scott. The Battle of Antietam and the Maryland Campaign of 1862: A Bibliography. Westport, Connecticut: Meckler, 1990.
- Hattaway, Herman. Reflections of a Civil War Historian: Essays on Leadership, Society, and the Art of War. Columbia: University of Missouri Press, 2004.
- Janney, Caroline E. Burying the Dead but Not the Past: Ladies' Memorial Associations and the Lost Cause. Chapel Hill: University of North Carolina Press, 2008.
- Lawson, Melinda. Patriot Fires: Forging a New American Nationalism in the Civil War North. Lawrence: University Press of Kansas, 2002.
- Mackowski, Chris and Kristopher D. White. The Story Behind the Personal Memoirs of Ulysses S. Grant. Savas Beatie, LLC, 2013. ISBN 978-1611211603.
- Marshall, Anne E. Creating Confederate Kentucky: The Lost Cause and Civil War Memory in a Border State. Chapel Hill: University of North Carolina Press, 2010. ISBN 978-0807834367.
- Martinez, J. Michael, William D. Richardson, and Ron Me Ninch-Su, editors. Confederate Symbols in the Contemporary South. Gainesville: University Press of Florida, 2000.
- McMurry, Richard M. The Fourth Battle of Winchester: Towards a New Civil War Paradigm. Kent, Ohio: Kent State University Press, 2002.
- Neely, Jr., Mark E. The Civil War and the Limits of Destruction. Cambridge, Massachusetts: Harvard University Press, 2007.
- Onuf, Nicholas and Peter Onuf. Nations, Muskets, and War: Modern History and the American Civil War. Charlottesville: University of Virginia Press, 2006.
- Osterweis, Rollin G. The Myth of the Lost Cause, 1865–1900. Hamden, Connecticut: Archon, 1973.
- Panabaker, James. Shelby Foote and the Art of History: Two Gates to the City. Knoxville: University of Tennessee Press, 2004.
- Pressly, Thomas. Americans Interpret Their Civil War. Princeton, New Jersey: Princeton University Press, 1966.
- Prince, L. Michael. Rally 'Round the Flag, Boys!: South Carolina and the Confederate Flag. Columbia: University of South Carolina Press, 2004.
- Ritter, Charles F., and Jon L. Wakelyn, eds., Leaders of the American Civil War: A Biographical and Historiographical Dictionary (1998) short biographies and valuable historiographical summaries.
- Ross, Charles. Civil War Acoustic Shadow. Shippensburg, Pennsylvania: White Mane Books, 2001.
- Rubin, Anne Sarah. Through the Heart of Dixie: Sherman's March and American Memory (U of North Carolina Press, 2014). ISBN 978-1469617770.
- Smith, John David. "Whither Kentucky Civil War and Reconstruction Scholarship?." Register of the Kentucky Historical Society 112.2 (2014): 223–247. online
- Tulloch, Hugh. The Debate on the American Civil War Era. 1999.
- Varney, Frank P. General Grant and the Rewriting of History: How the Destruction of General William S. Rosecrans Influenced Our Understanding of the Civil War. Savas Beatie, LLC, 2013. ISBN 978-1611211184.
- Warren, Craig. Scars to Prove It: The Civil War Soldiers and American Fiction. Kent, Ohio: Kent State University Press, 2009. ISBN 978-1606350157.
- Watchell, Cynthia. War No More: The Antiwar Impulse on American Literature, 1861–1914. Baton Rouge: Louisiana State University Press, 2010. ISBN 978-0807135624.
- Woodworth, Steven E., ed. (1996). The American Civil War: A Handbook of Literature and Research. Greenwood Publishing. p. 208. ISBN 978-0313290190., the standard summary of the historiography.

== Surveys and reference books ==
- American Annual Cyclopaedia for 1861 (N.Y.: Appleton's, 1864), an extensive collection of reports on each state, Congress, and military activities, and many other topics; annual issues from 1861 to 1901
- Appletons' annual cyclopedia and register of important events: Embracing political, military, and ecclesiastical affairs; public documents; biography, statistics, commerce, finance, literature, science, agriculture, and mechanical industry, Volume 3 1863 (1864), thorough coverage of the events of 1863
- Axelrod, Alan. The Complete Idiot's Guide to the Civil War. Indianapolis, Indiana: Alpha Books, 2004.
- Barney, William L. The Oxford Encyclopedia of the Civil War. New York: Oxford University Press, 2011. ISBN 978-0199782017.
- Beringer, Richard E., Archer Jones, and Herman Hattaway, Why the South Lost the Civil War 1986; also, The Elements of Confederate Defeat: Nationalism, War Aims, and Religion (1988), abridged version.
- Blair, Jayne E. The Essential Civil War: A Handbook to the Battles, Armies, Navies, and Commanders. Jefferson, North Carolina: McFarland & Co., 2006.
- Bordewich, Fergus M. Congress at War: How Republican Reformers Fought the Civil War, Defied Lincoln, Ended Slavery, and Remade America. New York: Knopf, 2020.
- Bouton, Edward. Events of the Civil War. Miami, FL: Hardpress Publishing, 2012.
- Campaigns of the Civil War, New York: Scribner, in 15 volumes:
1. John G. Nicolay (1881), The Outbreak of Rebellion, reprint, New York: Da Capo, 1995.
2. Manning Force (1881), From Fort Henry to Corinth.
3. Alexander S. Webb (1881), The Peninsular: McClellan's Campaign of 1862.
4. John Codman Ropes (1881), The Army under Pope.
5. James Russell Soley (1883), The Blockade and the Cruisers.
6. Francis Winthrop Palfrey (1885), The Antietam and Fredericksburg, reprint, New York: Da Capo, 1996.
7. Abner Doubleday (1882), Chancellorsville and Gettysburg, reprints, New York: Da Capo, 1994, and Saint Petersburg, FL: Red and Black, 2009.
8. Henry M. Cist (1882), The Army of the Cumberland.
9. Francis Vinton Greene (1882), The Mississippi.
10. Daniel Ammen (1883), The Atlantic Coast.
11. Jacob Dolson Cox (1882), Atlanta, reprint, retitled as Sherman's Battle for Atlanta, New York: Da Capo, 1994.
12. Jacob Dolson Cox, (1882), The March to the Sea, Franklin and Nashville, reprint, retitled as Sherman's March to the Sea, Hood's Tennessee Campaign and the Carolina Campaigns of 1865, New York: Da Capo, 1994.
13. George Edward Pond (1882), The Shenandoah Valley in 1864.
14. Andrew A. Humphreys (1883), The Virginia Campaign of '64 and '65: The Army of the Potomac and the Army of the James, reprint, New York: Da Capo, 1995.
15. Alfred Thayer Mahan (1883), The Gulf and Inland Waters.
- Catton, Bruce. The Picture History of the Civil War. New York: American Heritage, 1960. ISBN 0828103054.
- Catton, Bruce. The Centennial History of the Civil War. 3 volumes. Garden City, NY: Doubleday, 1961–1965. OCLC 445159.
1. Catton, Bruce. The Centennial History of the Civil War. Vol. 1, The Coming Fury. Garden City, NY: Doubleday, 1961. ISBN 0641685254.
2. Catton, Bruce. The Centennial History of the Civil War. Vol. 2, Terrible Swift Sword. Garden City, NY: Doubleday, 1963. ISBN 0385026145.
3. Catton, Bruce. The Centennial History of the Civil War. Vol. 3, Never Call Retreat. Garden City, NY: Doubleday, 1965. ISBN 0671469908.
- Catton, Bruce. This Hallowed Ground: The Story of the Union Side of the Civil War 1956.
- Cooper, Charles R. Chronological and Alphabetical Record of the Engagements of the Great Civil War. Milwaukee, Wisconsin: The Caston Press, 1904.
- Cooper, Jr., William J. and John M. McCardell, Jr. In the Cause of Liberty: How the Civil War Redefined American Ideals. Baton Rouge: Louisiana State University Press, 2009.
- Copley, Richard L. The Civil War: A History in 3-D. Copleys Graphics LLC, 2009.
- Cozzens, Peter, ed. Battles & Leaders of the Civil War, volume 5. Urbana: University of Illinois Press, 2002. ISBN 0252024044.
- Cozzens, Peter, ed. Battles & Leaders of the Civil War, volume 6. Urbana: University of Illinois Press, 2004. ISBN 0252028791.
- Davis, William C. The Battlefields of the Civil War. Norman, Oklahoma: University of Oklahoma Press, 2000. ISBN 0806128828.
- Davis, William C. The Imperiled Union, 1861–1865, three volumes, 1983.
- Denney, Robert E. The Civil War Years: A Day-by-Day Chronicle. New York: Sterling Publishing Co., Inc., 1992. ISBN 978-0-8069-8519-0.
- Doyle, Don H. The Cause of All Nations: An International History of the American Civil War. New York: Basic Books, 2015. ISBN 978-0465029679.
- Draper, John William. History of the American Civil War, three volumes. New York: Harper and Brothers, 1870.
- Eaton, Clement. History of the Southern Confederacy. New York: The MacMillan Company, 1954.
- Evans, Clement A., ed. (1899). Confederate Military History, twelve volumes. Atlanta, Georgia: Confederate Publishing Co.
  - Volume I – Secession and Civil History of the Confederate States
  - Volume II – Maryland and West Virginia
  - Volume III – Virginia by Jedediah Hotchkiss
  - Volume IV – North Carolina by D. H. Hill, Jr.
  - Volume V – South Carolina by Ellison Capers
  - Volume VI – Georgia
  - Volume VII – Alabama and Mississippi
  - Volume VIII – Tennessee
  - Volume IX – Kentucky and Missouri
  - Volume X – Louisiana and Arkansas
  - Volume XI – Texas and Florida
  - Volume XII – Military and Post War History
- Denney, Robert E. The Civil War Years: A Day-by-Day Chronicle. New York: Gramercy Books, 1992. ISBN 0517189453.
- Eicher, David J. The Longest Night: A Military History of the Civil War. New York: Simon & Schuster, 2001. ISBN 978-0684849447.
- Faust, Patricia L. (ed.) Historical Times Illustrated Encyclopedia of the Civil War 1986. ISBN 0061812617.
- Fishel, Edwin C. The Secret War for the Union: The Untold Story of Military Intelligence in the Civil War. Boston: Houghton Mifflin, 1996.
- Foote, Shelby. The Civil War: A Narrative. 3 vols. New York: Random House, 1974. ISBN 0394749138.
1. Foote, Shelby. The Civil War: A Narrative. Vol. 1, Fort Sumter to Perryville. New York: Random House, 1958. ISBN 0394495179.
2. Foote, Shelby. The Civil War: A Narrative. Vol. 2, Fredericksburg to Meridian. New York: Random House, 1958. ISBN 0394495179.
3. Foote, Shelby. The Civil War: A Narrative. Vol. 3, Red River to Appomattox. New York: Random House, 1974. ISBN 0394749138.
- Ford, Lacy K., ed. A Companion to the Civil War and Reconstruction. Blackwell, 2005.
- Gallagher, Gary. The Confederate War. Cambridge, Massachusetts: Harvard University Press, 1998.
- Gallagher, Gary W. The Union War. New York: Harvard University Press, 2011. ISBN 978-0674045620.
- Gallagher, Gary W., Stephen Engle, Robert Krick, and Joseph Glatthaar. The American Civil War: This Mighty Scourge of War. United Kingdom: Osprey Publishing, 2003.
- Gibboney, Douglas Lee: Tragic Glory: A Concise, Illustrated History of the Civil War. Fredericksburg, Virginia: Sergeant Kirkland's, 1997. ISBN 1887901175.
- Goldfield, David. America Aflame: How the Civil War Created a Nation. Bloomsbury Press, 2011.
- Goodheart, Adam. 1861: The Civil War Awakening. New York: Vintage Books, 2011. ISBN 978-1400032198.
- Guelzo, Allen C. Fateful Lightning: A New History of the Civil War & Reconstruction. New York: Oxford University Press, 2012. ISBN 978-0199843282.
- Hannings, Bud. Every Day of the Civil War: A Chronological Encyclopedia. Jefferson, North Carolina: McFarland, 2010.
- Hattaway, Herman, and Archer Jones. How the North Won: A Military History of the Civil War. Urbana, Illinois: University of Illinois Press, 1983. ISBN 0252009185.
- Hattaway, Herman. Shades of Blue and Gray: An Introductory Military History of the Civil War. Columbia: University of Missouri Press, 1997.
- Heidler, David S., and Jeanne T. Seidler, editors. Encyclopedia of the American Civil War: A Political, Social and Military History. New York: W. W. Norton & Co., 2002.
- Holzer, Harold, and Sara Vaughn Gabbard. 1865: America Makes War and Peace in Lincoln's Final Year (Southern Illinois University Press, 2015). viii, 199 pp.
- Hughes, Mark. The New Civil War Handbook: Facts and Photos for Readers of All Ages. Savas Beatie, LLC, 2009. ISBN 1932714626.
- Hummel, Jeffrey Rogers. Emancipating Slaves, Enslaving Free Men: A History of the American Civil War. Chicago: Open Court, 1996.
- Johnson, Robert Underwood and Clarence C. Buel, eds. Battles and Leaders of the Civil War. 4 volumes. New York: Century Co., 1884–1888. OCLC 2048818. Later edition: New York: Castle Books, 1956.
1. From Sumter to Shiloh.
2. North to Antietam.
3. Retreat from Gettysburg.
4. The Way to Appomattox.
- Jones, Robert H. Disrupted Decades: The Civil War and Reconstruction Years. New York: Charles Scribner's Sons, 1973.
- Kagan, Neil, and Stephen G. Hyslop. National Geographic Atlas of the Civil War: A Comprehensive Guide to the Tactics and Terrain of Battle. Washington D.C.: National Geographic, 2008. ISBN 978-1426203473.
- Keegan, John. The Civil War: A Military History, New York: Alfred A. Knopf, 2010.
- Kennedy, Frances H. (editor) The Civil War Battlefield Guide, 2nd ed.. New York: The Conservation Fund, 1998. ISBN 0395740126.
- Long, E. B. The Civil War Day by Day: An Almanac 1861–1865. Garden City, New York: Doubleday & Company, Inc., 1971.
- Lowry, Don. Dark and Cruel War: The Decisive Months of the Civil War, September–December 1864. New York: Hippocrene Books, 1993.
- Lowry, Thomas P. A Thousand Stories You Didn't Know About the Civil War. No place of publication: published by the author, 2014.
- Marten, James and A. Kristen Foster. More Than a Contest Between Armies: Essays on the Civil War Era. Kent, Ohio: Kent State University Press, 2008.
- Masur, Louis P. The Civil War: A Concise History. New York: Oxford University Press, 2011.
- McPherson James M. The Atlas of the Civil War. Philadelphia: Running Press Book Publishers, 2005. ISBN 978-0762423569.
- McPherson James M. Fields of Fury: The American Civil War. New York: Bryon Press Visual Publications, Inc., 2002.
- McPherson James M. Ordeal by Fire: the Civil War and Reconstruction. (1992), uses modernization interpretation; the text is different from his Battle Cry book
- Mitchell, Joseph B. Military Leaders in the Civil War. New York: G.P. Putnam's Sons, 1972.
- Mosocco, Ronald A. The Chronological Tracking of the American Civil War per the Official Records of the War of the Rebellion. Williamsburg, Va: James River Publications, 1994.
- Nevins, Allan. Ordeal of the Union, an 8-volume set (1947–1971).
1. Fruits of Manifest Destiny, 1847–1852
2. A House Dividing, 1852–1857
3. Douglas, Buchanan, and Party Chaos, 1857–1859
4. Prologue to Civil War, 1859–1861
5. The Improvised War, 1861–1862
6. War Becomes Revolution, 1862–1863
7. The Organized War, 1863–1864
8. The Organized War to Victory, 1864–1865
- Miller, Francis T., ed. The Photographic History of the Civil War, ten volumes. New York: Review of Reviews, 1912.
- Olson, Christopher J. The American Civil War: A Hands-On History. New York: Hill & Wang, 2006.
- Pollard, Edwin. The First Year of the War. Richmond, Virginia: West and Johnston, 1862.
- Rhodes, James Ford. History of the United States from the Compromise of 1850 (1920 and numerous editions) five volumes.
- Rhodes, James Ford. A History of the Civil War, 1861–1865 (Pulitzer Prize winner).
- Shotwell, Walter. The Civil War in America. New York: Longmans, Green and Company, 1923.
- Stoddard, Brooke C., and Daniel P. Murphy. The Everything Civil War Book. New York: Everything Books, 2009.
- Swinton, William. The Twelve Decisive Battles of the Civil War. New York: Dick and Fitzgerald, 1867.
- Symonds, Craig L. A Battlefield Atlas of the Civil War. Annapolis, Maryland: The Nautical and Aviation Publishing Company of America, 1983. ISBN 0933852401.
- Thomas, Emory M. The American War and Peace, 1860–1877. Englewood Cliffs, New Jersey: Prentice–Hall, Inc., 1973.
- Trudeau, Noah Andre. Out of the Storm: The End of the Storm, April–June 1865. Boston: Little, Brown and Company, 1994. ISBN 0316853283.
- Varon, Elizabeth. Disunion: The Coming of the American Civil War 1789–1859. Chapel Hill: University of North Carolina Press, 2009.
- Wagner, Margaret E. Gary W. Gallagher, and Paul Finkelman, eds. The Library of Congress Civil War Desk Reference. 2002.
- Weigley, Russell F. A Great Civil War: A Military and Political History, 1861–1865. Bloomington: Indiana University Press, 2000.
- Wink, Jay. April 1865: The Month That Saved America. New York: HarperCollins, 2006. ISBN 978-0060899684. First published 2001.
- Woodworth, Steven E., and Kenneth J. Winkle. Oxford Atlas of the Civil War. New York: Oxford University Press, 2004. ISBN 0195221311.
- Wooster, Robert. The Civil War Bookshelf: 50 Must-Read Books About the War Between the States. New York: Citadel Press, Kensington Publishing Corp., 2001. ISBN 0806526920.
- Wright, John D., editor. Oxford Dictionary of Civil War Quotations. New York: Oxford University Press, 2006.
- Wright, Mike. What They Didn't Teach You About the Civil War. Novato, California: Presidio Press, 1997.

For the most recent surveys see:

- Guelzo, Allen C. Fateful Lightning: A New History of the Civil War & Reconstruction. New York: Oxford University Press, 2012. ISBN 978-0199843282.
- Fellman, Michael et al. This Terrible War: The Civil War and its Aftermath (2nd. ed. 2007).
- Eicher, David J. The Longest Night: A Military History of the Civil War. New York: Simon & Schuster, 2001. ISBN 978-0684849447.
- Donald, David et al. The Civil War and Reconstruction. 2001.
- McPherson, James M. Battle Cry of Freedom: The Civil War Era. New York: Oxford University Press, 1988. ISBN 978-0195038637.
- Sheehan-Dean, Aaron, ed. A Companion to the U.S. Civil War . New York: Wiley Blackwell, 2014. ISBN 978-1444351316. 2 vol. 1232 pp; 64 topical chapters by experts; emphasis on historiography.

== Maps, photographs, environment ==
- Adelman, Gary E. and John J. Richter, editors. Ninety-Nine Historic Images of Civil War Washington. Washington, D.C.: The Center for Civil War Photography and the Civil War Preservation Trust, 2006.
- Brady, Lisa M. "The Wilderness of War: Nature and Strategy in the American Civil War," Environmental History 10, no. 3 (July 2005): 421–447
- Brady, Lisa M. War upon the Land: Military Strategy and the Transformation of Southern Landscapes during the American Civil War (Environmental History and the American South) (2012) excerpt and text search
- Browning, Judkin and Timothy Silver. An Environmental History of the Civil War (2020) online review
- Davis, William C., Bell I. Wiley and The National Historical Society. The Image of War, 1861–1865, 6 volumes. Garden City, New York: Doubleday, 1981–1984. ISBN 978-0385154666.
1. Volume I: Shadows of the storm.. Garden City, New York: Doubleday, 1981. ISBN 978-0385154666.
2. Volume II: The Guns of '62. Garden City, New York: Doubleday, 1982. ISBN 978-0385154673.
3. Volume III: The Embattled Confederacy. Garden City, New York: Doubleday, 1982. ISBN 978-0385154680.
4. Volume IV: Fighting for Time. Garden City, New York: Doubleday, 1983. ISBN 978-0385182805.
5. Volume V: The South Besieged. Garden City, New York: Doubleday, 1983. ISBN 978-0385182812.
6. Volume VI: The End of an Era. Garden City, New York: Doubleday, 1984. ISBN 978-0385182829.
- Davis, William C., William A. Frassanito and The National Historical Society. Touched by Fire: A Photographic Portrait of the Civil War. 2 volumes. Boston: Little Brown and Company, 1985–1986.
1. Davis, William C. and William A. Frassanito. Touched by Fire: A Photographic Portrait of the Civil War. Volume One. Boston: Little Brown and Company, 1985. ISBN 978-0316176613.
2. Davis, William C. and William A. Frassanito. Touched by Fire: A Photographic Portrait of the Civil War. Volume Two. Boston: Little Brown and Company, 1986. ISBN 978-0316176644.
- Drake, Brian Allen, ed. The Blue, the Gray, and the Green: Toward an Environmental History of the Civil War (University of Georgia Press; 2015) 250 pages; Scholarly essays examining climate, disease & landscape issues.
- Esposito, Vincent J. (1959). West Point Atlas of American Wars. Vol. 1: 1689–1900 (1st ed.). New York: Frederick A. Praeger Publishers. OCLC 5890637.
- Gallman, James Matthew, Gary W. Gallagher. Lens of War: Exploring Iconic Photographs of the Civil War. University of Georgia Press; 2015.
- Gottfried, Bradley M. The Maps of First Bull Run: An Atlas of the First Bull Run (Manassas) Campaign, including the Battle of Ball's Bluff, June–October 1861. New York: Savas Beatie, 2009. ISBN 978-1932714609.
- Gottfried, Bradley M. The Maps of Gettysburg: An Atlas of the Gettysburg Campaign, June 3–13, 1863. New York: Savas Beatie, 2007. ISBN 978-1932714302.
- Guernsey, Alfred H. and Henry M. Alden, editors. Harper's Pictorial History of the Great Rebellion, two volumes. Chicago, Illinois: McDonnell Brothers, 1868.
- Imhof, John D. Gettysburg: Day Two – A Study In Maps. Baltimore, Maryland: Butternut & Blue, 1999. ISBN 0935523707.
- Krick, Robert K. Civil War Weather in Virginia. Tuscaloosa, Alabama: University of Alabama Press, 2007.
- O'Shea, Richard. American Heritage Battle Maps of the Civil War. Tulsa, Oklahoma: Council Oak Books, 1992. ISBN 0933031718.
- Swanson, Mark. Atlas of the Civil War: Month By Month. U. of Georgia Press, 2004. 141 pp.
- Symonds, Craig L. A Battlefield Atlas of the Civil War. Annapolis, Maryland: The Nautical and Aviation Publishing Company of America, 1983. ISBN 0933852401.
- Ward, Geoffrey C. The Civil War (1990), based on PBS series by Ken Burns; visual emphasis
- Woodhead, Henry, ed. Echoes of Glory: Illustrated Atlas of the Civil War. Alexandria, Virginia: Time–Life Books, 1991. ISBN 0809488582.

=== Bibliographies ===
- Barbuto, Domenica M. and Martha Kreisel. Guide to Civil War Books: An Annotated Selection of Modern Works on the War Between the States. Chicago, Illinois: American Library Association, 1996.
- Broadfoot, Thomas. Civil War Books: A Priced Checklist, 5th ed., Wilmington, North Carolina: Broadfoot Publishing Co., 2000.
- Cole, Harold L. Civil War Eyewitnesses: An Annotated Bibliography of Books and Articles, 1955–1986. Columbia: University of South Carolina Press, 1988.
- Dornbusch, Charles E. Military Bibliography of the Civil War, three volumes. New York: New York Public Library, 1971–87; fourth volume, Dayton, Ohio: Press of Morningside, 1994.
- Dozier, Graham T., comp. Virginia's Civil War: A Guide to Manuscript Collections at the Virginia Historical Society. Richmond: Virginia Historical Society, 1998.
- Eicher, David J. The Civil War in Books: An Analytical Bibliography. Urbana: University of Illinois Press, 1997.
- Freeman, Frank R. Microbes and Minie Balls: An Annotated Bibliography of Civil War Medicine. New Brunswick, New Jersey: Fairleigh–Dickinson University Press, 1995.
- Harwell, Richard. The Confederate Hundred: A Bibliographic Selection of Confederate Books. Urbana, Illinois: Beta Phi Mu, 1964.
- Kelsey, Marie Ellen, compiler. Ulysses S. Grant: A Bibliography. Westport, Connecticut: Praeger, 2005.
- Meredith, Lee W. Guide to Civil War Periodicals, two volumes. Twentynine Palms, California: Historical Indexes, 1991 and 1996.
- Murdock, Eugene C. The Civil War in the North: A Selective Annotated Bibliography. New York: Garland Publishing, 1987.
- Nagle, Robert. Further Readings on Civil War Fiction. An online annotated bibliography of fiction and literary essays about the Civil War, from the 19th century to the present. First published as an appendix in the ebook Soldier Boys: Tales of the Civil War by author Jack Matthews, 2016.
- Ryan, Daniel J. The Civil War Literature of Ohio. Cleveland, Ohio: Burrows Brothers Company, 1911.
- Sauers, Richard A. The Gettysburg Campaign, June 3 – August 1, 1863: A Comprehensive, Selectively Annotated Bibliography. Westport, Connecticut: Greenwood Press, 1982.
- Seagrave, Ronald R. Civil War Books – Confederate and Union: A Bibliography and Price Guide. Fredericksburg, Virginia: Sergeant Kirkland's Museum and Historical Society, 1995.
- Smith, David R. The Monitor and the Merimac: A Bibliography. Los Angeles: 1968.
- Smith, Jr., Myron J. American Civil War Navies: A Bibliography. Metuchen, New Jersey: The Scarecrow Press, Inc., 1972.
- United States War Department. Bibliography of State Participation in the Civil War. Washington, D.C.: 1913.
- Westcote, Walter. Books on the American Civil War Era: A Critical Bibliography. El Dorado Hills, California: Savas Beatie Publishing. 2017.
- Woodworth, Steven E., ed. The American Civil War: A Handbook of Literature and Research. Westport, Connecticut: Greenwood Press, 1996.
- Wright, John H. Compendium of the Confederacy: An Annotated Bibliography, two volumes. Broadfoot Publishing Company, 1989.

== Newspapers in the Civil War ==
- The Most Fearful Ordeal: Original Coverage of the Civil War by Writers and Reporters of the New York Times. New York: St. Martin's Press, 2004.
- Andrews, J. Cutler. The North Reports the Civil War. Pittsburgh, Pennsylvania: University of Pittsburgh Press, 1955.
- Andrews, J. Cutler. The South Reports the Civil War. Princeton, New Jersey: Princeton University Press, 1970.
- Cortissoz, Royal. The Life of Whitelaw Reid, two volumes. New York: Scribners, 1921.
- Harris, Brayton. War News Blue and Gray in Black and White: Newspapers in the Civil War.
- Holzer, Harold. Lincoln and the Power of the Press: The War for Public Opinion. New York: Simon & Schuster, 2014.
- Holzer, Harold, and Craig L. Symonds, editors. The New York Times Complete Civil War 1861–1865. New York: Black Dog and Leventhal Publishers, 2010.
- Marszalek, John F. Sherman's Other War: The General and the Civil War Press. Kent, Ohio: Kent State University Press, 1999.
- Munson, E.B., ed. Confederate Correspondent: The Civil War Reports of Jacob Nathaniel Raymer, Fourth North Carolina. Jefferson, North Carolina: McFarland Publishers, 2009.
- Perry, James M. A Bohemian Brigade: The Civil War Correspondents – Mostly Rough, Sometimes Ready. New York: John Wiley & Sons, 2000.
- Reynolds, Donald F. Editors Make War: Southern Newspapers in the Secession Crisis. Nashville, Tennessee: Vanderbilt University Press, 1966.
- Smart, James G., ed. A Radical View: The "Agate" Dispatches of Whitelaw Reid, 1861–1865, two volumes. Memphis, Tennessee: Memphis State University Press, 1976
- Starr, Louis M. Bohemian Brigade: Civil War Newsmen in Action. New York: Harcourt, Brace & Co., 1952.
- Stepp, John W. and I. William Hill, eds. and comps. Mirror of the War: The Washington Star Reports the Civil War. New York: Castle Books for The Evening Star Newspapers Company, 1961.
- Styple, William B. Writing & Fighting the Confederate War: The Letters of Peter Wellington Alexander, Confederate War Correspondent. Kearny, New Jersey: Belle Grove Publishing, 2002.

== Art and music ==
- Cornelius, Steven H. Music of the Civil War Era. Westport, Connecticut: Greenwood Press, 2004.
- Davis, James A. Music Along the Rapidan: Civil War Soldiers, Music, and Community during Winter Quarters, Virginia. Lincoln: University of Nebraska Press, 2014.
- Holzer, Harold and Mark E. Neely, Jr. Mine Eyes Have Seen the Glory: The Civil War in Art. New York: Orion Books, 1993.
- Jacobson, Doranne. The Civil War in Art: A Visual Odyssey. New York: SMITHMARK Publishers, 1996.
- Kelley, Bruce and Mark A. Snell. Bugle Resounding: Music and Musicians of the Civil War. Columbia: University of Missouri Press, 2004.
- Neely, Jr., Mark E., Harold Holzer, and Gabor S. Boritt. The Confederate Image: Prints of the Lost Cause. Chapel Hill: University of North Carolina Press, 1987.
- Sharp, Kevin, with contributions by Adam M. Thomas. Bold Cautious True: Walt WHitman and American Art of the Civil War Era. Memphis, Tennessee: The Dixon Gallery and Gardens, 2009.
- Zapata-Rodríguez, Melisa M. (2016). "Minstresy: Iconography of Resistance During the American Civil War". Music in Art: International Journal for Music Iconography. 41 (1–2): 111–127. ISSN 1522-7464.

== Popular culture, novels, films ==
- Brown, Thomas J. The Public Art of Civil War Commemoration: A Brief History with Documents. Boston and New York: Bedford/St. Martin's, 2004.
- Browne, Ray B. The Civil War and Reconstruction. American Popular Culture Through History, 2003.
- Cassidy, John M. Civil War Cinema: A Pictorial History of Hollywood and the War between the States. Missoula, Montana: Pictorial Histories Publishing Company, 1986.
- Cullen, Jim. The Civil War in Popular Culture: A Reusable Past. Washington, D.C.: Smithsonian Institution Press, 1995.
- Ehle, John Time of Drums. New York: Harper & Row, 1970. (historical fiction)
- Fahs, Alice, and Joan Waugh, eds. The Memory of the Civil War in American Culture. Chapel Hill: University of North Carolina Press, 2004.
- Gallagher, Gary W. Causes Won, Lost, and Forgotten: How Hollywood and Popular Art Shape What We Know about the Civil War. Chapel Hill: University of North Carolina Press, 2008. ISBN 978-0807832066.
- Holzer, Harold. Mine Eyes Have Seen The Glory: The Civil War in Art. New York: Orion Books, 1993.
- Hulbert, Matthew Christopher and John C. Inscoe, eds. Writing History With Lightning: Cinematic Representations of Nineteenth-Century America. Baton Rouge: Louisiana State University Press, 2019. ISBN 978-0807170465.
- Jones, Madison. Nashville 1864: The Dying of the Light. Nashville, Tennessee: J. S. Sanders & Company, 1997. ISBN 187994135X.
- Kinnard, Roy. The Blue and Gray on the Silver Screen: More than 80 Years of Civil War Movies. Secaucus, New York: Carol Publishing, 1996.
- McWhirter, Christian. Battle Hymns: The Power and Popularity of Music in the Civil War. Chapel Hill: University of North Carolina Press, 2012.
- Nagle, P. G. Glorieta Pass [a novel]. New York: Forge, 1999. ISBN 0312865481.
- Sears, Stephen W. American Heritage Century Collection of Civil War Art. New York, American Heritage Pub. Co., 1974.
- Sears, Stephen W., ed. Civil War: A Treasury of Art and Literature. Fairfield, Connecticut: Hugh Lauter Levin Associates, 1992.
- Sherbourne, James. The Way to Fort Pillow. Boston: Houghton Mifflin Company, 1972. (historical fiction)
- Spehr, Paul C., compiler. The Civil War in Motion Pictures: A Bibliography of Films Produced in the United States since 1897. Washington, D.C.: Library of Congress, 1961.
- Terman, Max R. Hiram's Honor: Reliving Private Terman's Civil War. Hillsboro, Kansas: Tesa Books, 2009.
- Terman, Max R. Hiram's Hope: The Return of Isaiah, Hillsboro, Kansas: M. R. Terman, 2014.
- Warren, Craig A. Scars to Prove It: The Civil War Soldier and American Fiction. Kent, Ohio: Kent State University Press, 2009.
- Wills, Brian Steel. Gone with the Glory: The Civil War in Cinema. Lanham, Maryland: Rowman & Littlefield, 2006.

== Tour guides ==
- (Anonymous) The Civil War Preservation Trust's Civil War Sites: The Official Guide to Battlefields, Monuments, and More. Old Saybrook, Connecticut: Globe Pequot Press, 2003.
- (no author listed) A Guide to the Fortifications and Battlefields Around Petersburg. Petersburg, Virginia: Daily Index Job Print, 1866.
- (no author listed) "Southern Battlefields": A List of Battlefields on and near the Lines of the Nashville, Chattanooga & St. Louis Railway and Western & Atlantic Railroad. Nashville, Tennessee: Nashville, Chattanooga & St. Louis Railway, no date listed.
- Bishop, Randy. Mississippi's Civil War Battlefields: A Guide to Their History and Preservation. Gretna, Louisiana: Pelican Publishing Company, Incorporated, 2010.
- Bowery, Jr. Charles R. and Ethan S. Rafuse, eds. Guide to the Richmond–Petersburg Campaign. The U. S. Army War College Guides to Civil War Battles. Lawrence: University Press of Kansas, 2014. ISBN 978-0700619597.
- Cahill, Lora Schmidt, and David L. Mowery. Morgan's Raid Across Ohio: The Civil War Guidebook of the John Hunt Morgan Heritage Trail. Edited by Edd Sharp and Michele Collins. Ohio Historical Society, 2013.
- Calkins, Chris M. From Petersburg to Appomattox: A Tour Guide to the Route's of Lee's Withdrawal and Grant's Pursuit, April 2 – 9, 1865. Farmville, Virginia: Farmville Herald, 1983.
- Civil War Preservation Trust. Civil War Sites: The Official Guide to Battlefields, Monuments, and More. Guilford, Connecticut: Globe Pequot Press, 2003.
- Dunkerly, Robert M., Donald C. Pfanz, and David R. Ruth. No Turning Back: A Guide to the 1864 Overland Campaign, from the Wilderness to Cold Harbor, May 4 – June 13, 1864. Savas Beatie, 2014. ISBN 978-1611211931.
- Johnson, Clint. Touring the Carolinas' Civil War Sites. Second Edition. Winston-Salem, NC: John F. Blair, Publisher, 2011 ISBN 978-0895874030.
- Johnson, Clint. Touring Virginia's and West Virginia's Civil War Sites. Winston-Salem, NC: John F. Blair, Publisher, 1999. ISBN 978-0895871848.
- Krumenaker, Lawrence. Walking the Line: Rediscovering and Touring the Civil War Defenses on Modern Atlanta's Landscape. Hermograph Press, 2014. ISBN 978-1930876071.
- Lee, Richard McGowan. General Lee's City: An Illustrated Guide to the Historic Sites of Confederate Richmond. EPM Publications, 1987.
- Miles, Jim. Paths to victory: a history and tour guide of the Stone's River, Chickamauga, Chattanooga, Knoxville, and Nashville Campaigns. Rutledge Hill Press, 1991.
- Miles, Jim. To the Sea: A History and Tour Guide of Sherman's March. Turner Publishing Company, 1999.
- Morgan, Bill. The Civil War Lover's Guide to New York City. Savas Beatie, LLC, 2013. ISBN 978-1611211221.
- Salmon, John S. The Official Virginia Civil War Battlefield Guide. Mechanicsburg, Pennsylvania: Stackpole Books, 2001.
- Shively, Julie. The Ideals Guide to American Civil War Places. Nashville, Tennessee: Ideals Publications, 1999.
- Spruill III, Matt, and Matt Spruill IV. Echoes of Thunder: A Guide to the Seven Days' Battles. Knoxville: University of Tennessee Press, 2006.
- Taylor, Paul. Discovering the Civil War in Florida: A Reader and Guide. Sarasota, Florida: Pineapple Press, Inc., 2001. ISBN 1561642347.
- Walk, Gregory. Friend and Foe Alike: A Tour Guide to Missouri's Civil War. St. Louis, Missouri: Missouri's Civil War Heritage Foundation, Inc., 2010, 2012. ISBN 0979948266
- Winter, William C. The Civil War in St. Louis: A Guided Tour. St. Louis, Missouri: Missouri Historical Society Press, 1994.
- Wright, Muriel H. and Leroy H Fischer. Civil War Sites in Oklahoma. Oklahoma City: Oklahoma Historical Society, 1967.
- Yates, Bowling C. Historical Guide for Kennesaw Mountain National Battlefield Park and Marietta, Georgia. No publisher listed, 1976.

== Monuments, battlefields, and battlefield preservation ==
- Baruch, Mildred C. and Ellen J. Beckman. Civil War Union Monuments. Washington, D.C.: Daughters of Union Veterans of the Civil War, 1978.
- Boge, Georgie and Margie Holder Boge. Paving Over the Past: A History and Guide to Civil War Battlefield Preservation. Montclair, New Jersey: G–2 Military History Specialists, 1993.
- Butler, Douglas J. North Carolina Civil War Monuments: An Illustrated History. Jefferson, North Carolina: McFarland & Company, Inc., 2013. ISBN 978-0786468560.
- Dillahunty, Albert. Shiloh National Military Park, Tennessee. Washington, D.C.: National Park Service, 1955.
- Emerson, Bettie A. C. Historic Southern Monuments: Representative Memorials of the Heroic Dead of the Southern Confederacy. New York and Washington, D.C.: Neale, 1911.
- Keefer, Bradley S. Conflicting Memories on the "River of Death": The Chickamauga Battlefield and the Spanish–American War, 1863–1933. Kent, Ohio: Kent State University Press, 2013. ISBN 978-1606351260.
- Linton, Roger C. Chickamauga: A Battlefield History in Images. University of Georgia Press, 2004. ISBN 0820323985.
- Neff, John R. Honoring the Civil War Dead: Commemoration and the Problem of Reconciliation. Lawrence, Kansas: University Press of Kansas, 2005.
- Reason, Akela. Politics and Memory: Civil War Monuments in Gilded Age New York. New Haven, Connecticut: Yale University Press, 2025. ISBN 978-0300256499
- Smith, Timothy B. This Great Battlefield of Shiloh: History, Memory, and the Establishment of a Civil War National Military Park. Knoxville, Tennessee: University of Tennessee Press, 2004.
- Widener, Jr., Ralph W. Confederate Monuments: Enduring Symbols of the South and the War Between the States. Washington, D.C.: Andromeda, 1982.
- Zenzer, Joan M. Battling for Manassas: The Fifty-Year Preservation Struggle at Manassas National Battlefield Park. University Park, Pennsylvania: Penn State University Press, 1998.

== Government publications ==
- U.S. War Dept., The War of the Rebellion: a Compilation of the Official Records of the Union and Confederate Armies and The War of the Rebellion: a Compilation of the Official Records of the Union and Confederate Armies (including the full Atlas), U.S. Government Printing Office, 1880–1901. 70 volumes of letters and reports written by both armies in 128 parts. ** Note: in 1902 a Volume of Additions and Corrections to the Official Records was published: A Compilation of the Official Records of the Union and Confederate Armies Additions and Corrections to General Index Volume, Serial No 130
- Report of the Committee on the Conduct of the War on the Attack on Petersburg on the 30th Day of July, 1864. Washington, D.C.: Government Printing Office, 1865.
- Illinois Adjutant General. Roster of Officers and Enlisted Men, nine volumes. Springfield, Illinois: 1900.
- Indiana Adjutant General. Report of the Adjutant General of the State of Indiana 1861–65, eight volumes. Indianapolis, Indiana: Holloway, 1865–66.
- Iowa Adjutant General. Roster and Record of Iowa Soldiers in the War of Rebellion, six volumes. Des Moines, Iowa: English, 1910.
- journal of the Congress of the Confederate States of America, 1861–1865, seven volumes. Washington, D.C.: Government Printing Office, 1904–1905.
- Kansas Adjutant General. Report of the Adjutant General of the State of Kansas 1861–65. Topeka, Kansas: Hudson, 1896.

== Primary sources ==
- Lincoln, Abraham (1989). Lincoln: Speeches and Writings (2 vol. Library of America ed.).
- Supplement to the Official Records of the Union and Confederate Armies, one hundred volumes. Wilmington, North Carolina: Broadfoot Publishing, 1993–2000.
- (no author listed) Letters of Captain Henry Richards of the Ninety-Third Ohio Infantry. Cincinnati, Ohio: Wrightson, 1883.
- Abbott, Henry L. Fallen Leaves: The Civil War Letters of Major Henry Livermore Abbott, edited by Robert Garth Scott. Kent, Ohio: Kent State University Press, 1991.
- Acken, J. Gregory, ed. Inside the Army of the Potomac: The Civil War Experience of Captain Francis Adams Donaldson. Mechanicsburg, Pennsylvania: Stackpole, 1998.
- Agassiz, George R., ed. Meade's Headquarters, 1863–1865: Letters of Colonel Theodore Lyman from the Wilderness to Appomattox. Salem, New Hampshire: Ayer, 1987.
- Alberts, Don E., ed. Rebels on the Rio Grande: The Civil War Journal of A. B. Peticolas. Albuquerque: University of New Mexico Press, 1984.
- Aldrich, C. Knight, ed. Quest for a Star: The Civil War Letters and Diaries of Colonel Francis T. Sherman of the 88th Illinois. Knoxville: University of Tennessee Press, 1999.
- Allen, Ujanirtus. Campaigning with "Old Stonewall": Confederate Captain Ujanirtus Allen's Letters to His Wife, edited by Randall Allen and Keith Bohannon. Baton Rouge: Louisiana State University Press, 1998.
- Anderson, Emphraim M. Memoirs, Historical and Personal: Including the Campaigns of the First Missouri Confederate Brigade. Saint Louis, Missouri: Times Printing, 1868.
- Anderson, Gary C. Through Dakota Eyes: Narrative Accounts of the Minnesota Indian War of 1862. Saint Paul: Minnesota Historical Society, 1988.
- Anderson, Mary Ann, ed. The Civil War Diary of Allen Morgan Geer, Twentieth Regiment, Illinois Volunteers. Denver: Robert C. Appleman, 1977.
- Anderson, William M., ed. We Are Sherman's Men: The Civil War Letters of Henry Orendorff. Macomb: Western Illinois University, 1986.
- Angle, Paul M., ed. Three Years in the Army of the Cumberland: The Letters and Diary of Major James A. Connolly. Bloomington: Indiana University Press, 1959.
- Ballard, Alfred. Gone for a Soldier: The Civil War Memoirs of Private Alfred Ballard, ed. by David Herbert Donald. Boston: Little, Brown, 1975.
- Banasik, Michael E., ed. Duty, Honor, and Country: The Civil War Experiences of Captain William P Black, Thirty–Seventh Illinois Infantry. Iowa City: Camp Pope Book Shop, 2006.
- Banasik, Michael E., ed. Missouri Brothers in Gray: The Reminiscences and Letters of William J. Bull and John P. Bull. Iowa City: Camp Pope Bookshop, 1998.
- Banasik, Michael E., ed. Reluctant Cannoneer: The Diary of Robert T. McMahan of the Twenty–Fifth Independent Ohio Light Artillery. Iowa City: Camp Pope Publishing, 1999.
- Banasik, Michael E., ed. Serving with Honor: The Diary of Captain Ethan Allen Pinnell of the Eighth Missouri Infantry. Iowa City: Camp Pope Bookshop, 1999.
- Barber, Raymond G., and Gary E. Swinson, eds. The Civil War Letters of Charles Barber, Private, 104th New York Volunteer Infantry. Torrance, California: Gary E. Swinson, 1991.
- Basler, Roy P., ed. The Collected Works of Abraham Lincoln, nine volumes. New Brunswick, New Jersey: Rutgers University Press, 1954.
- Bauer, K. Jack, ed. Soldiering: The Civil War Diary of Rice C. Bull, 123rd New York Volunteer Infantry. San Rafael, California: Presidio Press, 1977.
- Baumgartner, Richard A., ed. Blood & Sacrifice: The Civil War Journal of a Confederate Soldier. Huntington, West Virginia: Blue Acorn Press, 1994.
- Baxter, Nancy Niblack, ed. Hoosier Farm Boy in Lincoln's Army: The Civil War Letters of Pvt. John R. McClure. no place listed: privately published, 1971.
- Beale, Howare K., ed. Diary of Gideon Welles, three volumes. New York: W.W. Norton, 1960.
- Bearss, Edwin C., edr. A Louisiana Confederate: Diary of Felix Pierre Poche, translated by Eugenie Watson Somdal. Natchitoches, Louisiana: Northwestern State University, 1972.
- Beaudot, William J.K., and Lance J. Herdegen, eds. An Irishman in the Iron Brigade: The Civil War Memoirs of James P. Sullivan, Sergt., Company K. 6th Wisconsin Volunteers. New York: Fordham University Press, 1993.
- Bee, Robert L. The Boys from Rockville: Civil War Narratives of Sgt. Benjamin Hirst, Company D, 14th Connecticut Volunteers. Knoxville: University of Tennessee Press, 1998.
- Bender, Robert Patrick, edr. Worthy of the Cause for Which They Fought: The Civil War Diary of Brigadier General Harris Reynolds, 1861–1865. Fayetteville: University of Arkansas Press, 2011.
- Benedict, George Grenville. Army Life in Virginia: Letters from the Twelfth Vermont Regiment and Personal Experiences of Volunteer Service in the War for the Union, 1862–1863. Newport, Vermont: Tony O'Connor Civil War Enterprises, no date listed.
- Bennett, Stewart and Barbara Tillery, eds. The Struggle for the Life of the Republic: A Civil War Narrative by Brevet Major Charles Dana Miller, 76th Ohio Volunteer Infantry. Kent, Ohio: Kent State University Press, 2004.
- Benson, Evelyn Abraham. With the Army of West Virginia, 1861–1864: Reminiscences & Letters of Lt. James Abraham. Lancaster, Pennsylvania: published by the author, 1974.
- Benson, Richard H., ed. The Civil War Diaries of Charles E. Benson. Decorah, Iowa: Anundsen Publishing, 1991.
- Bergerson, Jr., Arthur W., editor. The Civil War Reminiscences of Major Silas T. Grisamore, C.S.A. Baton Rouge: Louisiana State University Press, 1993.
- Berkely, Henry Robinson. Four Years in the Confederate Artillery: The Diary of Private Henry Robinson Berkely, ed. by William H. Runge. Chapel Hill: University of North Carolina Press, 1961.
- Bird, Kermit Molyneux, ed. Quill of the Wild Goose: Civil War Letters and Diaries of Private Joel Molyneux, 141st P.V. Shippensburg, Pennsylvania: Burd Street Press, 1996.
- Blair, W.A., editor. A Politician Goes to War: The Civil War Letters of John White Geary. University Park: Pennsylvania State University Press, 1995.
- Blegen, Theodore C., ed. The Civil War Letters of Colonel Hans Christian Heg. Northfield, Minnesota: Norwegian American Historical Association, 1936.
- Bohrnstedt, Jennifer Cain, ed. Soldiering with Sherman: Civil War Letters of George F. Cram. DeKalb: Northern Illinois University Press, 2000.
- Brinkman, Harold D., ed. Dear Companion: The Civil War Letters of Silas I. Shearer. Davenport, Iowa: Harold D. Brinkman, 1995.
- Britton, Ann Hartwell and Thomas J. Reed, eds. To My Beloved Wife and Boy at Home: The Letters and Diaries of Orderly Sergeant John F. L. Hartwell. Madison, New Jersey: Fairleigh Dickinson University Press, 1997.
- Broadhead, Sallie M. The Diary of a Lady of Gettysburg, Pennsylvania, from June 15 to July 15, 1863. published by author, no date.
- Brown, Norman D., ed. Journey to Pleasant Hill: The Civil War Letters of Captain Elijah P. Petty, Walker's Texas Division, CSA. San Antonio: Institute of Texan Cultures, 1982.
- Brown, Norman D., ed. "One of Cleburne's Command": The Civil War Reminiscences and Diary of Capt. Samuel T. Foster, Granbury's Texas Brigade, CSA. Austin: University of Texas Press, 1980.
- Bruen, Ella Jane and Brian M. Fitzgibbons, eds. Through Ordinary Eyes: The Civil War Correspondence of Rufus Robbins, Private, 7th Regiment, Massachusetts Volunteers. Westport, Connecticut: Praeger, 2000.
- Buckingham, Peter H. All's For the Best: The Civil War Reminiscences and Letters of Daniel W. Sawtelle, Eighth Maine Volunteer Infantry. Knoxville: University of Tennessee Press, 2002.
- Bull, Rice C. Soldiering: The Civil War Diary of Rice C. Bull, 123rd New York Volunteer Infantry, edited by H. Jack Bauer. San Rafael, California: Presidio Press, 1977.
- Burg, B. R. Rebel at Large: The Diary of Confederate Deserter Philip Van Buskirk. Jefferson, North Carolina: McFarland, 2010.
- Butler, Watson Hubbard, ed. Letters Home: Jay Caldwell Butler, Captain, 101st Ohio Volunteer Infantry. no publisher listed, 1930.
- Cabaniss, Jim R., ed. Civil War Journal and Diary of Serg Washington Ives, 4th Florida, C.S.A. no publisher listed, 1987.
- Campbell, Eric A., ed. "A Grand Terrible Drama": From Gettysburg to Petersburg, The Civil War Letters of Charles Wellington Reed. New York: Fordham University Press, 2000.
- Campbell, R. Thomas, ed. Southern Service on Land & Sea: The Wartime Journal of Robert Watson, CSA/CSN. Knoxville: University of Tennessee Press, 2002.
- Carmony, Neil B., ed. The Civil War in Apacheland: Sergeant George Hand's Diary: California, Arizona, West Texas, New Mexico, 1861–1864. Silver City: High–Lonesome, 1996.
- Cassedy, Edward K., ed. Dear Friends at Home: The Civil War Letters and Diaries of Sergeant Charles T. Bowen Twelfth United States Infantry First Battalion, 1861–1864. Baltimore, Maryland: Butternut & Blue, 2001.
- Carter, Gari. Troubled State: Civil War Journals of Franklin Archibald Dick. Kirksville, Missouri: Truman State University Press, 2008.
- Carter, John D. "As It Was": Reminiscences of a Soldier of the Third Texas Cavalry and Nineteenth Louisiana Infantry, edited with introduction by T. Michael Parrish. Austin, Texas: State House Press, 1990.
- Chamberlayne, C. G., ed. Ham Chamberlayne – Virginian: Letters and Papers of an Artillery Officer in the War for Southern Independence, 1861–1865. Richmond, Virginia: Dietz Printing, 1932.
- Chapman, Sarah Bahnson, ed. Bright and Gloomy Days: The Civil War Correspondence of Captain Charles Frederic Bahnson, a Moravian Confederate. Knoxville: University of Tennessee Press, 2003.
- Child, William. Letters from a Civil War Surgeon: The Letters of Dr. William Child of the Fifth New Hampshire Volunteers. Solon, Maine: Polar Bear and Company, 2001.
- Christ, Mark K. "This Day We Marched Again": A Union Soldier's Account of War in Arkansas and the Trans–Mississippi. Little Rock: Butler Center for Arkansas Studies, 2014.
- Christ, Mark K. and Patrick G. Williams, eds. "I Do Wish This Cruel War Was Over": First–Person Accounts of Civil War Arkansas from the Arkansas Historical Quarterly. Fayetteville: University of Arkansas Press, 2014.
- Cockrell, Thomas D. and Michael B. Ballard, eds. A Mississippi Rebel in the Army of Northern Virginia: The Civil War Memoirs of Private David Holt. Baton Rouge: Louisiana State University Press, 2001.
- Coco, Gregory A., ed. From Ball's Bluff to Gettysburg … and Beyond: The Civil War Letters of Private Roland E. Bowen, 15th Massachusetts Infantry, 1861–1864. Gettysburg, Pennsylvania: Thomas, 1994.
- Commager, Henry Steele. The Blue and the Gray: The Story of the Civil War As Told by Participants. 2 vols. Indianapolis & New York: The Bobbs-Merrill Company, Inc., 1950. OCLC 633931399.
- Cotham, Edward T., ed. The Southern Journey of a Civil War Marine: The Illustrated Note–book of Henry O. Gusley. Austin: University of Texas Press, 2006.
- Cowper, Pulaski, ed. Extracts of Letters of Major-General Bryan Grimes, to his Wife. Wilmington, North Carolina: Broadfoot, 1986.
- Crary, Catherine S., ed. Dear Belle: Letters from a Cadet and Officer to His Sweetheart, 1858–1865. Middletown, Connecticut: Wesleyan University Press, 1965.
- Craven, Avery, ed. "To Markie": The Letters of Robert E. Lee to Martha Custis Williams. Cambridge, Massachusetts: Harvard University Press, 1933.
- Croffut, W.A., ed. Fifty Years in Camp and Field: A Diary of Ethan Allen Hitchcock, U.S.A. New York: G.P. Putnam's Sons, 1909.
- Crumb, Herb S., ed. The Eleventh Corps Artillery at Gettysburg: The Papers of Major Thomas Ward Osborn, Chief of Artillery. Hamilton, New York: Edmonston, 1991.
- Crumb, Herb S., and Katherine Dhalle, eds. No Middle Ground: Thomas Ward Osborn's Letters from the Field (1862–1864). Hamilton, New York: Edmonston, 1993.
- Cutrer, Thomas W., and T. Michael Parrish, editors. Longstreet's Aide: The Civil War Letters of Major Thomas J. Goree. Charlottesville: University of Virginia Press, 1955.
- Daly, Robert W., ed. Aboard the USS Monitor, 1862: The Letters of Acting Paymaster William Frederick Keeler. Annapolis, Maryland: 1964.
- Davis, James Henry, editor. Texans in Gray: A Regimental History of the Eighteenth Texas Infantry, Walker's Texas Division in the Civil War from the Firsthand Accounts by Sgt. John C. Porter, Col. Thos. G. Bonner and Col. William B. Ockiltree of the Eighteenth Texas Infantry. Tulsa, Oklahoma: Heritage Oak, 1999.
- Davis, William C. and Meredith L. Swentor, eds. Bluegrass Confederate: The Headquarters Diary of Edward O. Guerrant. Baton Rouge: Louisiana State University Press, 1999.
- Donald, David, ed. Inside Lincoln's Cabinet: The Civil War Diaries of Salmon P. Chase. New York: 1954.
- Dorsey, Sara A., ed. Recollections of Henry Watkins Allen, Brigadier General Confederate States Army, Ex–Governor of Louisiana. New York: M. Doolady, 1866.
- Doyer, Graham Ted. A Gunner in Lee's Army: The Civil War Letters of Thomas Henry Carter. Chapel Hill: University of North Carolina Press, 2014.
- Drickamer, Lee C., and Karen D. Drickamer, compilers/editors. Fort Lyon to Harpers Ferry: On the Border of North and South with "Rambling Jour", The Civil War Letters and Newspaper Dispatches of Charles H. Moulton (34th Mass. Vol. Inf.). Shippensburg, Pennsylvania: White Mane, 1987.
- Duncan, Russell, ed. Blue-Eyed Child of Fortune: The Civil War Letters of Colonel Robert Gould Shaw. Athens: University of Georgia Press, 1992.
- Dupree, Stephen A., ed. Campaigning with the Sixty–Seventh Indiana, 1864: An Annotated Diary of Service in the Department of the Gulf, William A. Macmillan, Diarist. New York: Iuniverse, 2006.
- Durkin, Joseph T., ed. Confederate Chaplain: A War Journal of Rev. James B. Sheeran, C.S.S.R., Fourteenth Louisiana, C.S.A. Milwaukee, Wisconsin: Bruce Publishing Company, 1960.
- Durnham, Rober S., ed. A Confederate Yankee: The Journal of Edward William Drummond, A Confederate Soldier from Maine. Knoxville: University of Tennessee Press, 2003.
- Durking, Joseph T. Confederate Chaplain: A War Journal of Rev. James B. Sheeran, C.SS.R., Fourteenth Louisiana, CSA. Milwaukee, Wisconsin: Bruce Publishing Company, 1960.
- Dwight, Eliza Amelia. Life and Letters of Wilder Dwight, Lieut. Col., Second Massachusetts Infantry Volunteers. Boston: Ticknor and Fields, 1868.
- Eby, Jr., Carl D. A Virginia Yankee in the Civil War: The Diaries of David Hunter Strother. Chapel Hill: University of North Carolina Press, 1961.
- Edwards, Whit, editor. The Prairie Was on Fire: Eyewitness Accounts of the Civil War in the Indian Territory. Oklahoma City: Oklahoma Historical Society, 2001.
- Eisenschiml, Otto; Ralph Newman; eds. The American Iliad: The Epic Story of the Civil War as Narrated by Eyewitnesses and Contemporaries (1947).
- Elder III, Donald C., ed. Love Amid the Turmoil: The Civil War Letters of William & Mary Vermilion. Iowa City: University of Iowa Press, 2003.
- Ellison, Janet C. and Mark A. Weitz, eds. On to Atlanta: The Civil War Diaries of John Hill Ferguson, Illinois Tenth Regiment of Volunteers. Lincoln: University of Nebraska Press, 2002.
- Emerson, W. Eric and Karen Stokes, eds. A Confederate Englishman: The Civil War Letters of Henry Wemyss Feilden. Columbia: University of South Carolina Press, 2013. ISBN 978-1611171358.
- Fitzhugh, Lester N., ed. Cannon Smoke: The Letters of Captain John J. Good. Hillsboro, Texas: Hill Junior College Press, 1971.
- Fleet, Betsy and John D.P. Fuller, eds. Green Mount: A Virginia Plantation Family during the Civil War; Being the Journal of Benjamin Robert Fleet and Letters of His Family. Lexington: University of Kentucky Press, 1962.
- Floyd, Dale E., ed. "Dear Friends at Home …": The Letters and Diaries of Thomas James Owen, Fiftieth New York Volunteer Engineer Regiment, during the Civil War. Washington, D.C.: Government Printing Office, 1985.
- Franklin, Ann York, ed. The Civil War Diaries of Capt. Alfred Tyler Fielder, 12th Tennessee Regiment Infantry, Company B, 1861–1865. Louisville, Kentucky: published by the author, 1996.
- Frano, Elizabeth Caldwell, comp. Letters of Captain Hugh Black to His Family in Florida during the War between the States, 1862–1864. Newburgh, Indiana: published by the author, 1998.
- Fry Laurie, ed. As Ever Your Own: The Civil War Letters of B. B. Sanborn. Arlington, Virginia: Naptime, 1997.
- Furry, William. The Precher's Tale: The Civil War Journal of Rev. Francis Springer, Chaplain, U.S. Army of the Frontier. Fayetteville: University of Arkansas Press, 2001.
- Garrett, Jill K., ed. Confederate Diary of Robert D. Smith. Columbia, Tennessee: Capt. Jamews Madison Sparkman Chapter, United Daughters of the Confederacy, 1975.
- Gates, Arnold, ed. The Rough Side of War: The Civil War Journal of Chesley A. Mosman, 1st Lieutenant, Company D, 59th Illinois Volunteer Infantry Regiment. Garden City, New York: Basin Publishing, 1987.
- Gavin, William Gilfillan, ed. Infantryman Pettit: The Civil War Letters of Corporal Frederick Pettit Late of Company C 100th Pennsylvania Veteran Volunteer Infantry Regiment "The Roundheads". Shippensburg, Pennsylvania: White Man, 1990.
- Giunta, Mary A., ed. A Civil War Soldier of Christ and Country: The Selected Correspondence of John Rodgers Meigs, 1859–1864. Champaign: University of Illinois Press, 2006.
- Goyne, Minetta A. Lone Star and Double Eagle: Civil War Letters of a German–Texas Family. Fort Worth: Texas Christian University Press, 1982
- Greiner, James M., Janet L. Coryell, and James R. Smither, eds. A Surgeon's Civil War: The Letters and Diaries of Daniel M. Holt, M.D. Kent, Ohio: Kent State University Press, 1994.
- Griffin, Richard N., ed. Three Years in the Saddle: The Diary and Newspaper Correspondence of Private George Perkins, Sixth New York Independent Battery, 1861–1864. Knoxville: University of Tennessee Press, 2006.
- Grimsley, Mark and Todd D. Miller, eds. The Union Must Stand: The Civil War Diary of John Quincy Adams Campbell, Fifth Iowa Volunteer Infantry. Knoxville: University of Tennessee Press, 2000.
- Hackemer, Kurt H., ed. To Rescue My Native Land: The Civil War Letters of William T. Shepherd, First Illinois Light Artillery. Knoxville: University of Tennessee Press, 2006.
- Hamlin, Percy Gatlin. "Old Bald Head" and the Making of a Soldier: Letters of General R.S. Ewell. Gaithersburg, Maryland: Ron R. Van Sickle Military Books, 1988.
- Hastings, William H., ed. Letters from a Sharpshooter: The Civil War Letters of Private William B. Greene, Co. G. 2nd United States Sharpshooters (Berdan's), Army of the Potomac, 1861–1865. Belleville, Wisconsin: Historic Publications, 1993.
- Hauptman, Laurence M., ed. A Seneca Indian in the Union Army: The Letters of Sergeant Isaac Newton Parker. Columbia, Maryland: White Mane Publishing Co., 1995.
- Hedrick, David T. and Gordon Barry Davis, Jr., eds. I'm Surrounded by Methodists: Diary of John H.W. Stuckenberg, Chaplain of the 145th Pennsylvania Volunteer Infantry. Gettysburg, Pennsylvania: Thomas Publications, 1995.
- Herberger, Charles F., ed. A Yankee at Arms: The Diary of Lieutenant Augustus D. Ayling, 29th Massachusetts Volunteers. Knoxville: University of Tennessee Press, 1989.
- Herdegen, Lance and Sherry Murphy, eds. Four Years with the Iron Brigade: The Civil War Journals of William R. Ray, Co. F., Seventh Wisconsin Infantry. Cambridge, Massachusetts: DaCapo Press, 2002.
- Hesseltine, William B. ed.; The Tragic Conflict: The Civil War and Reconstruction. 1962.
- Hester, James R., ed. A Yankee Scholar in Coastal South Carolina: William Francis Allen's Civil War Journals. University of South Carolina Press, 2015. ISBN 978-1611174960.
- Heth, Henry. The Memoirs of Henry Heth, ed. by James L. Morrison, Jr. Westport, Connecticut: Greenwood Press, 1974.
- Hewitt, Janet B. et al., eds. Supplement to the Official Records of the Union and Confederate Armies, 95 volumes. Wilmington, North Carolina: Broadfoot Publishing Co., 1994–99.
- Historic Fredericksburg Foundation, Inc. and the Central Rappahannock Heritage Center. The Circle Unbroken: The Civil War Letters of the Knox Family of Fredericksburg. Marceline, MO: Walsworth Print Group, 2013. ISBN 978-1578648610.
- Holcomb, Julie. Southern Sons, Northern Soldiers: The Civil War Letters of the Remley Brothers, 22nd Iowa Infantry. De Kalb: Northern Illinois University Press, 2004.
- Holden, Walter, William E. Ross, and Elizabeth Slomba, editors. Stand Firm and Fire Low: The Civil War Writings of Colonel Edward Cross. Hanover: University Press of New Hampshire, 2003.
- Howe, M.A. DeWolfe, ed. Marching with Sherman: Passages From the Letters and Campaign Diaries of Henry Hitchcock, Major and Assistant Adjutant General of Volunteers, November 1864 – May 1865. Lincoln: University of Nebraska Press, 1995.
- Howe, Mark De Wolfe, ed. Touched with Fire: The Civil War Letters and Diary of Oliver Wendell Holmes, Jr., 1861–1865. Cambridge, Massachusetts: Harvard University Press, 1947.
- Hubbart, Phillip A., ed. An Iowa Soldier Writes Home: The Civil War Letters of Union Private Daniel J. Parvin. Durham, North Carolina: Carolina Academic Press, 2991.
- Huff, Leo E., ed. The Civil War Letters of Albert Demuth and Roster Eight Missouri Volunteer Cavalry. Springfield, Missouri: Greene County Historical Society, 1997.
- Hughes, Jr., Nathaniel Cheairs, ed. The Civil War Memoir of Philip Daingerfield Stephenson, D.D. Conway: University of Central Arkansas Press, 1995.
- Hunter, Lloyd A., ed. "For Duty and Destiny": The Life and Civil War Diary of Hoosier Soldier and Educator William Taylor Stott. Indianapolis: Indiana Historical Society, 2010.
- Jackson, Joseph O., ed. "Some of the Boys …": The Civil War Letters of Isaac Jackson, 1862–1865. Carbondale: Southern Illinois University Press, 1960.
- Johnson, R. U., and Buel, C. C., eds., Battles and Leaders of the Civil War. 4 vols. New York, 1887–88.
- Johnson, Pharris Debach, compiler/editor. Under the Southern Cross: Soldier Life with Gordon Bradwell and the Army of Northern Virginia. Macon, Georgia: Mercer University Press, 1999.
- Joiner, Gary D., Marilyn S. Joiner, and Clifton D. Cardin, eds. "No Pardons to Ask, nor Apologies to Make": The Journal of William Henry King, Gray's Twenty–Eighth Louisiana Infantry Regiment. Knoxville: University of Tennessee Press, 2006.
- Jones, James P. and Edward F. Keuchel, eds. Civil War Marine: A Diary of the Red River Expedition, 1864. Washington, D.C.: History and Museums Division, U.S. Marine Corps, 1975.
- Jones, Mary Miles, and Leslie Jones Martin, eds. The Gentle Rebel: The Civil War Letters of 1st Lieutenant William Harvey Berryhill Co. D, 43rd Regiment Mississippi Volunteers. Yazoo City, Mississippi: Sassafras Press, 1982.
- Jones, Terry L., ed. Campbell Brown's Civil War: With Ewell and the Army of Northern Virginia. Baton Rouge: Louisiana State University Press, 2001.
- Jordan, Jr., William G., ed. The Civil War Journals of John Mead Gould, 1861–1866. Baltimore, Maryland: Butternut & Blue, 1997.
- Kerr, Homer L., ed. Fighting with Ross' Texas Cavalry Brigade, C.S.A.: The Diary of George C. Griscom, Adjutant, 9th Texas Cavalry Regiment. Hillsboro, Texas: Hill Junior College Press, 1976.
- Key, Hobart and Max Lale, eds. The Civil War Letters of David R. Garrett. Marshall, Texas: Port Caddo, 1963.
- Kohl, Lawrence Frederick and Margaret Cosse Richard, eds. Irish Green and Union Blue: The Civil War Letters of Peter Welsh. New York: Fordham University Press, 1986.
- Kundahl, George G. The Bravest of the Brave: The Correspondence of Stephen Dodson Ramseur. Chapel Hill: University of North Carolina Press, 2010.
- Laas, Virginia Jeans, ed. Wartime Washington: The Civil War Letters of Elizabeth Blair Lee. Urbana: University of Illinois Press, 1991.
- Lassen, Coralou Peel, ed. Dear Sarah: Letters Home from a Soldier of the Iron Brigade. Bloomington, Indiana: Indiana University Press, 1999.
- Lincecum, Jerry Bryan, Edward Hake Philips, and Peggy A. Redshaw, editors. Gideon Lincecum's Sword: The Civil War Letters from the Texas Home Front. Denton: University of North Texas Press, 2001.
- Longacre, Edward G., ed. From Antietam to Fort Fisher: The Civil War Letters of Edward K. Wightman, 1862–1865. Cranbury, New Jersey: Associated University Presses, 1985.
- Longacre, Glenn V. and John E. Hass, eds. To Battle for God and the Right: The Civil War Letterbooks of Emerson Opdyke. Champaign: University of Illinois Press, 2003.
- Longstreet, Helen Dortch (1904). Lee and Longstreet at high tide; Gettysburg in the light of the official records; Gainesville, Ga., The author
- Lowe, David W., ed. Meade's Army: The Private Notebooks of Lt. Col. Theodore Lyman. Kent, Ohio: Kent State University Press, 2007.
- Lowe, Richard, ed. A Texas Cavalry Officer's Civil War: The Diary and Letters of James C. Bates. Baton Rouge: Louisiana State University Press, 1999.
- Lowe, Richard, ed. Greyhound Commander: Confederate General John G. Walker's History of the Civil War West of the Mississippi. Baton Rouge: Louisiana State University Press, 2013.
- Lyman, Theodore. With Grant & Meade From the Wilderness to Appomattox. Introduction by Brooks D. Simpson. Lincoln, NE and London: University of Nebraska Press, 1994. Bison Book Edition. ISBN 978-0803279353.
- MacLean, David, ed. Prisoner of the Rebels in Texas: The Civil War Narrative of Aaron T. Sutton, Corporal, Eighty–Third Ohio Volunteer Infantry. Dectur, Indiana: Americana, 1974.
- Mannis, Jedediah, and Galen R. Wilson, eds. Bound to be a Soldier: The Letters of Private James T. Miller, 111th Pennsylvania Infantry, 1861–1864. Knoxville: University of Tennessee Press, 2001.
- Marten, James. Civil War America: Voices from the Home Front. ABC-CLIO, 2003.
- McGehee, James E., ed. Service with the Missouri State Guard: The Memoir of Brigadier General James Harding. Springfield, Missouri: Oak Hills, 2000.
- McGuire, Judith Brockenbrough. Diary of a Southern Refugee During the War: Annoted Edition, edited by James I Roberston, Jr. University Press of Kentucky, 2014. ISBN 978-0813144382.
- McKee, James Cooper. Narrative of the Surrender of a Command of the U.S. Forces at Fort Fillmore, New Mexico in July A.D. 1861. Houston, Texas: Stagecoach, 1961.
- McMullen, Glenn L., ed. A Surgeon with Stonewall Jackson: The Civil War Letters of Dr. Harvey Black. Baltimore, Maryland: Butternut and Blue, 1995.
- McKnight, William. Do They Miss Me at Home?: The Civil War Letters of William McKnight, Seventh Ohio Volunteer Cavalry. Athens: Ohio University Press, 2010.
- Menge, W. Springer and J. August Shimrak, eds. The Civil War Notebook of Daniel Chisholm: A Chronicle of Daily Life in the Union Army, 1864–1865. New York: Orion Books, 1989.
- Miers, Earl Schenck, ed. Wash Roebling's War: Being a Selection from the Unpublished Civil War Letters of Washington Augustus Roebling. Newark, Delaware: Curtis Paper Company, 1961.
- Mitchell, Charles W. "Maryland Voices of the Civil War." 2007.
- Montgomery, Jr., George F. Georgia Sharpshooter: The Civil War Diary and Letters of William Rhadamanthus Montgomery, 1839–1906. Mercer, Georgia: Mercer University Press, 1997l
- Mulligan, Jr., William H., ed. A Badger Boy in Blue: The Civil War Letters of Chauncey H. Cooke. Detroit, Michigan: Wayne State University Press, 2007.
- Mushkat, Jerome, ed. A Citizen–Soldier's Civil War: The Letters of Brevet Major General Alvin C. Voris. De Kalb: Northern Illinois University Press, 2002.
- Nevins, Allan, ed. A Diary of Battle: The Personal Journals of Colonel Charles S. Wainwright, 1861–1865. New York: Harcourt, Brace & World, 1962.
- Northen III, Charles Swift, editor. All Right Let Them Come: The Civil War Diary of an East Tennessee Confederate. Knoxville: University of Tennessee Press, 2003.
- O'Beirne, Keven E., ed. My Life in the Irish Brigade: The Civil War Memoirs of Private William McCarter, 116th Pennsylvania Infantry. Campbell, California: Savas, 1996.
- Oeffinger, John C., ed. A Soldier's General: The Civil War Letters of Major General Lafayette McLaws. Chapel Hill: University of North Carolina Press, 2002.
- Osborne, Seward R., ed. The Civil War Diaries of Col. Theodore B. Gates, 20th New York State Militia. Hightstown, New Jersey: Longstreet House, 1991.
- Patch, Eileen Mae Knapp, ed. This from George: The Civil War Letters of Sergeant George Magusta Englis, 1861–1865, Company K, 89th New York Regiment of Volunteer Infantry Known as the Dickinson Guard. Binghamton, New York: Broome County Historical Society, 2001.
- Patrick, Jeffrey L. and Robert J. Willey, eds. Fighting for Liberty and Right: The Civil War Diary of William Bluffton Miller, Company K, Seventy–fifth Indiana Volunteer Infantry. Knoxville: University of Tennessee Press, 2005.
- Patrick, Marsena R. Inside Lincoln's Army: The Diary of Marsena Rudolf Patrick, Provost Marshall General, Army of the Potomac, edited by Davis S. Sparks. New York: Yoseloff, 1964.
- Paxton, Frank. The Civil War Letters of General Frank "Bull" Paxton, CSA, edited by John Gallatin Paxton. Hillsboro, Texas: Hill Junior College Press, 1978.
- Phillips, Brenda D., ed. Personal Reminiscences of a Confederate Soldier Boy: Robert M. Magill, Co. F, 39th Ga. Reg. Inf. Milledgeville, Georgia: Boyd Publishing, 1993.
- Pitcock, Cynthia D. and Bill J. Gurley, eds. "I Acted from Principle": The Civil War Diary of Dr. William M. McPheeters, Confederate Surgeon in the Trans-Mississippi. Fayetteville: University of Arkansas Press, 2002.
- Poriss, Gerry H and Ralph G Poriss, eds. While My Country Is in Danger: The Life and Letters of Lieutenant Colonel Richard S. Thompson, Twelfth New Jersey Volunteers. Hamilton, New York: Edmonston Publishing, 1994.
- Porter, Charles W., ed. In the Devil's Dominions: A Union Soldier's Adventures in Bushwhacker Country. Nevada, Missouri: Bushwhacker Museum, 1998.
- Quaife, Milo M., ed. From the Cannon's Mouth: The Civil War Letters of General Alpheus S. Williams. Detroit, Michigan: Wayne State University Press, 1959.
- Raab, Steven S., ed. With the 3rd Wisconsin Badgers: The Living Experience of the Civil War Through the Journals of Van R. Willard. Mechanicsburg, Pennsylvania: Stackpole, 1999.
- Racine, Philip N. "Unspoiled Heart": The Journal of Charles Mattocks of the 17th Maine. Knoxville: University of Tennessee Press, 1994.
- Radigan, Emily N., ed. "Desolating This Fair Country": The Civil War Diary and Letters of Lt. Henry C. Lyon, 34th New York. Jefferson, North Carolina: McFarland, 1999.
- Reid–Green, Marcia, ed. Letters Home: Henry Matrau of the Iron Brigade. Lincoln: University of Nebraska Press, 1993.
- Reiger, Paul E., ed. Through One Man's Eyes: Civil War Letters of James G. Theaker. Mount Vernon, Ohio,: Printing Arts Press, Inc., 1974
- Reinhart, Joseph R. A German Hurrah!: Civil War Letters of Fredrich Bertsch and Wilhelm Stangel, 9th Ohio Infantry. Kent, Ohio: Kent State University Press, 2011.
- Reyburn, Philip J. and Terry L. Wilson, eds. "Jottings from Dixie": The Civil War Dispatches of Sergeant Major Stephen F. Fleharty, U.S.A. Baton Rouge: Louisiana State University Press, 1999.
- Risley, Ford, ed. The Civil War: Primary Documents on Events from 1860 to 1865. Greenwood, 2004.
- Richie, Norman L., ed. Four Years in the First New York Light Artillery: The Papers of David F. Ritchie. Hamilton, New York: Edmonston, 1997.
- Robertson, Jr., James I., ed. The Civil War Letters of General Robert McAllister. New Jersey Civil War Centennial, 1965.
- Robertson, Jr., James I., ed. Soldier of Southwestern Virginia: The Civil War Letters of Captain John Preston Sheffey. Louisiana State University Press, 2004.
- Roper, John Herbert, ed. Repairing the March of Mars: The Civil War Diaries of John Samuel Apperson, Hospital Steward in the Stonewall Brigade, 1861–1865. Macon, Georgia: Mercer University Press, 2001.
- Rosenblatt, Emil and Ruth Rosenblatt, eds. Hard Marching Every Day: The Civil War Letters of Private Wilbur Fisk, 1861–1865. Lawrence: University Press of Kansas, 1991.
- Samito, Christian G. Fear Was not in Him: The Civil War Letters of Major General Francis Barlow, U.S.A. New York: Fordham University Press, 2004.
- Sand, Peter H. and John F. McLaughlin, eds. Crossing Antietam: The Civil War Letters of Captain Henry Augustus Sand, Company A, 103rd New York Volunteers. Jefferson, North Carolina: McFarland, 2016. ISBN 978-1476663104.
- Sauers, Richard A., ed. The Civil War Journal of Colonel William J. Bolton, 51st Pennsylvania, April 20, 1861 – August 2, 1865. Conshohocken, Pennsylvania: Combined Publishing, 2000.
- Schafer, Joseph, ed. Intimate letters of Carl Schurz, 1841–1869. Madison: State Historical Society of Wisconsin, 1928.
- Schiller, Herbert M., ed. A Captain's War: The Letters and Diaries of William H.S. Burgwyn, 1861–1865. Shippensburg, Pennsylvania: White Mane Publishing Co., 1994.
- Schmidt, Martin F., ed. General George Crook: His Autobiography. Norman: University of Oklahoma Press, 1946.
- Schulz, Charles R., ed. "Hurrah for the Texans": Civil War Letters of George W. Ingram. College Station: Friends of the Texas A&M University Library, 1974.
- Scott, Robert G., ed. Fallen Leaves: The Civil War Letters of Major Henry Livermore Abbott. Kent, Ohio: Kent State University Press, 1991.
- Scott, Robert Garth. Forgotten Valor: The Memoirs, Journals, & Civil War Letters of Orlando B. Wilcox. Kent, Ohio: Kent State University Press, 1999.
- Seagrave, Pia Seija, ed. A Boy Lieutenant: Memoirs of Freeman S. Bowley, 30th United States Colored Troops Officer. Fredericksburg, Virginia: Sergeant Kirkland's Museum and Historical Society, 1997.
- Sears, Stephen W., ed. Mr Dunn Browne's Experiences in the War: The Civil War Letters of Samuel W. Fiske. New York: Fordham University PRess, 1998.
- Sears, Stephen W., ed. On Campaign with the Army of the Potomac: The Civil War Journal of Theodore Ayrault Dodge. New York: Cooper Square Press, 2001.
- Sears, Stephen W., ed. The Civil War: The Second Year Told by Those Who Lived It. New York: The Library of America, 2012. ISBN 978-1598531442.
- Sheehan-Dean, Aaron, ed. The Civil War: The Final Year Told by Those Who Lived It. New York: The Library of America, 2014. ISBN 978-1598532944.
- Silliker, Ruth L. The Rebel Yell and the Yankee Hurrah: The Civil War Journal of a Maine Volunteer. Camden, Maine: Down East Books, 1985.
- Simmons, Marc, ed. The Battle at Valley's Ranch: First Account of the Gettysburg of the West. Santa Fe, New Mexico: San Pedro, 1987.
- Simpson, Brooks D., Stephen W. Sears and Aaron Sheehan-Dean, eds. The Civil War: The First Year Told by Those Who Lived It. New York: The Library of America, 2011. ISBN 978-1598530889.
- Simpson, Brooks D., ed. The Civil War: The Third Year Told by Those Who Lived It. New York: The Library of America, 2013. ISBN 978-1598531978.
- Sizer, Lyde Cullen and Cullen, Jim, ed. The Civil War Era: An Anthology of Sources. Blackwell, 2005.
- Smith, Barbara A., compiler. The Civil War Letters of Col. Elijah H.C. Cavins, 14th Indiana. Owensboro, Kentucky: Cook-McDowell Publications, 1981.
- Spurlin, Charles D., ed. The Civil War Diary of Charles A Leuschner. Austin, Texas: Aekin, 1992.
- Still, Jr., William N. "What Finer Tradition": The Memoirs of Thomas O. Selfridge, Jr., Rear Admiral, U.S.N. Columbia: University of South Carolina Press, 1987.
- Styple, William B., ed. Letters from the Peninsula: The Civil War Letters of General Philip Kearny. Kearny, New Jersey: Belle Grove, 1988.
- Styple, William B., ed. Our Noble Blood: The Civil War Letters of Regis de Trobriand, Major–General U.S.V. Kearny, New Jersey: Belle Grove Publishing, 1997.
- Styple, William B., ed. With a Flash of His Sword: The Writings of Major Holman S. Melcher 20th Maine Infantry. Kearny, New Jersey: Bell Grove, 1994.
- Styple, William B., ed. Writing and Fighting in the Civil War: Soldier Correspondence to the New York Sunday Mercury. Kearny, New Jersey: Belle Grove, 1994.
- Sumner, Merlin E., ed. The Diary of Cyrus B. Comstock. Dayton, Ohio: Morningside House, 1987.
- Summersell, Charles G. The Journal of George Townley Fullam: Boarding Officer of the Confederate Sea Raider Alabama: University of Alabama Press, 1973.
- Tapert, Annette, ed. The Brothers' War: Civil War Letters to Their Loved Ones from the Blue and Gray. New York: Vintage Books, 1989.
- Tappan, George, ed. The Civil War Journal of Lt. Russell M. Tuttle, New York Volunteer Infantry. Jefferson, North Carolina: McFarland, 2006.
- Tate, Thomas K., ed. The Civil War Letters of a Confederate Artillery Officer (Col. Frank Huger, C.S.A.). Jefferson, North Carolina: McFarland & Co., 2011.
- Thomas, Mary Warner, and Richard A. Sauers, editors. The Civil War Letters of First Lieutenant James B. Thomas Adjutant, 107th Pennsylvania Volunteers. Baltimore, Maryland: Butternut & Blue, 1995.
- Thompson, Jerry, ed. Civil War in the Southwest: Recollections of the Sibley Brigade. College Station: Texas A&M University Press, 2001.
- Thompson, Jerry, ed. From Desert to Bayou: The Civil War Journal and Sketches of Morgan Wolf Merrick. El Paso: Texas Western Press, 1991.
- Thompson, Jerry, ed. Westward the Texans: The Civil War Journal of Private William Randolph Howell. El Paso: Texas Western Press, 1990.
- Thompson, Jerry, Robert Wooster, and Ben E. Pingenot, editors. The Reminiscences of Major General Zenas R. Bliss. Austin: Texas State Historical Association, 2007.
- Thompson, Robert M. and Richard Wainwright, eds. The Confidential Correspondence of Gustavus V. Fox, two volumes. New York, 1919.
- Tilley, Nannie M., ed. Federals on the Frontier: The Diary of Benjamin F. McIntyre, 1862–1864. Austin: University of Texas Press, 1963.
- Tower, R. Lockwood, ed. A Carolinian Goes to War: The Civil War Narrative of Arthur Middleton Manigault, Brigadier General, C.S.A. Columbia: University of South Carolina Press, 1983.
- Turino, Kenneth C., ed. The Civil War Diary of Lieut. J.E. Hodgkins, 19th Massachusetts Volunteers, from August 11, 1862 to June 3, 1865. Camden, Maine, Picton Press, 1994.
- Turner, Charles W., ed. My Dear Emma: (War Letters of Col. James K. Edmondson, 1861–1865). Verona, Virginia: McClure Printing Company, 1978.
- Turner, Charles W., ed. Ted Barclay, Liberty Hall Volunteers: Letters from the Stonewall Brigade (1861–1864). Natural Bridge Station, Virginia: Rockbridge Publishing Company, 1992.
- Turner, Nat, ed. A Southern Soldier's Letters Home: The Civil War Letters of Samuel Burney, Army of Northern Virginia. Macon, Georgia: Mercer University Press, 2003.
- Underhill, Charles Sterling. 'Your Soldier Boy Samuel': Civil War Letters of Lt. Samuel Edmund Nichols, Amherst, '65 of the 37th Regiment of Massachusetts Volunteers. published by the author, 1929.
- Vanderslice, Catherine, ed. The Civil War Letters of George Washington Beidelman. New York: Vantage Press, 1978.
- Viola, Herman J., ed. The memoirs of Charles Henry Veil: A Soldier's Recollections of the Civil War and the Arizona Territory. New York: Orion, 1993.
- Walker, Charles N. and Rosemary Walker, eds. Diary of the War by Robt. S. Robertson. Fort Wayne, Indiana: Allen County–Fort Wayne Historical Society, 1965.
- Walton, William, ed. A Civil War Courtship: The Letters of Edwin Weller from Antietam to Atlanta. Garden City, New York: Doubleday, 1980.
- Ward, Eric, ed. The Civil War Letters of George G. Benedict. Mechanicsburg, Pennsylvania: Stackpole Books, 2002.
- Watson, Ronald G., ed. "Death Does Seem to Have All He Can Attend to": The Civil War Diary of an Andersonville Survivor. Jefferson, North Carolina: McFarland Publishing, 2014. ISBN 978-0786478903.
- Weld, Stephen M., ed. War Diary and Letters of Stephen Minot Weld, 1861–1865. Boston: Massachusetts Historical Society, 1979.
- White, Russell C., ed. The Civil War Diary of Wyman S. White, First Sergeant of Company F, 2nd United States Sharpshooter Regiment, 1861–1865. Baltimore, Maryland: Butternut & Blue, 1997.
- White, William Lee and Charles Denny Runion, eds. Great Things Are Expected of Us: The Letters of Colonel C. Irvine Walker, 10th South Carolina Infantry, C.S.A. Knoxville: University of Tennessee Press, 2009.
- Whitehouse, Hugh L., ed. Letters from the Iron Brigade: George Washington Patridge, Jr., 1839–1863, Civil War Letters to His Sister. Indianapolis, Indiana: Guild Press of Indiana, 1994.
- Wiggins, Sarah Woolfolk. The Journals of Josiah Gorgas, 1857–1878. Tuscaloosa: University of Alabama Press, 1995.
- Wiley, Bell Irvin, ed. "This Infernal War": The Confederate Letters of Sergeant Edwin H. Fay. Austin: University of Texas Press, 1958.
- Wiley, Kenneth, ed. Norfolk Blues: The Civil War Diary of the Norfolk Light Artillery Blues. Shippensburg, Pennsylvania: Burd Street Press, 1997.
- Williams, Edward B., ed. Rebel Brothers: The Civil War Letters of the Truehearts. College Station: Texas A&M University Press, 1995.
- Williams, Richard B., ed. Stonewall's Prussian Mapmaker: The Journals of Captain Oscar Hincichs. Chapel Hill: University of North Carolina Press, 2014. ISBN 978-1469614342.
- Wilson, John P. and Jerry Thompson, eds. The Civil War in West Texas and New Mexico: The Lost Letterbook of Brigadier General Henry Hopkins Sibley. College Station: Texas A&M University Press, 2001.
- Winther, Oscar Osburn, ed. With Sherman to the Sea: The Civil War Letters, Diaries & Reminiscences of Theodore F. Upson. Bloomington: Indiana University Press, 1958.
- Wittenberg, Eric J., ed. One of Custer's Wolverines: The Civil War Letters of Brevet Brigadier General James H. Kidd, 6th Michigan Cavalry. Kent, Ohio: Kent State University Press, 2000.
- Wittenberg, Eric J., ed. Under Custer's Command: The Civil War Journal of James Henry Avery. Washington, D.C.: Brassey's, 2000.
- Wynne, Lewis N. and Robert A. Taylor, eds. This War So Horrible: The Civil War Diary of Hiram Smith Williams. Tuscaloosa: University of Alabama Press, 1993.
- Yearns, W. Buck and Barret, John G., eds. North Carolina Civil War Documentary, 1980.
- Confederate official government documents major online collection of complete texts in HTML format, from U. of North Carolina
- The Civil War Letters of Forrest Little a digitized collection of actual letters from an ordinary Union soldier chronicling his everyday life and the drama of battle, from Saint Mary's College of California
- Photographs of the Civil War – a Library of Congress exhibition This exhibition from the Library of Congress features Civil War-era ambrotype and tintype photographs of Union and Confederate soldiers. The collection's detailed portraits document the soldier uniforms, weapons, musical instruments and other possessions and include significant representation of African American troops and the families of soldiers.

=== Memoirs ===
- Anderson, Ephraim McD. Memoirs, Historical and Personal, Including the Campaigns of the First Missouri Confederate Brigade, ed. by Edwin C. Bearss. Dayton, Ohio: Morningside, 1972.
- Armes, Augustus. Ups and Downs of an Army Officer. Washington, D.C.: no publisher listed, 1900.
- Aschmann, Rudolf. Memoirs of a Swiss Officer in the American Civil War, Heinz K. Meier, ed. Bern, Switzerland: Herbert Lang, 1972.
- Baird, W. David, ed. A Creek Warrior for the Confederacy: The Autobiography of Chief G.W. Greyson. Norman: University of Oklahoma Press, 1988.
- Ballard, Alfred. Gone for a Soldier: The Civil War Memoirs of Private Alfred Ballard, edited by David Herbert Donald. Boston: Little, Brown, 1975.
- Bancroft, Frederic and William A. Dunning, eds. The Reminiscences of Carl Schurz, five volumes. New York: The McClure Company, 1908.
- Barney, Chester. Recollections of Field Service with the Twentieth Iowa Infantry Volunteers; or, What I Saw in the Army; Embracing Accounts of Marches, Battles, Sieges, and Skirmished in Missouri, Arkansas, Mississippi, Louisiana, Alabama, Florida, Texas, and along the Northern Border of Mexico. Davenport, Iowa: Davenport Gazette, 1865.
- Bassett, Edward. From Bull Run to Bristow Station, edited by M.H. Bassett. St. Paul, Minnesota: North Central Publishing, 1962.
- Bates, David Homer. Lincoln in the Telegraph Office: Recollections of the United States Military Telegraph Corps during the Civil War. New York: Century Co., 1907.
- Beale, G.W. A Lieutenant of Cavalry in Lee's Army. Boston: Gorham Press, 1918.
- Benson, Susan Williams, ed. Berry Benson's Civil War Book: Memoirs of a Confederate Scout and Sharpshooter. Athens: University of Georgia Press, 1992.
- Benton, Charles E. As Seen from the Ranks: A Boy in the Civil War. New York: G.P. Putnam's Sons, 1902.
- Billings, John D. Hardtack and Coffee, or the Unwritten Story of Army Life. Boston, Massachusetts: G. M. Smith, 1887.
- Bloodgood, John D. Personal Reminiscences of the War. New York: Hunt and Eaton, 1893.
- Booth, George W. Personal Reminiscences of a Maryland Soldier in the War Between the States. Baltimore, Maryland: Fleet, McGinley and Co., 1898.
- Borton, Benjamin. Awhile with the Blue; Or, Memories of War Days, the True Story of a Private. Passaic, New Jersey: William Taylor, 1898.
- Bowen, Ronald. From Ball's Bluff to Gettysburg . . . And Beyond, edited by Gregory A. Coco. Gettysburg, Pennsylvania: Thomas Publications, 1994.
- Brainerd, Wesley. Bridge Building in Wartime: Colonel Wesley Brainerd's Memoir of the 50th New York Volunteer Engineers, edited by Ed Malles. Knoxville: University of Tennessee Press, 1997.
- Brown, Augustus C. The Diary of a Line Officer. New York: no publisher listed, 1906.
- Brown, Kent Masterson, ed. One of Morgan's Men: Memoirs of Lieutenant John M. Porter of the Ninth Kentucky Cavalry. Lexington: University Press of Kentucky, 2011. ISBN 978-0813129891.
- Buell, Augustus. "The Cannoneer": Recollections of Service in the Army of the Potomac. Washington, D.C.: National Tribune, 1890.
- Casler, John O. Four Years in the Stonewall Brigade. Girard, Kansas: Appeal Publishing Co., 1906.
- Clark, Willene B., ed. Valleys of the Shadow: The Memoir of Confederate Captain Reuben G. Clark, Company I, 59th Tennessee Mounted Infantry. Knoxville: University of Tennessee Press, 1994.
- Cochrane, John. The War for the Union: Memoir of Gen. John Cochrane. New York: no publisher listed, 1875.
- Cockrell, Monroe F., ed. Gunner with Stonewall: Reminiscences of William Thomas Poague. Jackson, Tennessee: McCowat–Mercer, 1957.
- Cole, Jacob H. Under Five Commanders: Or, a Boy's Experiences with the Army of the Potomac. Paterson, New Jersey: New Print, 1906.
- Cox, Jacob D. Military Reminiscences of the Civil War, two volumes. New York: Charles Scribner's Sons, 1910.
- Cozzens, Peter, and Robert I. Girardi, eds. The Military Memoirs of General John Pope. Chapel Hill: University of North Carolina Press, 1998.
- Crotty, D.B. Four Years Campaigning in the Army of the Potomac. Grand Rapids, Michigan: Dygert Brothers, 1874.
- Dana, Charles A. A Recollection of the Civil War with the Leaders at Washington and in the Field in the Sixties. New York: D. Appleton, 1899.
- Davis, Varina H. Jefferson Davis, Ex–President of the Confederate States of America: A Memoir by His Wife, two volumes. New York, 1890.
- Dawes, Rufus R. Service with the Sixth Wisconsin Volunteers. Marietta, Ohio: E. R. Alderman & Sons, 1890.
- Douglas, Henry Kyd. I Rode with Stonewall. Chapel Hill: University of North Carolina Press, 1940.
- Du Forest, John W. A Volunteer's Adventures: A Union Captain's Record of the Civil War, James W. Croushore, ed. New Haven, Connecticut: Yale University Press, 1946.
- Durkin, Joseph T., ed. Confederate Chaplain: A War Journal of Rev. James B. Sheeran, C.Ss.R., Fourteenth Louisiana, C.S.A. Milwaukee, Wisconsin: Bruce Publishing Company, 1960.
- Early, Jubal A. Autobiographical Sketch and Narrative of the War between the States. Philadelphia: J. B. Lippincott, 1912.
- Early, Jubal A. A Memoir of the Last Year of the War for Independence, in the Confederate States of America, Containing an Account of His Commands in the Years 1864 and 1865. Lynchburg, Virginia: C. W. Button, 1867.
- Eckert, Edward K. and Nicholas J. Amato. Ten Years in the Saddle: The Memoir of William Woods Averell, 1851–1862. San Rafael, California: Presidio Press, 1978.
- Favill, Josiah M. The Diary of a Young Officer Serving with the Armies of the United States during the War of the Rebellion. Chicago: R.R. Donnelley and Sons, 1909.
- French, S.G. Two Wars: An Autobiography. Nashville, Tennessee: Confederate Veteran, 1901.
- Fuller, Charles. Personal Recollections of the War of 1861. Sherburne, New York: News Job Printing House, 1906.
- Galwey, Thomas F. The Valiant Hours: Narrative of "Captain Brevet," An Irish-American in the Army of the Potomac, edited by W.S. Nye. Harrisburg, Pennsylvania: Stackpole, 1961.
- Gerrish, Henry. Letter to Lyman: The Personal Letter of a Civil War Soldier to His Grandson, Walter Lyman Medding, Recounting His Wartime Experiences, edited by Walter S. Medding. Springfield, Virginia: Genealogical Books in Print, 1978.
- Gibbon, John. Personal Recollections of the Civil War. New York: G. P. Putnam's Sons, 1928.
- Gill, John. Reminiscences of Four Years as a Private Soldier in the Confederate Army. Baltimore, Maryland: Sun Printing Office, 1904.
- Gordon, John B. Reminiscences of the Civil War. New York: Charles Scribner's Sons, 1903.
- Grant, Ulysses S. Personal Memoirs, two volumes. New York: Charles L. Webster, 1885.
- Grant, Ulysses S. Memoirs and Selected Letters, edited by Mary Drake McFeely and William S. McFeely. The Library of America, 1990. ISBN 0940450585.
- Graybill, John H. Diary of a Confederate Soldier, edited by Ruth Woods Dayton. Philippi, West Virginia: privately published, 1961.
- Hagood, Johnson C. Memoirs of the War of Secession. Columbia: State Company, 1910.
- Haley, John. The Rebel Yell and the Yankee Hurrah: The Civil War Journal of a Maine Volunteer, edited by Ruth L. Silliker. Camden, Maine: Down East Books, 1985.
- Haynes, Dennis E. "A Thrilling Narrative": The Memoir of a Southern Unionist. Washington, D.C.: McGill and Witherow, 1866.
- Hazen, William Babcock. A Narrative of Military Service. Boston: Ticknor and Company, 1885.
- Heth, Henry. The Memoirs of Henry Heth. Westport, Connecticut: Greenwood Press, 1974.
- Hitchcock, Frederick L. War from the Inside; Or, Personal Experiences, Impressions, and Reminiscences of One of the "Boys" in the War of the Rebellion. Philadelphia: J.B. Lippincott, 1904.
- Hood, John B. Advance and Retreat: Personal Experiences in the United States and Confederate States Armies. New Orleans: Hood Orphan Memorial Fund, 1880.
- Hotchkiss, Jedediah. Make Me a Map of the Valley: The Civil War Journal of Stonewall Jackson's Topographer, edited by Archie P. McDonald. Dallas, Texas: Southern Methodist University Press, 1973.
- Howard, McHenry. Recollections of a Maryland Staff Officer Under Johnston, Jackson and Lee. Baltimore, Maryland: Williams and Wilkins, 1914.
- Howard, Oliver Otis. Autobiography of Oliver Otis Howard, Major General United States Army, two volumes. New York: The Baker & Taylor Co., 1914.
- Hyde, Thomas W. Following the Greek Cross, or Memoirs of the Sixth Army Corps. Boston: Houghton Mifflin, 1895.
- Jackson, Mary Anna. Memoirs of Stonewall Jackson. Louisville, Kentucky: The Prentice Press, 1895.
- Johnston, Joseph E. Narrative of Military Operations. New York: D. Appleton and Co., 1874.
- Jones, J. B. A Rebel War Clerk's Diary at the Confederate States Capital, two volumes. Philadelphia: J. B. Lippencott, 1866.
- Jones, Terry L., ed. The Civil War Memoirs of Captain William J. Seymour: Reminiscences of a Louisiana Tiger. Baton Rouge: Louisiana State University Press, 1991.
- Kellersberger, Getulius. Memoirs of an Engineer in the Confederate Army in Texas, translated by Helen S. Sundstrom. Austin, Texas: privately published, 1957.
- Koonce, Donald B., ed. Doctor to the Front: The Recollections of Confederate Surgeon Thomas Fanning Wood, 1861–1865. Knoxville: University of Tennessee Press, 2000.
- Lockwood, James D. Life and Adventures of a Drummer-Boy; Or, Seven Years a Soldier. Albany, New York: J. Skinner, 1893.
- Long, A. L. Memoirs of General Robert E. Lee: His Military and Personal History Embracing a Large Amount of Information Hitherto Unpublished.. New York: J. M. Stoddart, 1886.
- Longstreet, James B. From Manassas to Appomattox. Philadelphia: J. B. Lippincott, 1896.
- Lyman, Theodore. Meade's Headquarters, 1863–1865, edited by George G. Agassiz. Boston: Atlantic Monthly Press, 1922.
- Marshall, Charles. An Aide–de–camp of Lee, edited by Sir Frederick Maurice. Boston, Massachusetts: Little, Brown, 1927.
- Martin, John C. Lest We Forget Published by the Democrat Publishing Company of Madison, Wisconsin, under the sponsorship of the Wisconsin State Legislature, 1927.
- Maury, Dabney H. Recollections of a Virginian. New York: 1894.
- McCarter, William. My Life in the Irish Brigade: The Civil War Memoirs of Private William McCarter, 116th Pennsylvania Infantry. Edited by Kevin O'Brien. Campbell, California: Savas, 1996.
- McClellan, George B. McClellan's Own Story. New York: Charles L. Webster, 1887.
- McKim, Randolph Harrison. A Soldier's Recollections: Leaves from the Diary of a Young Confederate with an Oration on the Motives and Arms of the Soldiers of the South. New York: Longman's 1911.
- Miller, Edward Gee. Captain Edward Gee Miller of the 20th Wisconsin: His War, 1862–1865, ed. by W. J. Lemke. Fayetteville, Arkansas: Washington County Historical Society, 1960.
- Neese, George M. Four Years in the Confederate Horse Artillery. New York: Neale Publishing Company, 1911.
- Noe, Kenneth W., ed. A Southern Boy in Blue: The Memoir of Marcus Woodcock, 9th Kentucky Infantry (USA). Knoxville: University of Tennessee Press, 1997.
- Opie, John N. A Rebel Cavalryman with Lee, Stuart and Jackson. Chicago: W. B. Conkey Co., 1899.
- Paine, Halbert Eleazer. A Wisconsin Yankee in Confederate Bayou Country: The Civil War Reminiscences of a Union General, edited by Samuel C. Hyde, Jr. Baton Rouge: Louisiana State University Press, 2009.
- Palmer, Edwin. The Second Brigade or, Camp Life. Montpelier, Vermont: E. P. Walton Co., 1864.
- Peck, R. H. Reminiscences of a Confederate Soldier. Fincastle, Virginia: published by author, 1913.
- Poague, William T. Gunner with Stonewall. Jackson, Tennessee: McCowart–Mercer Press, 1957.
- Porter, Horace. Campaigning with Grant. New York: Century Company, 1906.
- Rhodes, Elisha Hunt. All For the Union, edited by Robert H. Rhodes. Lincoln, Rhode Island: Andrew Mowbray, 1985.
- Schmitt, Martin F., ed. General George Crook: His Autobiography. Norman: University of Oklahoma Press, 1960.
- Schofield, John M. Forty–six Years in the Army. New York: Century, 1897.
- Selfridge, Jr., Thomas O. Memoirs of Thomas O. Selfridge, Jr., Rear–Admiral, USN. New York: G.P. Putnam's Sons, 1924.
- Semmes, Raphael. Memoirs of Service Afloat, During the War Between the States. Baltimore, Maryland: Kelly, Piet and Company, 1869.
- Sheehan-Dean, Aaron, ed. The Civil War: The Final Year Told by Those Who Lived It. New York: The Library of America, 2014. ISBN 978-1598532944.
- Sherman, William Tecumseh, Memoirs of General William T. Sherman. 2 vols. 1875.
- Simon, John Y., ed., The Papers of Ulysses S. Grant. Southern Illinois University Press, 1967–present. As of 2006, volumes 1 to 28 covering through September 1878 have been published.
- Small Harold A., ed. The Road to Richmond: The Civil War Memoirs of Major Abner R. Small of the Sixteenth Main Volunteers. New York: Fordham University Press, 2000.
- Smith, William F. Autobiography of Major General William F. Smith, 1861–1864, edited by Herbert M. Schiller. Dayton, Ohio: Morningside, 1990.
- Smith, William F. From Chattanooga to Petersburg under General Grant and Butler: A Contribution to the History of the War, and a Personal Vindication. Boston: Houghton Mifflin, 1893.
- Sorrel, G. Moxley (1905). Recollections of a Confederate Staff Officer. Introduction by Senator John W. Daniel. New York: The Neale Publishing Company. LCCN 05026135. OCLC 1051739509. OL 6958849M – via Internet Archive.
- Spear, Abbott et al., eds. The Civil War Recollections of General Ellis Spear. Orono: University of Maine Press, 1997.
- Stanley, David S. Personal Memoirs of Major General D. S. Stanley, U.S.A. Cambridge, Massachusetts: Harvard University Press, 1917.
- Taylor, Richard: Destruction and Reconstruction: Personal Experiences of the Late War. New York: D. Appleton and Co., 1879.
- Tilney, Robert. My Life in the Army: Three Years and a Half with the Fifth Army Corps, Army of the Potomac, 1862–1865. Philadelphia: Ferris and Leach, 1912.
- Tyler, Mason Whiting. Recollections of the Civil War, With Many Original Diary Entries and Letters Written From the Seat of War, and With Annotated References. New York: G.P. Putnam's Sons, 1912.
- Von Borcke, Heros. Memoirs of the Confederate War for Independence. New York: Peter Smith, 1938.
- Wallace, Lew. Lew Wallace: An Autobiography, two volumes. New York: Harper & Brothers, 1906.
- Watkins, Samuel R. Company Aytch, or a Sideshow of the Big Show. Nashville, Tennessee: Cumberland Presbyterian Publishing House, 1882.
- Wilkenson, Frank. Recollections of a Private Soldier in the Army of the Potomac. New York: G.P. Putnam's Sons, 1893.
- Williams, R.L. With the Border Ruffians: Memories of the Far West, 1852–1868. New York: E.P. Dutton, 1907.
- Wills, Charles W. Army Life of an Illinois Soldier. Washington, D.C.: Globe Printing Company, 1906.
- Wilson, James. Under the Old Flag, two volumes. New York: 1912.
- Wilson, LeGrand J. The Confederate Soldier. Memphis, Tennessee: Memphis State University Press, 1973.
- Woodward, C. Vann, ed. Mary Chesnut's Civil War. Yale University Press, 1981. ISBN 0300029799.
- Worsham, John H. One of Jackson's Foot Cavalry. New York: Neale Publishing Co., 1912.
- Wright, Charles A. A Corporal's Story: Experiences in the Ranks of Company C, 81st Ohio Vol. Infantry, during the War for the Maintenance of the Union, 1861–1864. Philadelphia: James Beale, 1887.
- Wright, James A. No More Gallant a Deed: A Civil War Memoir of the First Minnesota Volunteers, ed. by Steven J. Keillor. St. Paul: Minnesota Historical Society Press, 2001.

== Other ==
- Alford, Kenneth D. Civil War Museum Treasures: Outstanding Artifacts and the Stories Behind Them. Jefferson, North Carolina: McFarland & Company, Inc., 2008. ISBN 978-0786431861.
- Ammen, William. Personnel of the Civil War, two volumes. New York: Thomas Yoseloff, 1961.
- Armistead, Gene C. Horses and Mules in the Civil War: A Complete History with a Roster of More Than 700 War Horses. Jefferson, North Carolina: McFarland & Company, Inc., 2013. ISBN 978-0786473632.
- Armstrong, Richard L. "God Alone Knows Which Was Right": The Blue and Gray Terrill Family of Virginia in the Civil War. Jefferson, North Carolina: McFarland & Company, Inc., 2010. ISBN 978-0786446223.
- Barnard, George N. Photographic Views of Sherman's Campaign. New York: Dover, 1977.
- Bernstein, Iver. The New York City Draft Riots: Their Significance for American Society and Politics in the Age of the Civil War. New York: Oxford University Press, 1990.
- Blight, David W. Frederick Douglass' Civil War: Keeping Faith in Jubilee. Baton Rouge: Louisiana State University Press, 1989.
- Boyd, Steven R. Patriotic Envelops of the Civil War: The Iconography of Union and Confederate Covers. Baton Rouge: Louisiana State University Press, 2010. ISBN 978-0807136850.
- Bunch, Jack. Roster of the Courts–Martial in the Confederate States Army. Shippensburg, Pennsylvania: White Mane Books, 2001.
- Burkhardt, George S. Confederate Rage, Yankee Wrath: No Quarter in the Civil War. Carbondale,

Southern Illinois University Press, 2007.

- Burns, Stanley B. Shooting Soldiers: Civil War Medial Photography by R. B. Bontecou. published by author, 2011.
- Carter, Alice. E. and Richard Jensen. The Civil War on the Web: A Guide to the Very Best Sites. Wilmington, Delaware: SR Books, 2003.
- Church, William. The Life of John Ericsson. New York: 1890.
- Coco, Gregory. The Civil War Infantryman: In Camp, on the March, and in Battle. Gettysburg, Pennsylvania: Thomas Publications, 1998.
- Connelly, T. Lawrence. Will Success Spoil Jeff Davis?: The Last Book about the Civil War. New York: McGraw-Hill, 1963.
- Criswell, Grover C. Confederate and Southern State Bonds.
- Crofts, Daniel W. Reluctant Confederates: Upper South Unionists in the Secession Crisis. Chapel Hill: University of North Carolina Press, 1989.
- Crown, Jr., Francis J. Confederate Postal History.
- Current, Richard Nelson. Lincoln's Loyalists: Union Soldiers from the Confederacy. New York: Oxford University Press, 1993.
- Davis, William C. A Taste for War: The Culinary History of the Blue and the Gray. Lincoln: University of Nebraska Press, 2011. ISBN 978-0803235229.
- Davis, William C. and Bell I. Wiley, eds. Photographic History of the Civil War, two volumes. New York: Black Dog and Leventhal, 1994.
- Dew, Charles B. Ironmaker to the Confederacy: Joseph R. Anderson and the Tredegar Iron Works. New Haven, Connecticut: 1966.
- Evans, Charles M. War of the Aeronauts: A History of Ballooning in the Civil War. Mechanicsburg, Pennsylvania: Stackpole Books, 2002. ISBN 0811713954.
- Faust, Drew Gilpin. The Creation of Confederate Nationalism: Ideology and Identity in the Civil War South. Baton Rouge: Louisiana State University Press, 1989.
- Faust, Patricia L., ed. The Historical Times Illustrated Encyclopedia of the Civil War. New York: Harper & Row, 1986.
- Feis, William B. Grant's Secret Service: The Intelligence War from Belmont to Appomattox. Lincoln: University of Nebraska Press, 2002.
- Fishel, Edwin C. The Secret War for the Union. New York: Houghton Mifflin Company, 1997.
- Freehling, William W. The Road to Disunion: The Secessionists at Bay. New York: Oxford University Press, 1990.
- Garrison, Webb. Mutiny in the Civil War. Shippensburg, Pennsylvania: White Mane Publishing Co., Inc. ISBN 1572492155.
- Garrison, Webb and Cheryl Garrison. Webb Garrison's Civil War Dictionary: An Illustrated Guide to the Everyday Language of Soldiers and Civilians. Cumberland House Publishing, 2009.
- Gibboney, Douglas Lee. Scandals of the Civil War. Shippensburg, Pennsylvania: Burd Street Press, 2013. ISBN 978-1572493643.
- Griffin, John Chandler. A Pictorial History of the Confederacy. Jefferson, North Carolina: McFarland & Company, Inc., 2009. ISBN 978-0786440559.
- Hall, Kenneth E. Stonewall Jackson and Religious Faith in Military Command. Jefferson, North Carolina: McFarland & Company, Inc., 2005. ISBN 978-0786420858.
- Hardin, David. After the War: The Lives and Images of Major Civil War Figures After the Shooting Stopped. Ivan R. Dee, 2010.
- Harris, Sherry. Civil War Records: A Useful Tool: A Step by Step Guide to the Availability and Acquisition of Civil War Records, two volumes. Yorba Linda, California: Shumway Family History Services, 1990–1993.
- Kelly, C. Brian. Best Little Stories From The Civil War. Charlottesville, Virginia: Montpelier Publishing, 1995.
- Klement, Frank L. Dark Lanterns: Secret Political Societies, Conspiracies, and Treason Trials in the Civil War. Baton Rouge: Louisiana State University Press, 1984.
- Knight, H. Jackson. Confederate Invention: The Story of the Confederate States Patent Office and Its Inventors. Baton Rouge: Louisiana State University Press, 2011. ISBN 978-0807137628.
- Kurtz, Lucy Fitzhugh and Benny Ritter. A Roster of Confederate Soldiers Buried in Stonewall Cemetery, Winchester Virginia. Winchester, Virginia: Farmers and Merchants National Bank, 1984.
- Leigh, Philip. Lee's Lost Dispatch and Other Civil War Controversies. Yardley, PA: Westholme Publishing, 2015. ISBN 978-1594162268.
- Lewis, Felice Flanery. Trailing Clouds of Glory: Zachary Taylor's Mexican War Campaign and His Emerging Civil War Leaders. Tuscaloosa: University of Alabama Press, 2010. ISBN 978-0817316785.
- Lossing, Benson J. Pictorial Field Books of the Civil War: Journeys through the Battlefields in the Wake of Conflict, three volumes. Baltimore, Maryland: Johns Hopkins University Press, 1997.
- McClintock, Russell. Lincoln and the Decision for War: The Northern Response to Secession. Chapel Hill,

University of North Carolina Press, 2008.

- McManus, Stephen, Donald Thompson, and Thomas Churchill. The Civil War Research Guide: A Guide for Researching Your Civil War Ancestor. Mechanicsburg, Pennsylvania: Stackpole Books, 2003. ISBN 0811726436.
- McMurry, Richard M. Virginia Military Institute Alumni in the Civil War. Lynchburg, Virginia: H.E. Howard, 1999.
- Morris, Jr., Roy. The Better Angel: Walt Whitman in the Civil War. New York: Oxford University Press, 2000.
- Murdock, Eugene C. Patriotism Limited, 1862–1865: The Civil War Draft and Bounty System. Kent, Ohio: Kent State University Press, 1967.
- Murdock, Eugene C. One Million Men: The Civil War Draft in the North. Madison: State Historical Society of Wisconsin, 1971.
- National Archives and Records Administration. A Guide to Civil War Maps in the National Archives. Washington, D.C.: National Archives and Records Administration, 1986.
- Nickels, Cameron C. Civil War Humor. Jackson: University Press of Mississippi, 2010. ISBN 978-1604737479.
- Philips, Stanley S. Excavated Artifacts from Battlefields and Camp Sites of the Civil War.
- Pritchard, Shannon. Collecting the Confederacy: Artifacts and Antiques from the War Between the States. Savas Beatie, LLC, 2007. ISBN 978-1932714104.
- Quigley, Robert D. Civil War Spoken Here. Collingswood, New Jersey: CW Historicals, 1994.
- Ray, Delia. A Nation Torn
- Rickard, James H. Services With Colored Troops in Burnside's Corps. Providence: Rhode Island Soldiers and Sailors Historical Society, 1894.
- Ringle, Dennes J. Life in Mr. Lincoln's Navy. Annapolis, Maryland: Naval Institute Press, 1999.
- Schantz, Mark S. Awaiting the Heavenly Country: The Civil War and America's Culture of Death. Cornell University Press, 2008.
- Schmidt, James M. Lincoln's Labels: America's Best Known Brands and the Civil War. Edinborough Press, 2009.
- Simmons, Jr., Donald C. Confederate Settlements in British Honduras. Jefferson, North Carolina: McFarland & Company, Inc., 2001. ISBN 978-0786410163.
- Smith, Andrew F. Starving the South – How the North Won the Civil War. New York: St. Martin's Press, 2011. ISBN 978-0312601812.
- Stokes, Karen. The Immortal 600: Surviving Civil War Charleston and Savannah. Charleston, South Carolina: The History Press, 2013. ISBN 978-1609499891.
- Thienel, Philip M. Mr. Lincoln's Bridge Builders: The Right Hand of American Genius. Shippensburg, Pennsylvania: White Mane, 2000.
- Varhola, Michael J. Everyday Life During the Civil War. Cincinnati, Oh: Writer's Digest Books, 1999.
- Wardlaw, Trevor P. Sires and Sons: The Story of Hubbard's Regiment. CreateSpace Independent Publishing Platform, 2015. ISBN 978-1511963732
- Waugh, John C. The Class of 1846: From West Point to Appomattox: Stonewall Jackson, George McClellan, and Their Brothers. New York: Warner, 1994.
- Wilson, Mindwell Crampton, ed. Indiana Battle Flags. Indianapolis, Indiana: Indiana Battle Flag Commission, 1929.
- Woodworth, Steven E., and Kenneth J. Winkle. Atlas of the Civil War. New York: Oxford University Press, 2004.
- Zucchero, Michael. Loyal Hearts: Histories of Civil War Canines. Schroder Publications, 2009.

== See also ==
- Bibliography of slavery in the United States
- Bibliography of Abraham Lincoln
- Bibliography of Ulysses S. Grant
- List of bibliographies on American history
