= History of the Southern United States =

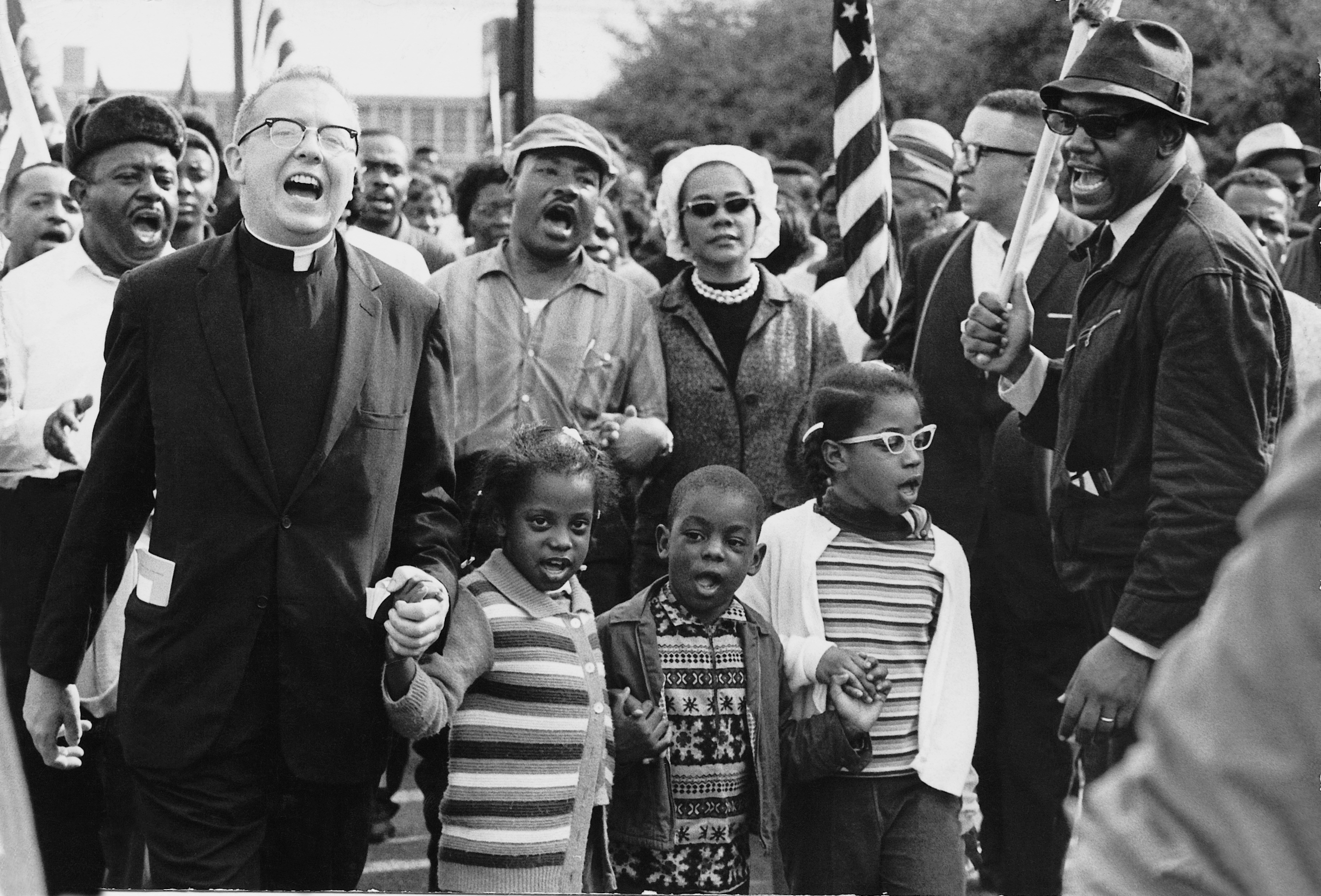
Selma to Montgomery marchers demonstrating for the right to vote in 1965, including Ralph Abernathy, James Reeb, Martin Luther King Jr., Coretta Scott King, and three of Abernathy's children, arrive in Montgomery.

Human occupation of the Southern United States began thousands of years ago with Paleo-Indian peoples, the first inhabitants of what would become this distinctive American region. By the time Europeans arrived in the 15th century, the region was inhabited by the Mississippian people. European history in the region would begin with the earliest days of the exploration. Spain, France, and especially England explored and claimed parts of the region.

Starting in the 17th century, the history of the Southern United States developed unique characteristics that came from its economy based primarily on plantation agriculture and the ubiquitous and prevalent institution of slavery. Millions of enslaved Africans were imported to the United States primarily but not exclusively for forced labor in the south. While the great majority of Whites did not own slaves, slavery was nevertheless the foundation of the region's economy and social order. Questions of Southern slavery directly impacted the struggle for American independence throughout the South and gave the region additional power in Congress.

As industrial technologies including the cotton gin made slavery even more profitable, Southern states refused to ban slavery, perpetuating the division of the United States between free and slave states. Abraham Lincoln's election in 1860 caused South Carolina to secede which was soon followed by all other states in the region with the exception of the 'border states'. The breakaway states formed the Confederate States of America. Lincoln's Emancipation Proclamation brought freedom to Black slaves living in rebellious areas as soon as the US Army arrived. With a smaller economy, smaller population and (in some cases) widespread dissent among its white population, the Confederate States of America was unable to carry on a protracted struggle with the national government. The Thirteenth and Fourteenth amendments gave freedom, citizenship and civil rights to Black Americans all across the United States. The Fifteenth Amendment and Radical reconstruction laws gave Black men the vote, and for a few years they shared power in the South, despite violent attacks by the Ku Klux Klan. Reconstruction attempted to uplift the former enslaved but this crusade was abandoned in the Compromise of 1877 and Conservative white Southerners calling themselves Redeemers took control. Even though the Ku Klux Klan was suppressed, new White Supremacist organizations continued to terrorize Black Americans.

After the dissolving of a Populist movement in the 1890s that attempted to unite working-class blacks and whites Segregation laws were implemented all across the region by 1900. Compared to the North, the Southern United States lost its previous political and economic power and fell behind the rest of the United States for decades. Its agricultural economy was often based on Sharecropping practices. The New Deal and World War II brought about a generation of Liberal Southerners within the Democratic Party that looked to accelerate development.

Black Americans and their allies resisted Jim Crow and Segregation, initially with the Great Migration and later the civil rights movement. From a political and legal standpoint, many of these aims were realized by the Supreme Court's ruling on Brown v. Board of Education and the Civil Rights Act of 1964. Civil Rights coupled with the collapse of Black Belt agriculture has led some historians to postulate that a 'New South' based on Free Trade, Globalization, and cultural diversity has emerged. Meanwhile, the South has influenced the rest of the United States in a process called Southernization. The legacy of Slavery and Jim Crow continue to impact the region, which by the 21st century is the most populous area of the United States.

== Native American civilizations until 1730 ==
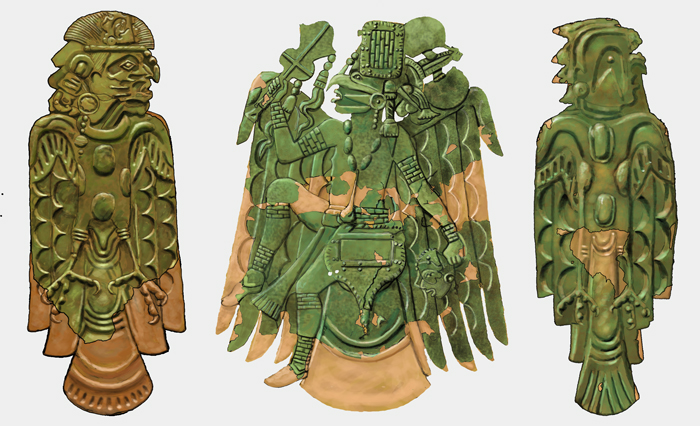
Three examples of Mississippian copper plates

Indigenous peoples of the Southeastern Woodlands, Southeastern cultures, or Southeast Indians are an ethnographic classification for Native Americans who have traditionally inhabited the area now part of the Southeastern United States and the northeastern border of Mexico, that share common cultural traits. The concept of a southeastern cultural region was developed by anthropologists, beginning with Otis Mason and Franz Boas in 1887. The boundaries of the region are defined more by shared cultural traits than by geographic distinctions.

=== Paleo-Indians ===
Around 20,000 years ago during the Last Glacial Maximum and its aftermath the first humans likely arrived in the Southern United States. Overall the region was not only colder but much drier. On average the coastline extended at least 50 miles out into the ocean, most of which would have had a patchy maritime Boreal forest adapted to colder conditions. Meanwhile much of the interior South had a taiga forest comparable to the Canadian Yukon and the Northwest Territories. The Floridian peninsula was much larger and was mostly a temperate savanna. Further west almost the whole of Texas consisted of a tropical desert.

There is debate among archeologists and historians over the exact when the peopling of the Americas and by extension the American Southeast took place. Cactus Hill near Richmond, Virginia may be one of the oldest archaeological sites in the Americas. If proven to have been inhabited 16,000 to 20,000 years ago, it would provide supporting evidence for pre-Clovis occupation of the Americas. The first well-dated evidence of human occupation in the south United States occurs around 9500 BC with the appearance of the earliest documented Americans, who are now referred to as Paleo-Indians. Paleoindians were hunter-gatherers that roamed in bands and frequently hunted megafauna including Wooly Mammoth and Giant short-faced bears.

=== Mound builders ===
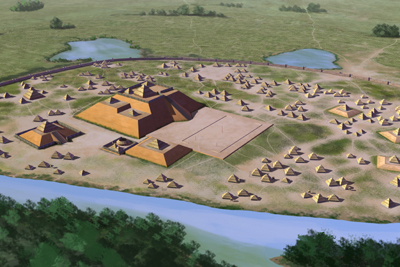
Etowah Indian Mounds, large Mississippian city and political center in modern Atlanta, Georgia

Daughter of the Son, Cherokee Myth

Several cultural stages, such as Archaic (c. 8000–1000 BC), Poverty Point, and the Woodland (c. 1000 BC – AD 1000), preceded what the Europeans found at the end of the 15th century – the Mississippian culture. Many pre-Columbian cultures in North America were collectively termed "Mound Builders", but the term has no formal meaning. It does not refer to specific people or archaeological culture but refers to the characteristic mound earthworks that indigenous peoples erected for an extended period of more than 5,000 years.

Mound builders were originally thought to be exclusively agricultural however early mounds found in Louisiana preceded such cultures and were products of hunter-gatherers. The first mound building was an early marker of political and social complexity among the cultures in the Eastern United States. Watson Brake in Louisiana, constructed about 3500 BCE during the Middle Archaic period, is the oldest known and dated mound complex in North America. It is one of 11 mound complexes from this period found in the Lower Mississippi Valley.

The namesake cultural trait of the Mound Builders was the building of mounds and other earthworks, typically flat-topped pyramids or platform mounds. They were generally built as part of complex villages. These cultures generally had developed hierarchical societies that had an elite. These commanded hundreds or even thousands of workers to dig up tons of earth with the hand tools available, move the soil long distances, and finally, workers to create the shape with layers of soil as directed by the builders.

By the 15th century, much of the area had been home to several regional variants of the Mississippian culture for centuries, an agrarian culture that flourished in the Midwestern, Eastern, and Southeastern United States. The Mississippian way of life began to develop around the 10th century in the Mississippi River Valley (for which it is named). The Mississippian culture was a complex, Native American culture that flourished in what is now the Southeastern United States from approximately 800 AD to 1500 AD. Among these cities Cahokia by St. Louis, was significant and the trading network was extensive; Etowah was a large walled city built close to the location of modern-day Atlanta. Natives had elaborate and lengthy trading routes connecting their main residential and ceremonial centers extending through the river valleys and from the East Coast to the Great Lakes, however the vast majority of mounds were concentrated in what would later become known as the Deep South. Prior to European contact, some Mississippian cultures were experiencing severe social stress as warfare increased and mound construction slowed or in other cases stopped completely, the societal decline was possibly caused by the Little Ice Age.

=== Post contact ===
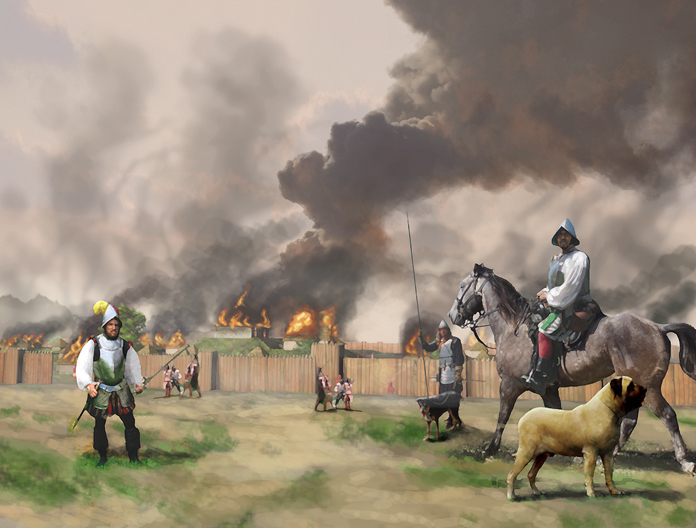
Herando De Soto burns Mabqila

The Mississippian shatter zone describes the period from 1540 to 1730 in the southeastern part of the present United States. During that time, the interaction between European explorers and colonists transformed the Native American cultures of that region. In 1540 dozens of chiefdoms and several paramount chiefdoms were scattered throughout the southeast. Chiefdoms featured a noble class ruling a large number of commoners and were characterized by villages and towns with large earthen mounds and complex religious practices. Some noted explorers who encountered and described the culture, by then in decline, included Pánfilo de Narváez (1528), Hernando de Soto (1540), and Pierre Le Moyne d'Iberville (1699).

The chiefdoms all disappeared by 1730. The most important factor in their gradual disappearance was the chaos induced by slave raids and the enslavement of tens of thousands of Indians. Other factors included epidemics of diseases of European origin and wars among themselves and with European colonists. Indian slaves usually ended up working on plantations in the U.S. or were exported to islands in the Caribbean Sea. The city of Charleston, South Carolina was the most important slave market. The Indian population in the southeast decreased from an estimated 500,000 in 1540 to 90,000 in 1730. The chiefdoms were replaced by simpler coalescent tribes and confederacies made up of survivors and refugees from the fragmenting nations.

Native American descendants of the mound-builders include Alabama, Apalachee, Caddo, Cherokee, Chickasaw, Choctaw, Creek, Guale, Hitchiti, Houma, and Seminole peoples, all of whom still reside in the South. Other peoples whose ancestral links to the Mississippian culture are less clear but were clearly in the region before the European incursion include the Catawba and the Powhatan.

== Spanish and French colonization (1519–1821) ==
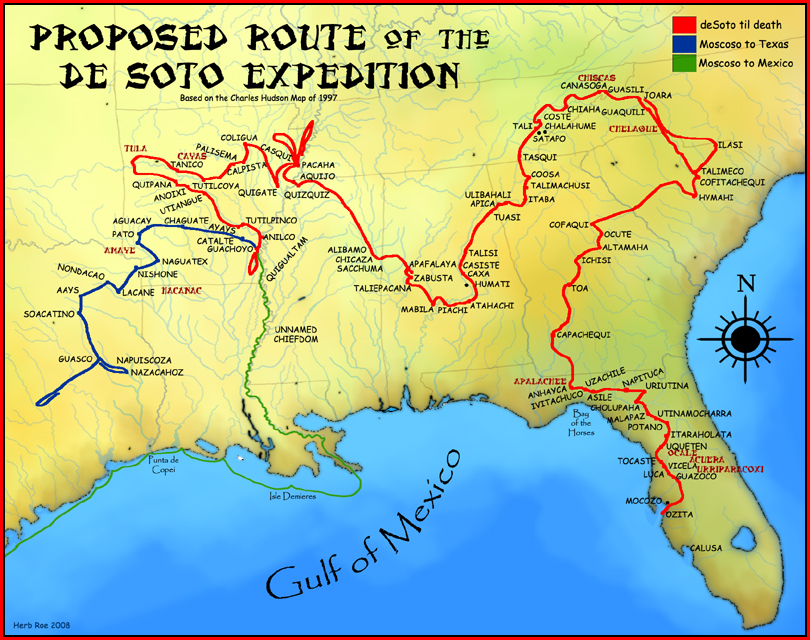
Hernando de Soto's expedition

Juan Ponce de León was the first European to come to the South when he landed in Florida in 1513. Alonso Álvarez de Pineda was the first European to see the Mississippi river, in 1519 when he sailed twenty miles up the river from the Gulf of Mexico. Hernando de Soto, a Spanish explorer and conquistador led the first European expedition deep into the territory in the 1540s, searching for gold, and a passage to China. A vast undertaking, de Soto's North American expedition ranged across parts of the modern states of Florida, Georgia, South Carolina, North Carolina, Tennessee, Alabama, Mississippi, Arkansas, Louisiana, and Texas.

Early settlement attempts largely failed. Tristán de Luna y Arellano's colony in what is now Pensacola failed in 1559. The first French settlement in the Southern United States was Fort Caroline, located in what is now Jacksonville, Florida, in 1562. It was established as a haven for the Huguenots but was destroyed by the Spanish in 1565, demonstrating the competitive nature of European colonization efforts.

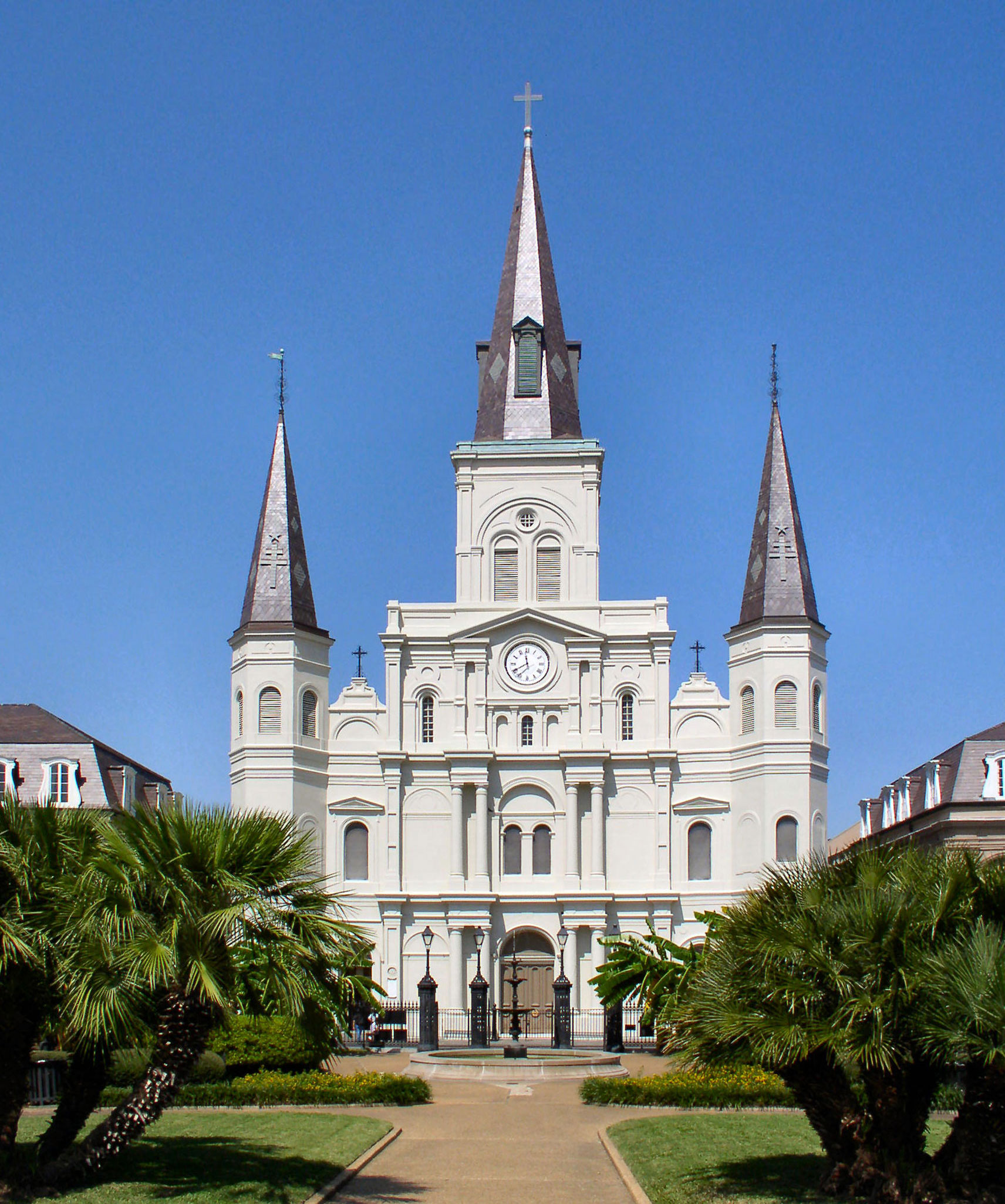
St. Louis Cathedral (New Orleans) the oldest cathedral in continuous use in the United States, built in Louisiana (New France)

More successful was Pedro Menéndez de Avilés's St. Augustine, founded in 1565. St. Augustine remains the oldest continuously inhabited European settlement in the continental United States. Spain used Florida as a strategic base to protect its treasure fleets and to counter other European powers' expansion attempts.

By the late 1600s, French explorers arrived from the north. Having built a fur trading network with Indians in the Great Lakes area, they began to explore the Mississippi River. The French called their territory Louisiana, in honor of their King Louis XIV. The most important French settlements were established at New Orleans and Mobile. Only a few settlers came from France directly, with others arriving from Haiti and Acadia.

Competition between European powers intensified in the early 18th century. Spanish Texas was one of the interior provinces of the colonial Viceroyalty of New Spain from 1519 until 1821, but the first Spanish settlers did not arrive until 1716. They operated several missions and a presidio to maintain a buffer between Spanish territory and the Louisiana district of New France. San Antonio was founded in 1719 and became the capital and largest settlement of Spanish Tejas.

France claimed Texas and set up several short-lived forts there, such as the one in Red River County, built in 1718, directly challenging Spanish territorial claims. Both Spanish and French colonists faced constant threats from Native American groups. The Lipan Apache menaced the newly founded Spanish colony until 1749 when the Spanish and Lipan concluded a peace treaty. Both the Spanish and Lipan were then threatened by Comanche raids until 1785 when the Spanish and Comanche negotiated a peace agreement.

The competition for control of the Mississippi River and Gulf Coast continued throughout this period, with each European power seeking to establish trade networks and military alliances with Native American tribes.

Most of the Spanish left Florida when it was turned over to Britain in 1763 following the Seven Years' War. However, Spain regained Florida in 1783 and continued to control it until transferring it to the United States in 1821. Spain also colonized parts of Alabama, Mississippi, Louisiana, and Texas throughout this period.

By 1821, most European colonial claims in the South had been transferred to the United States or Mexico, setting the stage for American territorial expansion and the development of distinctly Southern institutions.

== British colonial era (1585–1775) ==
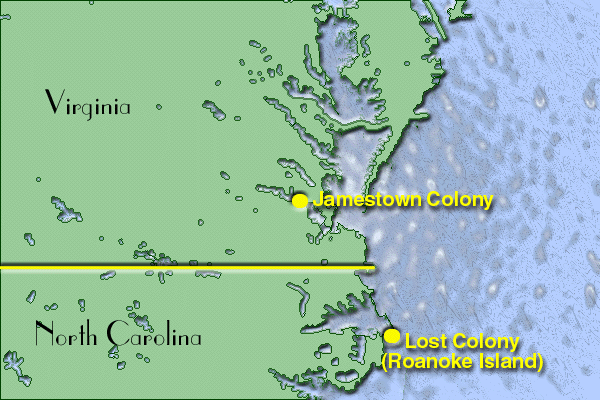
Jamestown and Roanoke Island colonies

=== Early attempts and first permanent settlements (1585–1650) ===
In 1585, an expedition organized by Walter Raleigh established the first English settlement in the New World, on Roanoke Island in North Carolina. The colony failed to prosper, however, and the colonists were retrieved the following year by English ships. In 1587, Raleigh again sent out a group of colonists to Roanoke. From this colony, the first recorded European birth in North America, a child named Virginia Dare, was reported. That group of colonists disappeared and is known as the "Lost Colony". Many people theorize that they were either killed or taken in by local tribes.

Like New England, the South was originally settled by English Protestants. The English established their first permanent colony in America in Jamestown, Virginia, in 1607. Settlement of Chesapeake Bay was driven by a desire to obtain precious metals, specifically gold. The colony was technically still within Spanish territorial claims, yet far enough from most Spanish settlements to avoid colonial clashes. Early in the history of the colony, it became clear that the claims of gold deposits were vastly exaggerated. Referred to as the "Starving Time" of the Jamestown colony, the years from the time of landing in 1607 until 1609 were rife with famine and instability. However, Native American support, in addition to reinforcements from Britain, sustained the small colony. Due to continued political and economic instability, however, the charter of the Colony of Virginia was revoked in 1624. The primary cause of this revocation was the revelation that hundreds of settlers were dead or missing following an attack in 1622 by Native American tribes led by Opechancanough. A royal charter was established for Virginia, yet the House of Burgesses, formed in 1619, was allowed to continue as political leadership for the colony in conjunction with a royal governor.

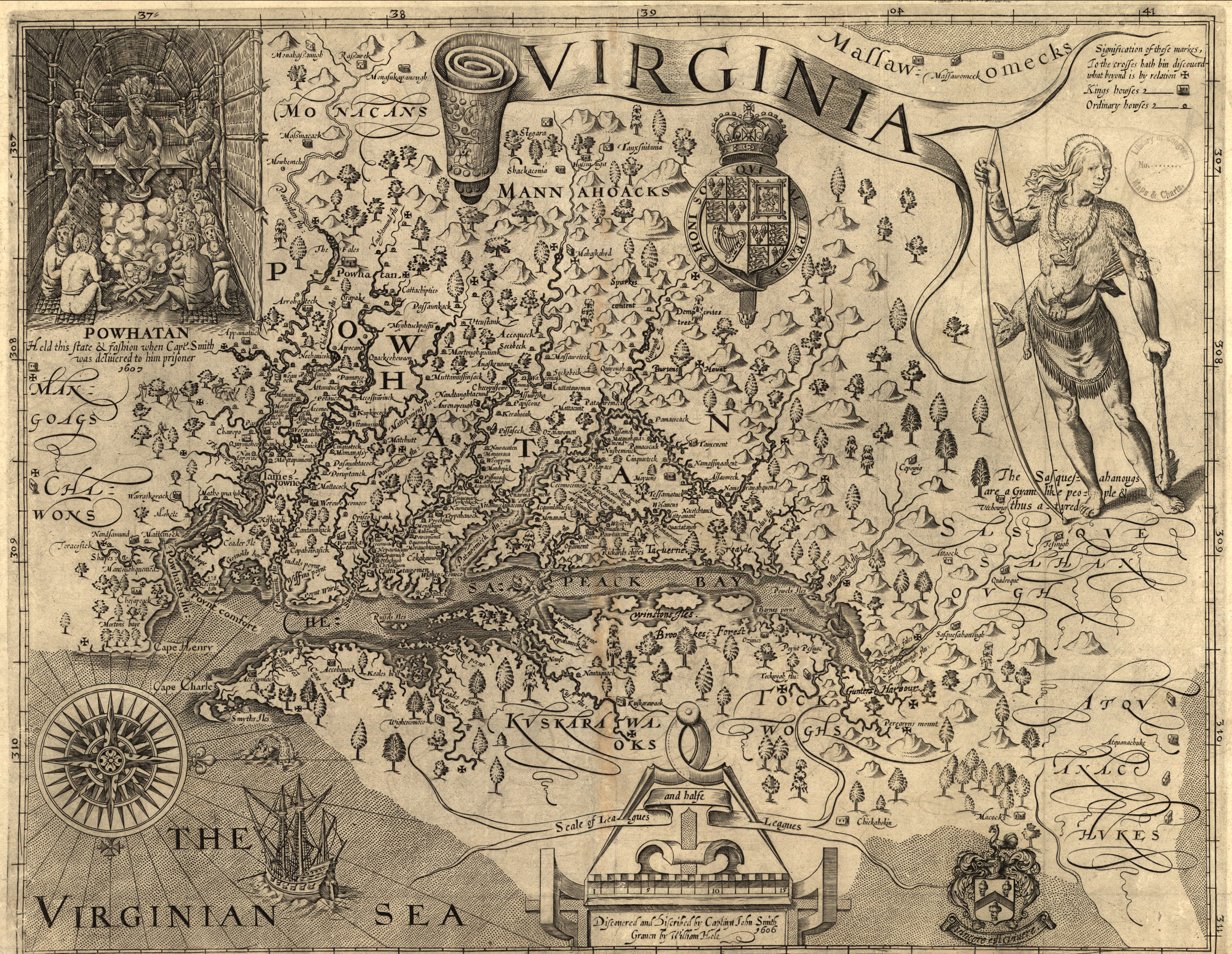
Virginia map, on the eve of colonization 1606

George Calvert, 1st Baron Baltimore, applied to Charles I for a royal charter for what was to become the Province of Maryland. After Calvert died in April 1632, the charter for "Maryland Colony" (in Latin Terra Mariae) was granted to his son, Cecilius Calvert, 2nd Baron Baltimore, on June 20, 1632. Maryland soon became one of the few predominantly Catholic regions among the English colonies in North America. Maryland was also one of the key destinations where the government sent tens of thousands of English convicts punished by sentences of transportation.

=== Colonial society and economy in the 17th century (1650–1700) ===
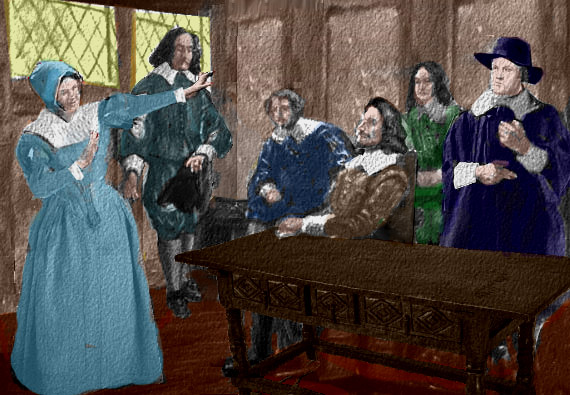
Dramatized Scene from Jamestown court case in 1623. It is the first breach of promise suit in the English-speaking United States.

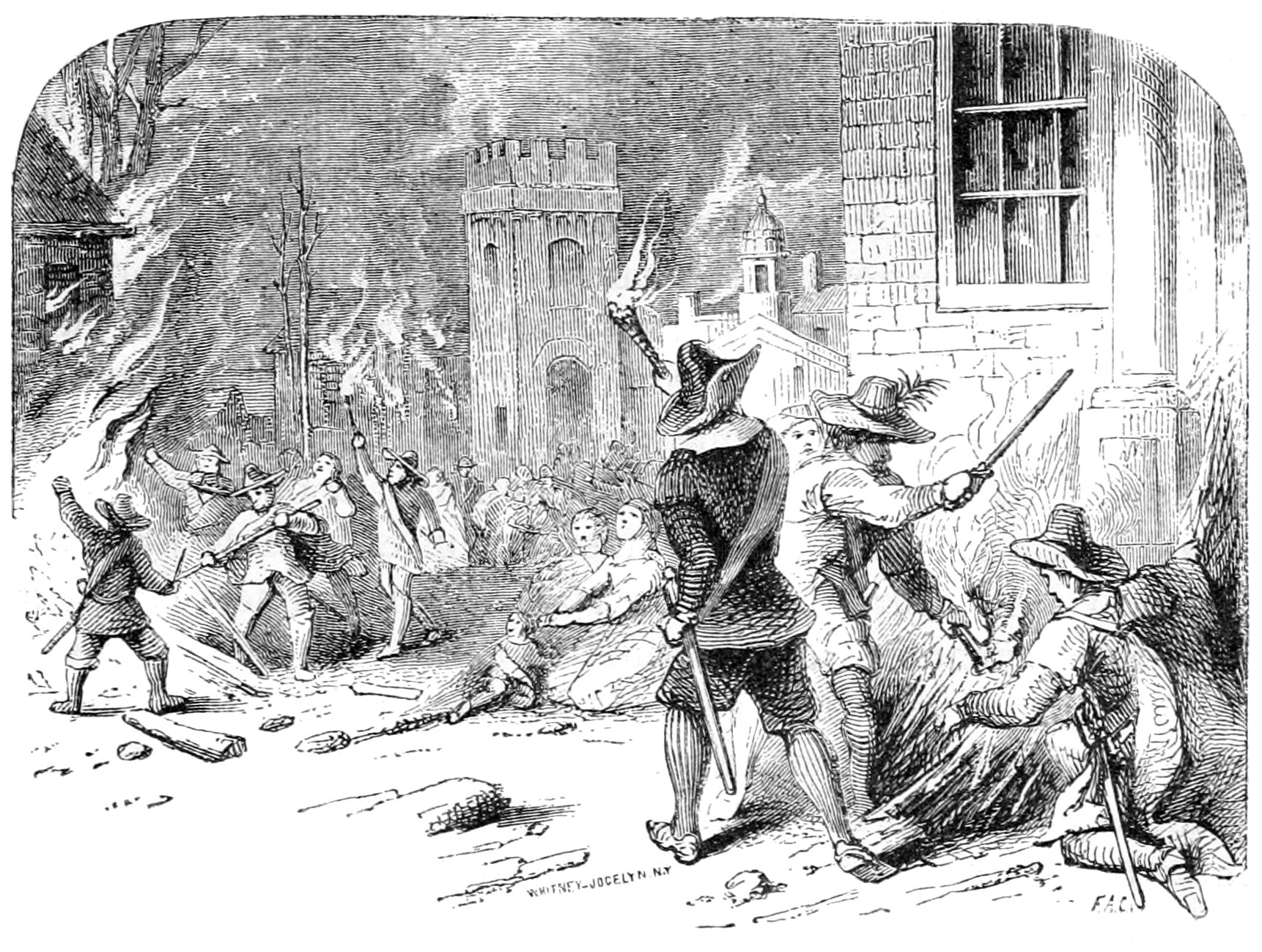
The Burning of Jamestown during Bacon's Rebellion

A key figure in the region's political and cultural development was William Berkeley, who served, with some interruptions, as governor of Virginia from 1645 until 1675. His desire for an elite immigration to Virginia led to the "Second Sons" policy, in which younger sons of English aristocrats were recruited to emigrate to Virginia. Berkeley also emphasized the headright system, the offering of large tracts of land to those arriving in the colony. This early immigration by an elite contributed to the development of an aristocratic political and social structure in the South.

English colonists, especially young indentured servants, continued to arrive along the southern Atlantic coast. Virginia became a prosperous English colony. During this period, life expectancy was often low, and indentured servants came from overpopulated European areas. With the lower price of servants compared to slaves, and the high mortality of the servants, planters often found it much more economical to use servants initially.

From the introduction of tobacco in 1613, its cultivation began to form the basis of the early Southern economy. In 1640, the Virginia General Court recorded the earliest documentation of lifetime slavery when it sentenced John Punch to lifetime servitude under Hugh Gwyn for running away.

Bacon's Rebellion was an unsuccessful armed rebellion by some Virginia settlers that took place from 1676 to 1677, led by Nathaniel Bacon. Thousands of Virginians from all races and classes (including those in indentured servitude) rose up in arms against Berkeley, chasing him from Jamestown and ultimately torching the settlement. Edmund S. Morgan's 1975 classic connected the threat of Bacon's Rebellion with the colony's transition over to slavery. This marked a crucial turning point as the South began its transition from indentured servitude to race-based slavery.

=== Expansion of slavery and plantation agriculture (1670–1740) ===
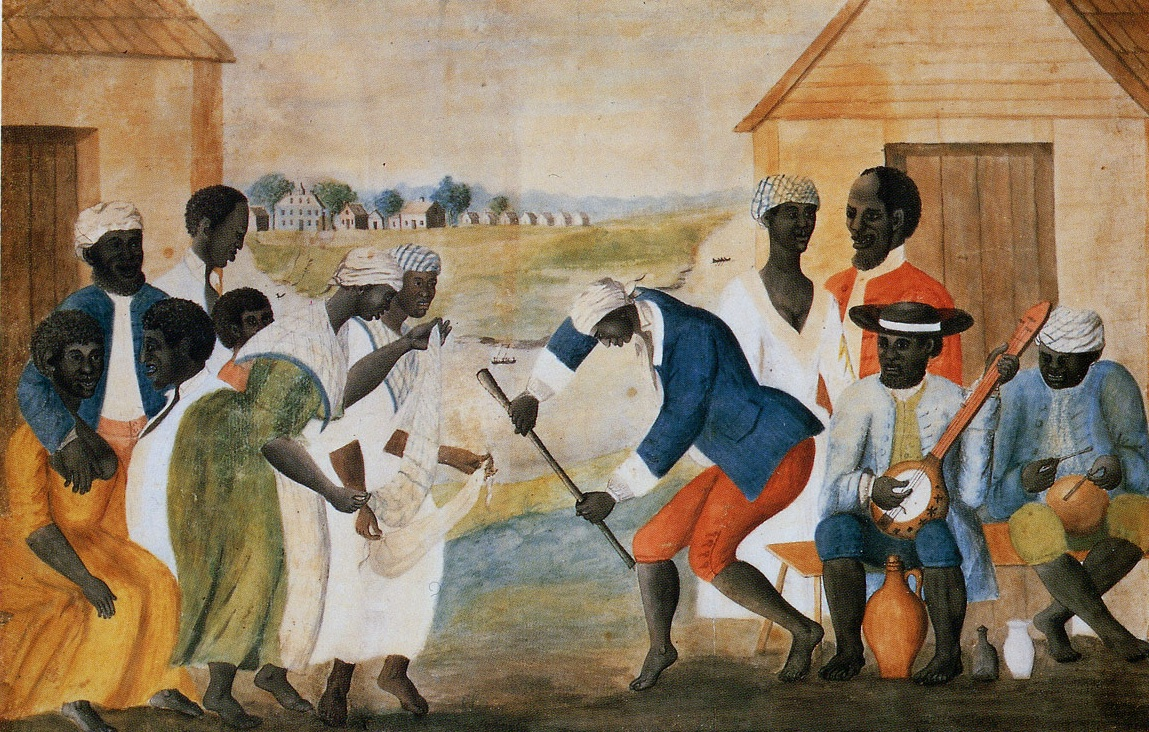
The Old Plantation (circa 1785), attributed to slave owner John Rose. Watercolor shows slaves dancing and playing instruments of African origin in Beaufort County, South Carolina.

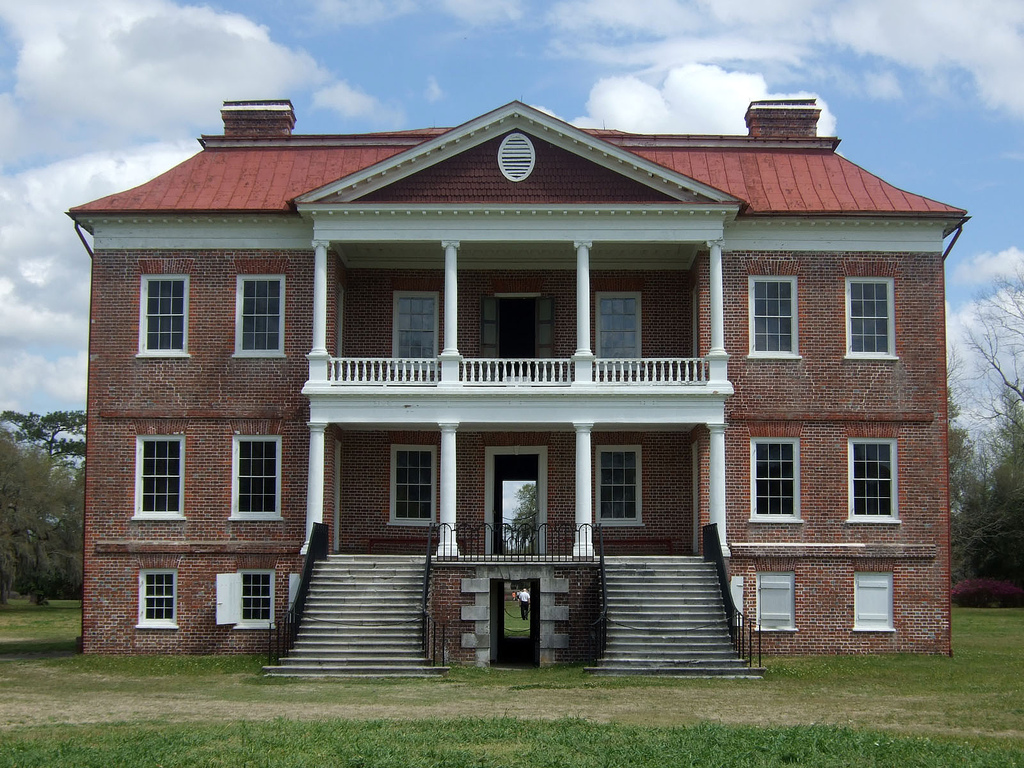
Drayton Hall, a South Carolina slave plantation

The Province of North Carolina developed differently from South Carolina almost from the beginning. In the 1650s and 1660s, settlers (mostly English) moved south from Virginia, in addition to runaway servants and fur trappers. They settled chiefly in the Albemarle borderlands region. In 1665, the Crown issued a second charter to resolve territorial questions, and the division of the province into North and South became official in 1712.

By the late 17th century and early 18th century, slaves became economically viable sources of labor for the growing tobacco culture in the Chesapeake and rice cultivation in South Carolina. Much of the slave trade was conducted as part of the "triangular trade", a three-way exchange of slaves, rum, and sugar. The plantations of South Carolina often were modeled on Caribbean plantations, with enslaved Africans bringing crucial knowledge of rice cultivation that made the colony prosperous. The Barbados Slave Code served as the basis for the slave codes adopted in Carolina (1696), Georgia, and other colonies.

Slavery in the Colonial period was not without resistance. The most notable rebellion in the Southern Colonies was the Stono Rebellion of 1739. Portuguese-speaking Angolans in South Carolina, with prior military training, attempted to escape to Catholic Spanish Florida. The rebellion was intercepted by the South Carolina militia and almost all participants were executed. The rebellion profoundly changed slavery in South Carolina—the Negro Act of 1740 placed harsh regulations on slaves, including a provision that allowed any White colonist to inspect any slave for any reason.

=== Mature colonial South (1740–1775) ===
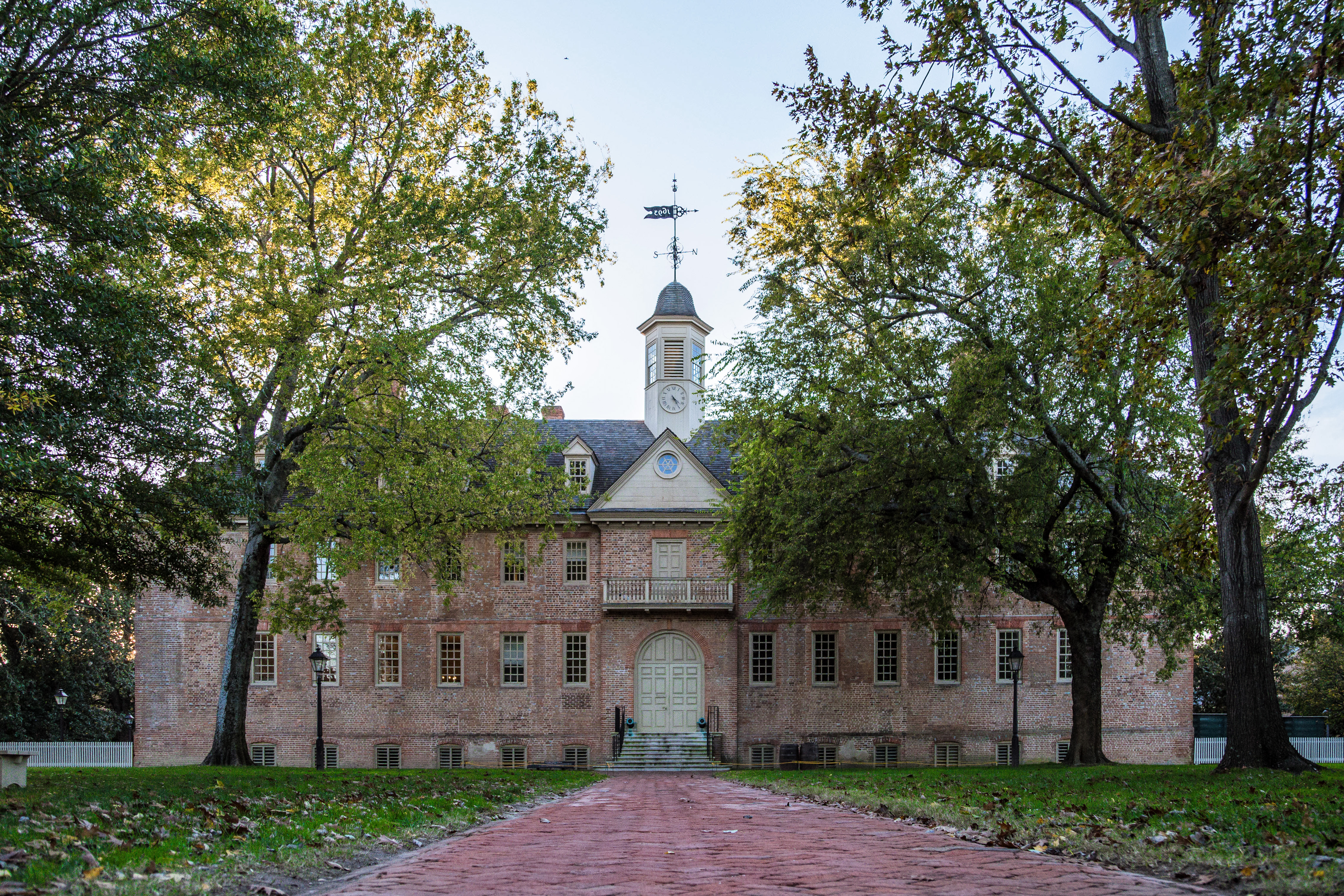
College of William and Mary in Williamsburg, Virginia, the first college in the South, founded 1693.

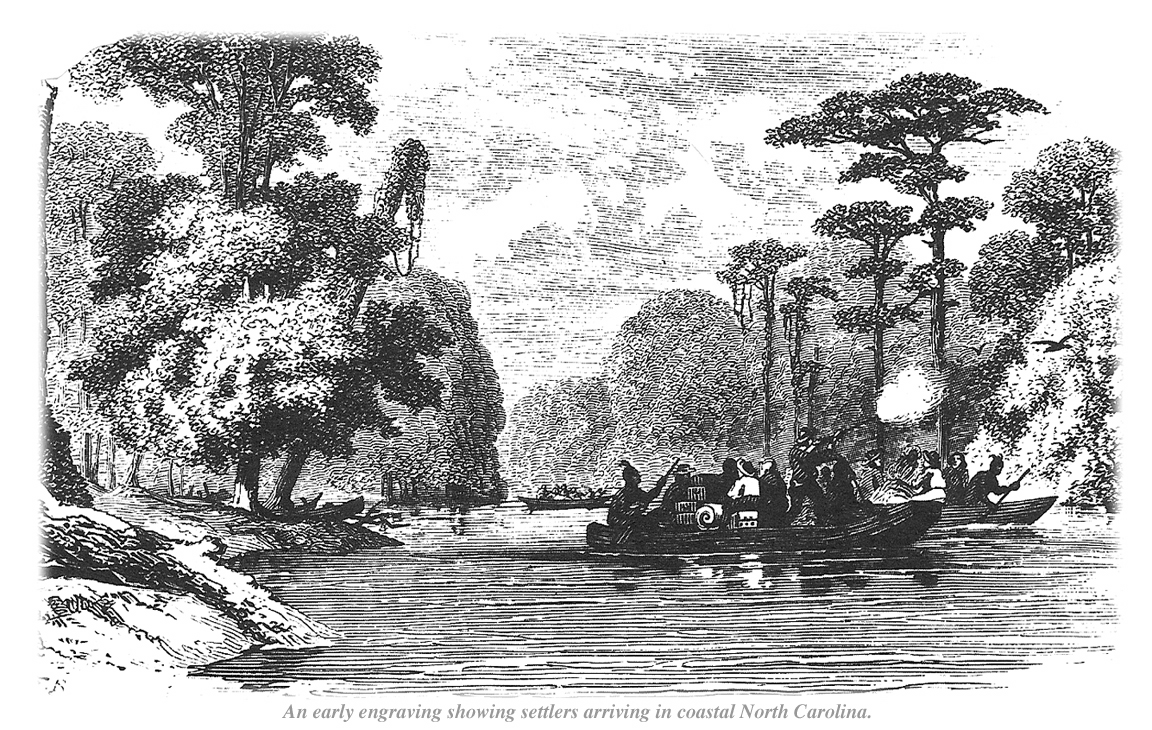
Engraving showing early North Carolina settlers settle the region

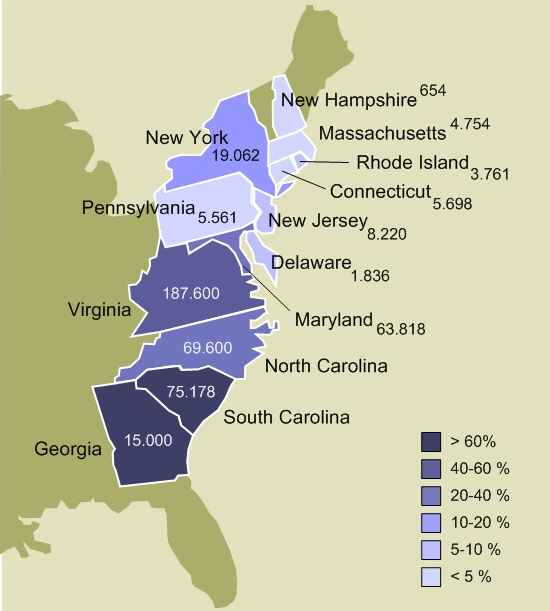
A map of the Thirteen Colonies in 1770, showing the number of slaves in each colony

By the mid-18th century, the economies of the Southern colonies were firmly tied to agriculture and slave labor. The great plantations were formed by wealthy colonists who accumulated vast wealth from their land. Tobacco dominated in the upper colonies (Maryland, Virginia, and portions of North Carolina), while rice and indigo cultivation focused in the lower colonies of South Carolina and Georgia. Cotton did not become a mainstay until much later, after the cotton gin of 1794 greatly increased its profitability.

The plantation owners built an aristocratic lifestyle, but they represented only a small portion of Southern society. The majority were small yeoman farmers who worked small tracts of land to feed themselves and trade locally. They developed a political activism in response to the growing oligarchy of the plantation owners, with many politicians from this era being yeoman farmers speaking out to protect their rights as free men.

Charleston became a booming trade town for the southern colonies. The abundance of pine trees in the area provided raw materials for shipyards to develop, and the harbor provided a safe port for English ships. The colonists exported tobacco, indigo and rice and imported tea, sugar, and slaves. After the late 17th century, the economies of the North and the South began to diverge, with the Southern emphasis on export production contrasting with the Northern emphasis on food production.

The last major colonial experiment was Georgia, envisioned by British General James Oglethorpe as a colony which would serve as a haven for English subjects who had been imprisoned for debt and "the worthy poor." Originally designed as a buffer against Spanish Florida and initially prohibiting slavery, Georgia's ban on slavery was lifted by 1751 and the colony became a royal colony by 1752.

By 1775, the Southern colonies had developed a distinctive society based on plantation agriculture, slave labor, and hierarchical social structures. This economic and social system would play a crucial role in the tensions leading to the American Revolution.

== American Revolution (1775–1789) ==
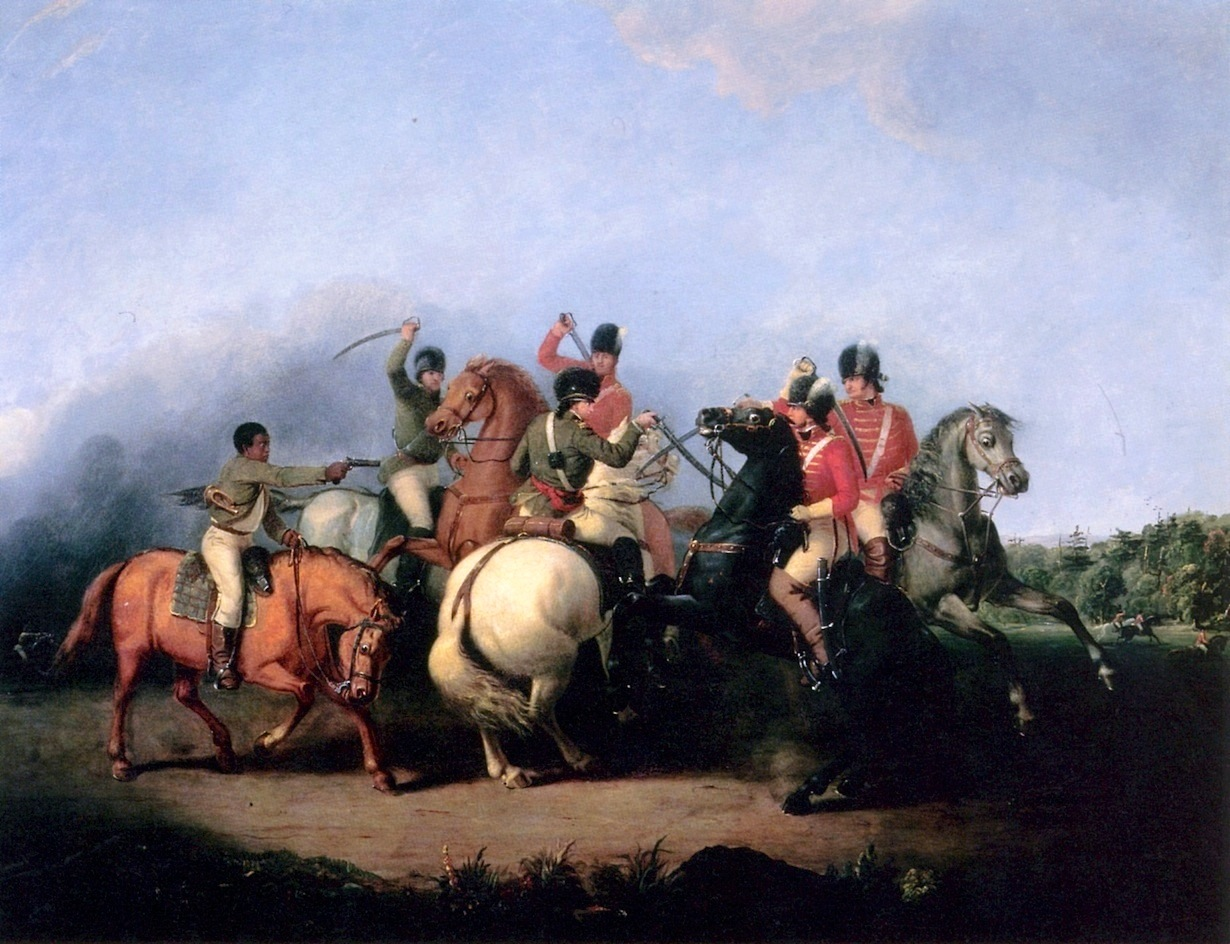
Battle of Cowpens, South Carolina (1781)

Some southern colonies, led by Virginia, gave support for the Patriot cause. Georgia, the newest, smallest, most exposed and militarily most vulnerable colony, hesitated briefly before joining the other 12 colonies in Congress. South Carolina meanwhile had the largest loyalist support of any state. As soon as news arrived of the Battles of Lexington and Concord in April 1775, Patriot forces took control of every colony. After the combat began, Governor Dunmore of Virginia was forced to flee to a British warship off the coast. In late 1775 he issued a proclamation offering freedom to slaves who fought for the British Army. Over 1,000 volunteered and served in British uniforms, chiefly in the Ethiopian Regiment. However, they were defeated in the Battle of Great Bridge, and most of them died of disease. The Royal Navy took Dunmore and other officials home in August 1776, and also carried to freedom 300 surviving former slaves.

Thomas Jefferson wrote the first draft of the Declaration of Independence, condemning the United Kingdom for bringing slaves to North America despite being a slaveowner himself. Other delegates insisted on removal of any mention of slavery from the document. South Carolina's delegation ensured the continuance of the institution of slavery. Delegate Thomas Lynch threatened to break away from the country if congress entertained any discussion on slavery, indicating that for South Carolina preserving slavery was more important than American nationhood. Meanwhile Edward Rutledge tried unsuccessfully to expel black soldiers from the Continental Army

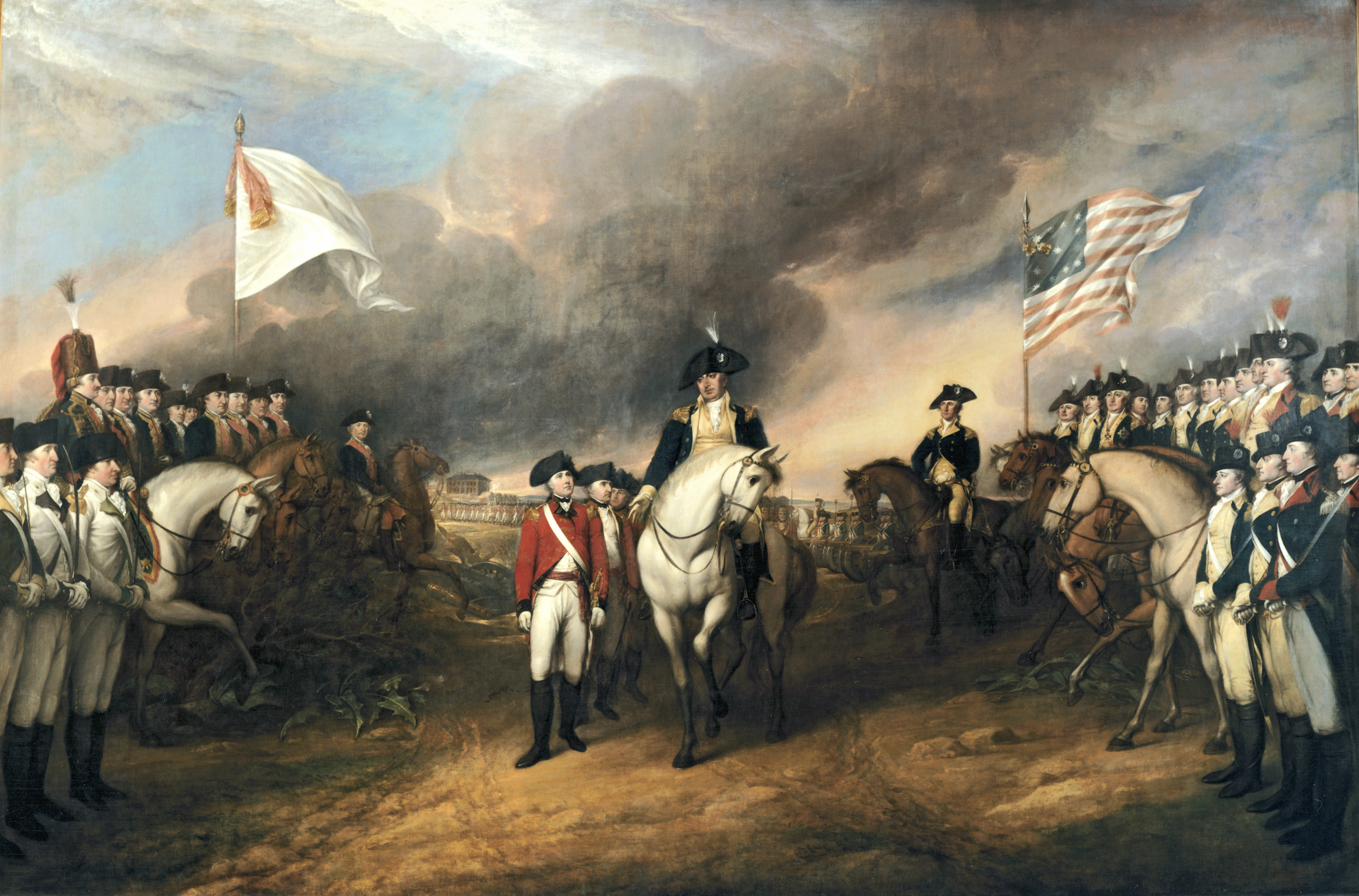
The siege of Yorktown ended with the surrender of a second British army, marking effective British defeat in North America during the American Revolutionary War.

After their defeat at Saratoga in 1777 and the entry of the French into the American Revolutionary War, the British turned their attention to the South. With fewer regular troops at their disposal, the British commanders developed a "southern strategy" that relied heavily on volunteer soldiers and militia from the Loyalist element. Beginning in late December 1778, the British captured Savannah and controlled the Georgia coastline. In 1780 they seized Charleston, capturing a large American army. A significant victory at the Battle of Camden meant that royal forces soon controlled most of Georgia and South Carolina. The British set up a network of forts inland, expecting the Loyalists would rally to the flag. Far too few Loyalists turned out however, and the British had to fight their way north into North Carolina and Virginia with a severely weakened army. Behind them most of the territory they had already captured dissolved into a chaotic guerrilla war, fought predominantly between bands of Loyalist and Patriot militia, with the Patriots retaking the areas the British had previously gained. In January 1781, the Battle of Cowpens near Cowpens, South Carolina, was a turning point in the American reconquest of South Carolina from the British.

The British army marched to Yorktown, Virginia, where they expected to be rescued by a British fleet. The fleet showed up but so did a larger French fleet, so the British fleet after the Battle of the Chesapeake returned to New York for reinforcements, leaving General Cornwallis trapped by the much larger American and French armies under Washington. He surrendered. The most prominent Loyalists, especially those who joined Loyalist regiments, were evacuated by the Royal Navy.

Virginia Statue for religious Freedom, by Thomas Jefferson, passed into Virginia Law in 1786

After the upheaval of the American Revolution effectively came to an end at the Siege of Yorktown (1781), the South became a major political force in the development of the United States. With the ratification of the Articles of Confederation, the South found political stability and a minimum of federal interference in state affairs. However, with this stability came a weakness in its design, and the inability of the Confederation to maintain economic viability eventually forced the creation of the United States Constitution in Philadelphia in 1787. Importantly, Southerners of 1861 often believed their secessionist efforts and the Civil War paralleled the American Revolution, as a military and ideological "replay" of the latter.

Southern leaders were able to protect their sectional interests during the Constitutional Convention of 1787, preventing the insertion of any explicit anti-slavery position in the Constitution. Moreover, they were able to force the inclusion of the "fugitive slave clause" and the "Three-Fifths Compromise". Nevertheless, Congress retained the power to regulate the slave trade. Twenty years after the ratification of the Constitution, the law-making body prohibited the importation of slaves, effective January 1, 1808. While North and South were able to find common ground to gain the benefits of a strong Union, the unity achieved in the Constitution masked deeply rooted differences in economic and political interests.

In the South, agrarian laissez-faire formed the basis of political culture. Led by Thomas Jefferson and James Madison, this agrarian position is characterized by the epitaph on the grave of Jefferson. While including his "condition bettering" roles in the foundation of the University of Virginia, and the writing of the Declaration of Independence and the Virginia Statute for Religious Freedom, absent from the epitaph was his role as President of the United States. The development of Southern political thought thus focused on the ideal of the yeoman farmer; i.e., those who are tied to the land also have a vested interest in the stability and survival of the government.

The Revolution provided a shock to slavery in the South and other regions of the new country. Thousands of slaves took advantage of wartime disruption to find their own freedom, catalyzed by the British Governor Dunmore of Virginia's promise of freedom for service. Many others were removed by Loyalist owners and became slaves elsewhere in the British Empire. Between 1770 and 1790, there was a sharp decline in the percentage of blacks – from 61% to 44% in South Carolina and from 45% to 36% in Georgia. In addition, some slaveholders were inspired to free their slaves after the Revolution. In the Upper South, more than 10% of all blacks were free by 1810, a significant expansion from pre-war proportions of less than 1% free.

== Antebellum era (1789–1861) ==
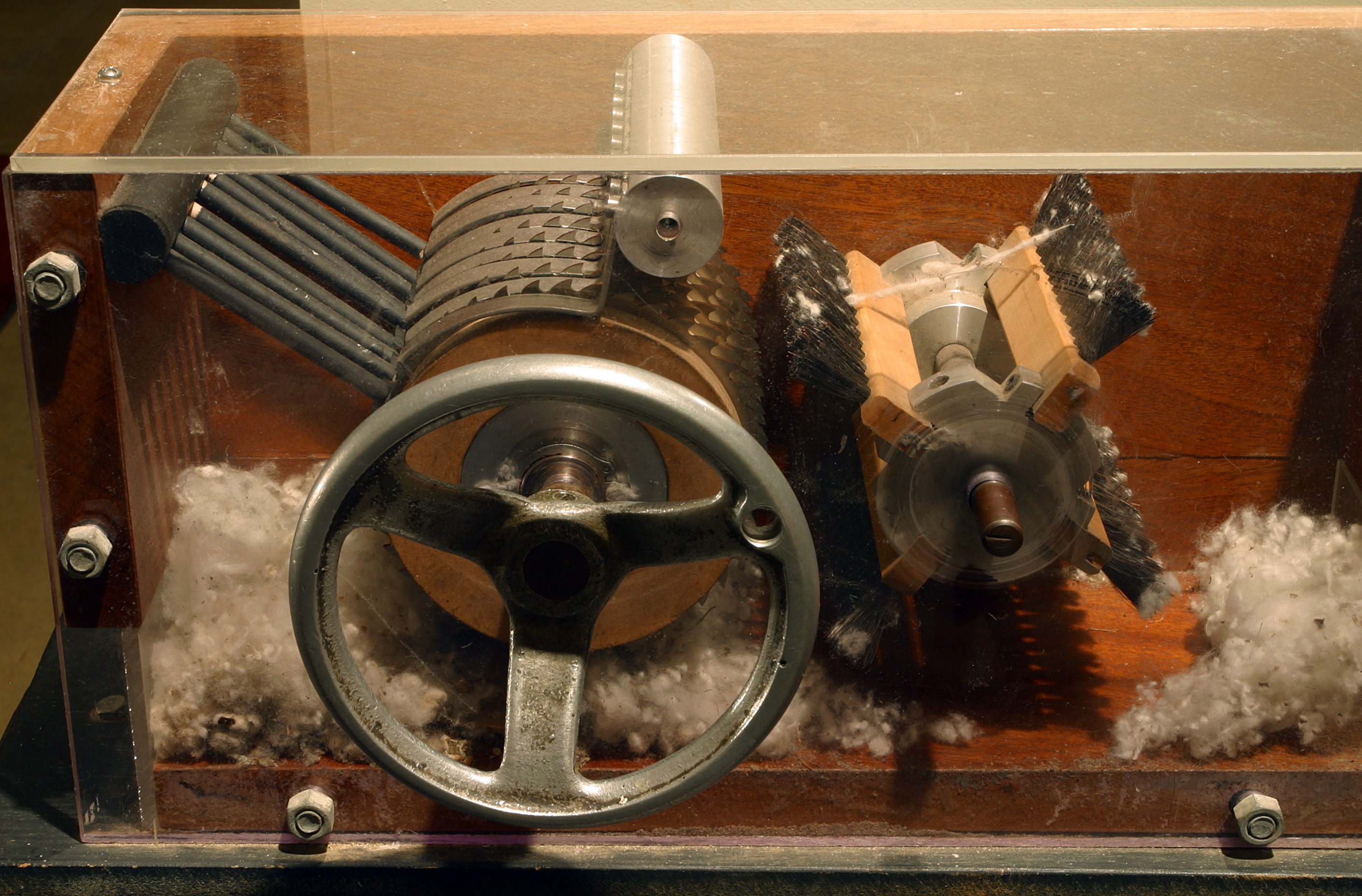
The invention of the cotton gin catalyzed the rapid expansion of the plantation economy and, thus, slavery.

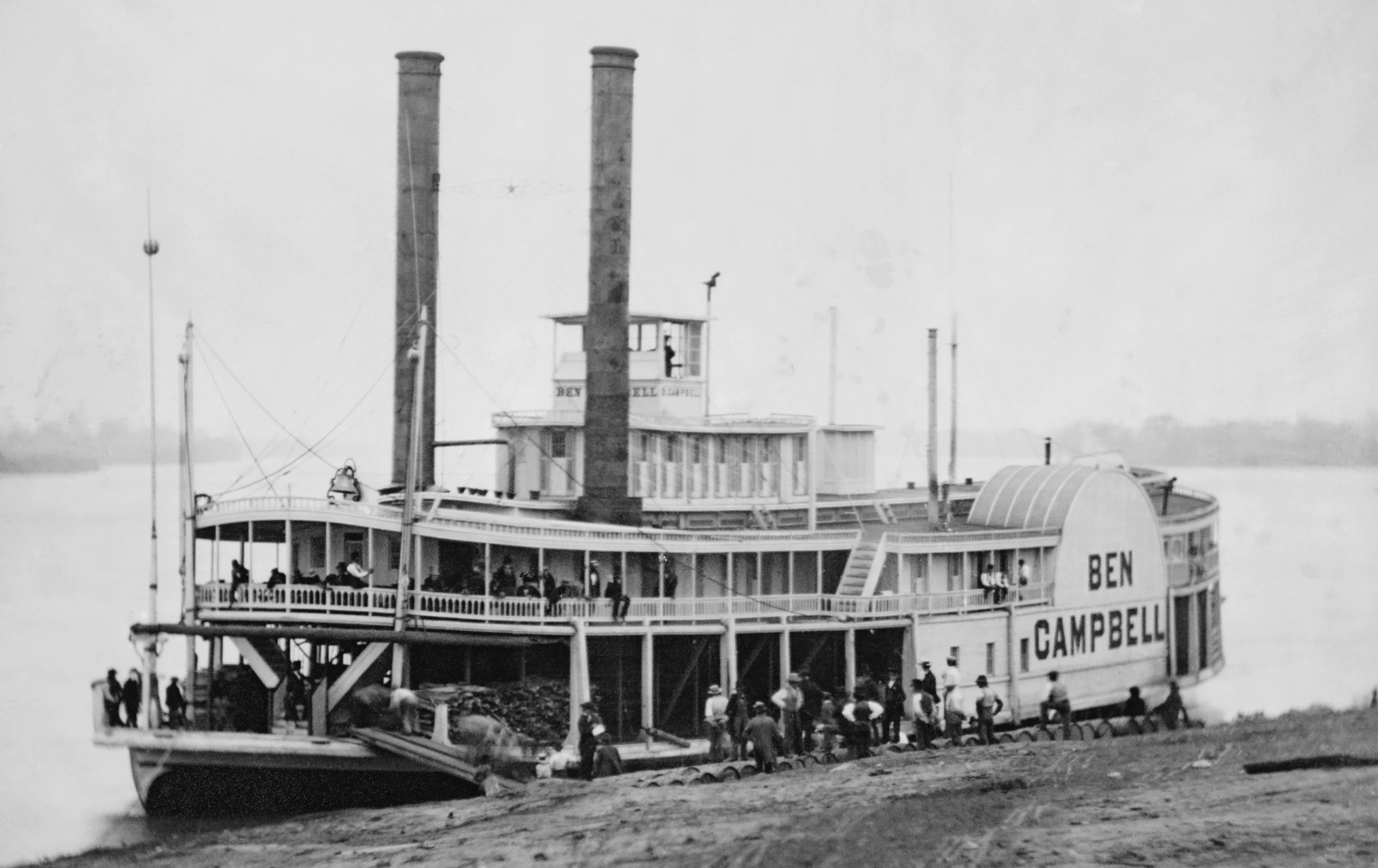
Steamboat, Ben Campbell 1850s. Steamboats were an iconic symbol of the Antebellum Mississippi River

From a cultural and social standpoint, the "Old South" is used to describe the rural, agriculturally-based, slavery-reliant economy and society in the Antebellum South, prior to the American Civil War (1861–1865), in contrast to the "New South" of the post-Reconstruction Era.

There were almost 700,000 enslaved persons in the U.S. in 1790, which equated to approximately 18 percent of the total population, or roughly one in every six people. This had persisted through the 17th and 18th centuries, but the invention of the cotton gin by Eli Whitney in the 1790s made slavery even more profitable and caused a larger plantation system developed. In the 15 years between the invention of the cotton gin and the passage of the Act Prohibiting Importation of Slaves, an increase in the slave trade occurred, furthering the slave system in the United States.

As the country expanded its territory and economy west, New Orleans was the third largest American city in population by 1840. The success of the city was based on the growth of international trade associated with products being shipped to and from the interior of the country down the Mississippi River. New Orleans also had the largest slave market in the country, as traders brought slaves by ship and overland to sell to planters across the Deep South. The city was a cosmopolitan port with a variety of jobs that attracted more immigrants than other areas of the South. Because of a lack of investment, however, construction of railroads to span the region lagged behind the North. People relied most heavily on river traffic for getting their crops to market and for transportation.

=== Jacksonian democracy ===
Jacksonian democracy was a 19th-century political philosophy in the United States that expanded suffrage to most white men over the age of 21 and restructured a number of federal institutions. Originating with the seventh U.S. president, Andrew Jackson, it became the nation's dominant political worldview for a generation. This era, called the Jacksonian Era or Second Party System by historians and political scientists, lasted roughly from Jackson's 1828 election as president until slavery became the dominant issue with the passage of the Kansas–Nebraska Act in 1854 and the political repercussions of the American Civil War dramatically reshaped American politics. It emerged when the long-dominant Democratic-Republican Party became factionalized around the 1824 United States presidential election. Jackson's supporters began to form the modern Democratic Party.

Broadly speaking, the era was characterized by a democratic spirit. It built upon Jackson's equal political policy, subsequent to ending what he termed a monopoly of government by elites. Even before the Jacksonian era began, suffrage had been extended to a majority of white male adult citizens, a result which the Jacksonians celebrated. Jacksonian democracy also promoted the strength of the presidency and the executive branch at the expense of the United States Congress, while also seeking to broaden the public's participation in government. The Jacksonians demanded elected, not appointed, judges and rewrote many state constitutions to reflect the new values. In national terms, they favored geographical expansionism, justifying it in terms of manifest destiny. There was usually a consensus among both Jacksonians and Whigs that battles over slavery should be avoided.

=== Indian removal ===
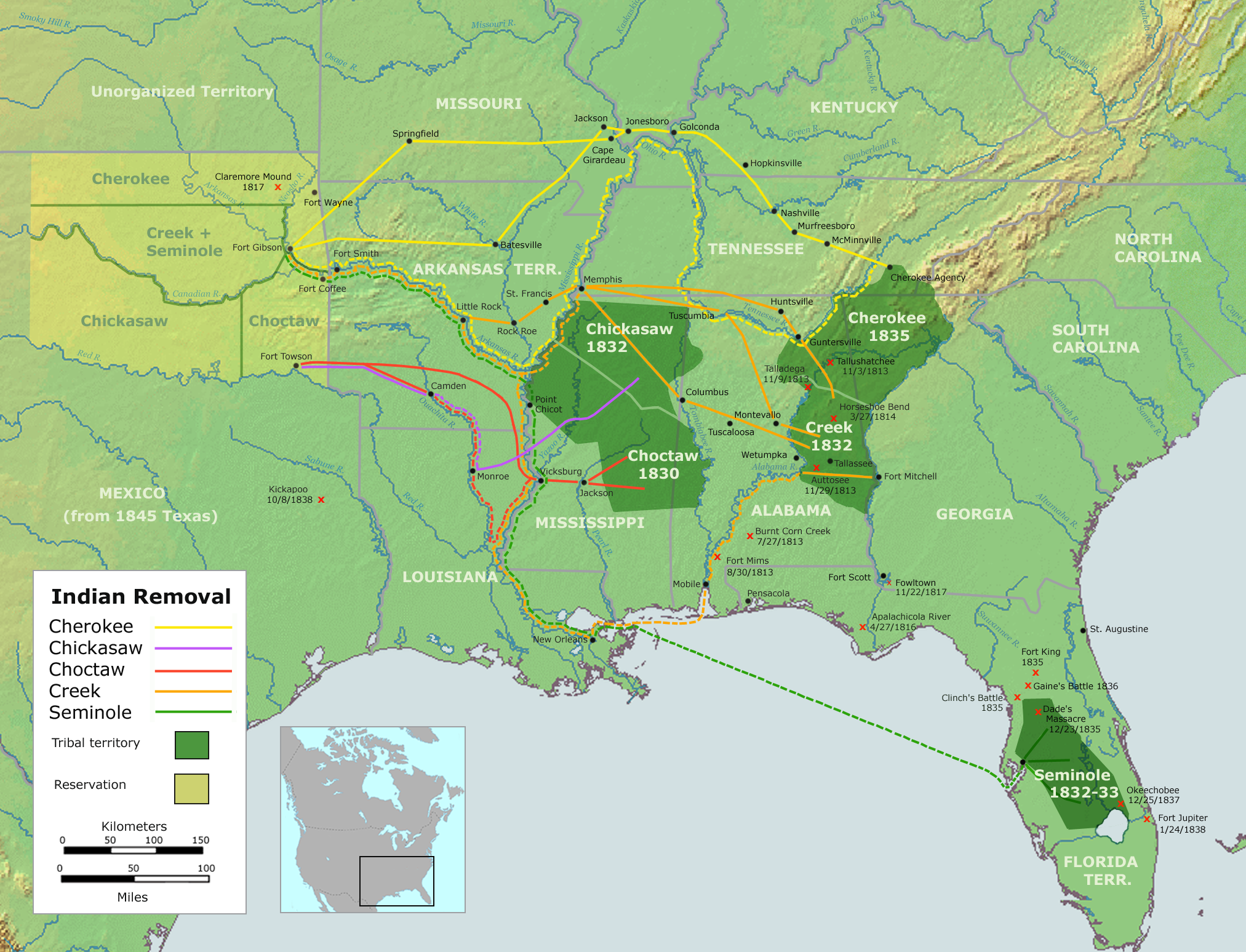
The Indian Removal Act resulted in the transplantation of several Native American tribes and the Trail of Tears.

In 1830, Congress passed the Indian Removal Act, which authorized the president to negotiate treaties that exchanged Native American tribal lands in the eastern states for lands west of the Mississippi River. Its goal was primarily to remove Native Americans, including the Five Civilized Tribes, from the American Southeast – they occupied land that settlers wanted.

Jacksonian Democrats demanded the forcible removal of native populations who refused to acknowledge state laws to reservations in the West. Whigs and religious leaders opposed the move as inhumane. Thousands of deaths resulted from the relocations, as seen in the Cherokee Trail of Tears. The Trail of Tears resulted in approximately 2,000–8,000 of the 16,543 relocated Cherokee perishing along the way. Many of the Seminole Indians in Florida refused to move west; they fought the Army for years in the Seminole Wars. The Civilized Tribes were permitted to bring 4,000 black slaves with them; some freedmen also went west with the tribes.

=== Antebellum slavery ===
Narrative of the life of Frederick Douglass, Chapter 4. Douglass describes wealth, oppression and control on a Maryland plantation.

Every Northern state abolished slavery by 1804. The Continental Congress abolished slavery in the Northwest Territory and its future states. Therefore, by 1804 the Mason–Dixon line (the border between free Pennsylvania and slave Maryland) became the dividing mark between "free" and "slave" states. About a quarter of white Southern families were slave owners, with most being independent yeoman farmers. Nevertheless, the slave system represented the basis of the Southern social and economic structure, and thus even the majority of non-slave-owners opposed any suggestions for terminating that system, whether through outright abolition or case-by-case manumission.

The southern plantation economy was dependent on foreign trade, and the success of this trade helps explain why southern elites and some white yeomen were so violently opposed to abolition. There is considerable debate among scholars about whether or not the slaveholding South was a capitalist society and economy. The replacement for the importation of slaves from abroad was increased domestic production. Virginia and Maryland had little new agricultural development, and their need for slaves was mostly for replacements for decedents. Normal reproduction more than supplied these: Virginia and Maryland had surpluses of slaves. Their tobacco farms were "worn out" and the climate was not suitable for cotton or sugar cane. The surplus was even greater because slaves were encouraged to reproduce (though they could not marry). The pro-slavery Virginian Thomas Roderick Dew wrote in 1832 that Virginia was a "negro-raising state"; i.e. Virginia "produced" slaves. According to him, in 1832 Virginia exported "upwards of 6,000 slaves" per year, "a source of wealth to Virginia". A newspaper from 1836 gives the figure as 40,000, earning for Virginia an estimated $24,000,000 per year. Demand for slaves was the strongest in what was then the southwest of the country: Alabama, Mississippi, and Louisiana, and, later, Texas, Arkansas, and Missouri. Here there was abundant land suitable for plantation agriculture, which young men with some capital established. This was expansion of the white, monied population: younger men seeking their fortune.

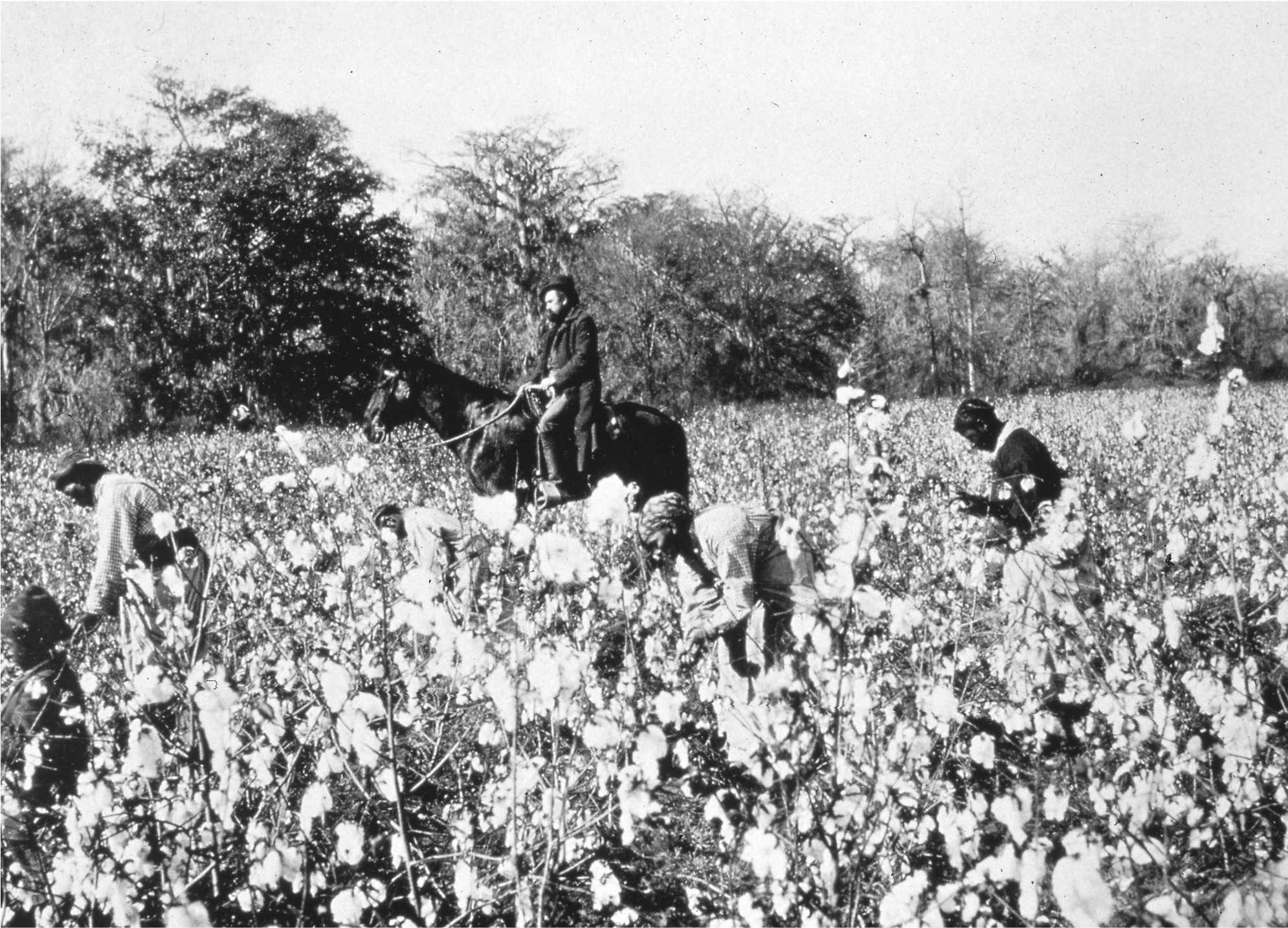
An overseer on horseback observes the enslaved people picking cotton, c. 1850

Family of slaves in Georgia, circa 1850

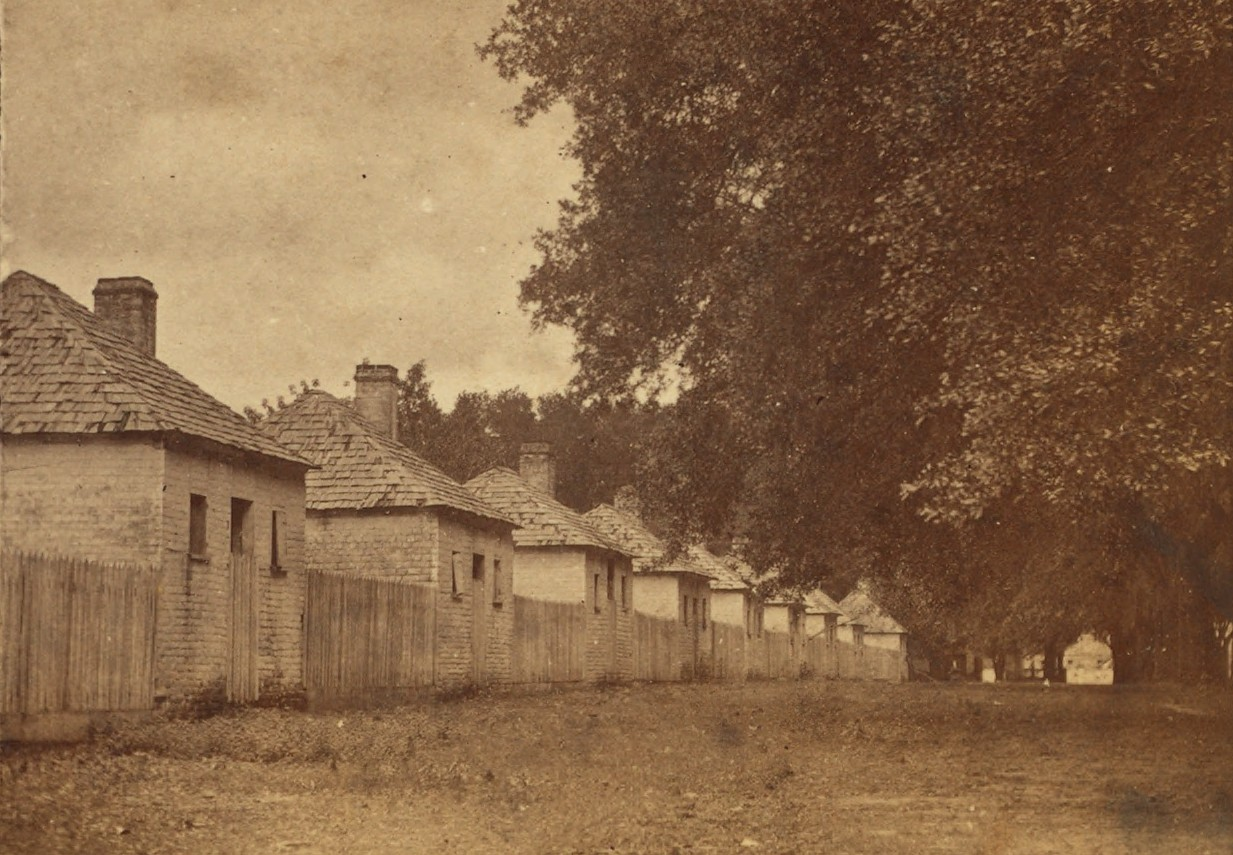
Hermitage Slave Quarters (Savannah, Georgia)

The historian Ira Berlin called this forced migration of slaves the "Second Middle Passage" because it reproduced many of the same horrors as the Middle Passage (the name given to the transportation of slaves from Africa to North America). Characterizing it as the "central event" in the life of a slave between the American Revolution and the Civil War, Berlin wrote that, whether slaves were directly uprooted or lived in fear that they or their families would be involuntarily moved, "the massive deportation traumatized black people, both slave and free". Individuals lost their connection to families and clans.

In the 19th century, some proponents of slavery often defended the institution as a "necessary evil". At that time, it was feared that emancipation of black slaves would have more harmful social and economic consequences than the continuation of slavery. On April 22, 1820, Thomas Jefferson, one of the Founding Fathers of the United States, wrote in a letter to John Holmes, that with slavery,

We have the wolf by the ear, and we can neither hold him, nor safely let him go. Justice is in one scale, and self-preservation in the other.

By contrast John C. Calhoun, in a famous speech in the Senate in 1837, declared that slavery was "instead of an evil, a good – a positive good".

Historians have begun to reflect on the impact of slavery on the entire society of the Antebellum south. Thomas Sowell draws the following conclusion regarding the macroeconomic value of slavery:

In short, even though some individual slaveowners grew rich and some family fortunes were founded on the exploitation of slaves, that is very different from saying that the whole society, or even its non-slave population as a whole, was more economically advanced than it would have been in the absence of slavery. What this means is that, whether employed as domestic servants or producing crops or other goods, millions suffered exploitation and dehumanization for no higher purpose than the ... aggrandizement of slaveowners.

=== Impact of Southern slavery on U.S foreign policy ===
Southern slaveholding interests significantly shaped U.S. foreign policy from the nation's founding through the Civil War. During the early republic, a "slaveholding oligarchy" controlled the country for their own benefit, dominating government and politics through mechanisms like the Three-Fifths Compromise and control of the emerging party system. Southern planter elites functioned as sophisticated global market players who championed the expansion of African slave labor beyond American borders. Slaveholders sought to use federal power to promote their interests, creating what scholars term a "foreign policy of slavery" that became essential for the entire nation. Rather than simply expanding territory, U.S. military expansion was specifically aimed at protecting and strengthening the institution of slavery globally. The ideological commitment to slavery left a deep imprint on the strategic culture of American foreign policy, influencing its intellectual architecture well beyond the antebellum period. Slavery significantly influenced U.S. foreign policy from the American Revolution to the Civil War, complicating diplomatic efforts with Britain and shaping American reactions to international events. The relationship between slavery and foreign relations was multidirectional, with varied results for American leaders and their goals.

=== Nullification crisis, political representation, and rising sectionalism ===
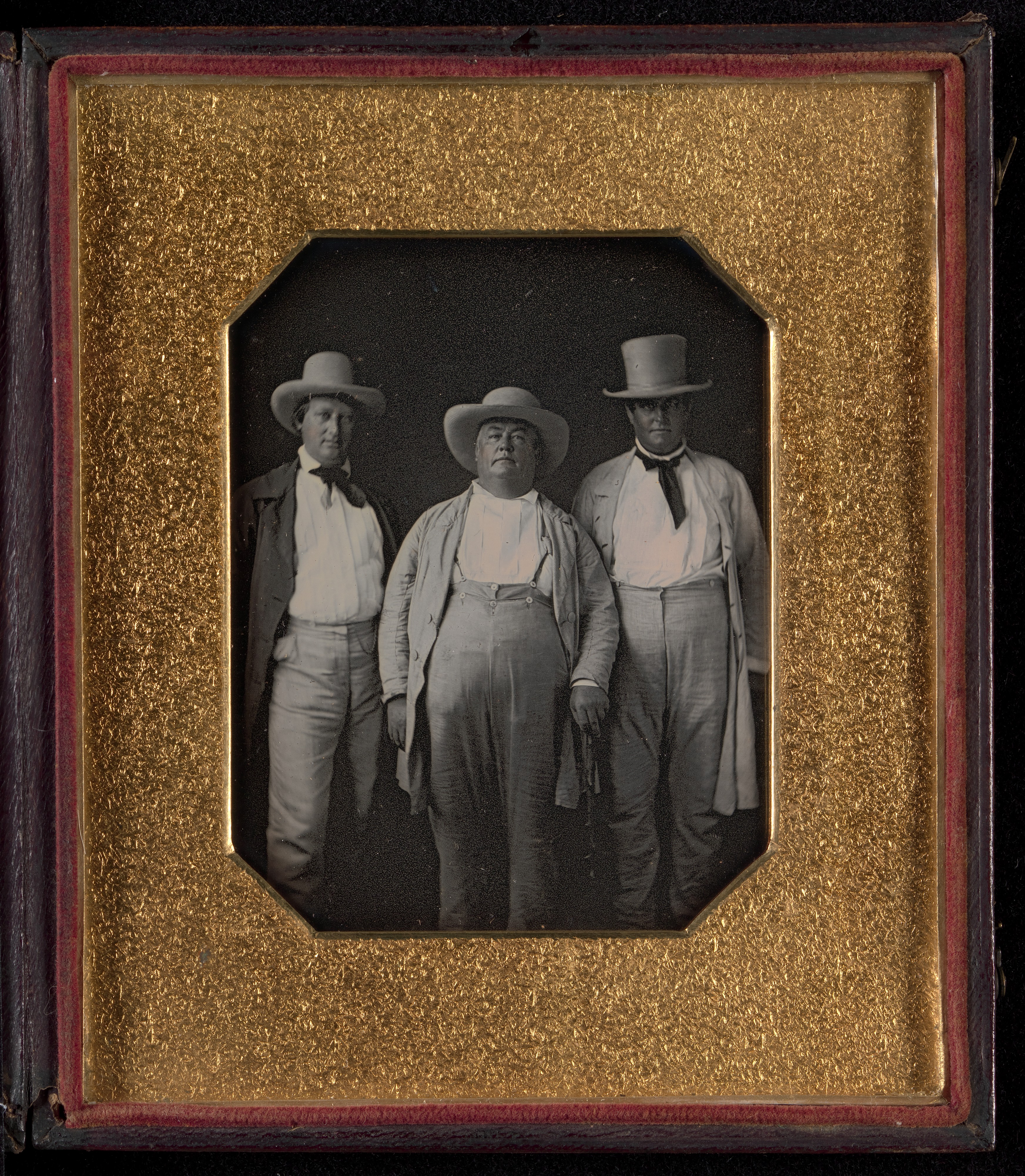
A photo of three unknown men representing the Southern planter class that promoted slavery, expanded westward, and decried federal attempts to control slavery's expansion or to implement taxes.

Although slavery had yet to become the most prominent political issue, states' rights would surface periodically in the early antebellum period, especially within the South. The election of Federalist member John Adams in the 1796 presidential election came in tandem with escalating tensions with France. In 1798, the XYZ Affair brought these tensions to the fore, and Adams became concerned about French power in America, fearing internal sabotage and malcontent that could be brought on by French agents. In response to these developments and to repeated attacks on Adams and the Federalists by Democratic-Republican publishers, Congress enacted the Alien and Sedition Acts. Enforcement of the acts resulted in the jailing of "seditious" Democratic-Republican editors throughout the North and South, and prompted the adoption of the Kentucky and Virginia Resolutions of 1798 (authored by Thomas Jefferson and James Madison), by the legislatures of those states.

Thirty years later, during the Nullification Crisis, the "Principles of '98" embodied in these resolutions were cited by leaders in South Carolina as a justification for state legislatures' asserting the power to nullify, or prevent the local application of, acts of the federal Congress that they deemed unconstitutional. The Nullification Crisis arose as a result of the Tariff of 1828, a set of high taxes on imports of manufactures, enacted by Congress as a protectionist measure to foster the development of domestic industry, primarily in the North. In 1832, the legislature of South Carolina nullified the entire "Tariff of Abominations", as the Tariff of 1828 was known in the South, prompting a stand-off between the state and federal government. On May 1, 1833, President Andrew Jackson wrote, "the tariff was only a pretext, and disunion and southern confederacy the real object. The next pretext will be the negro, or slavery question." Although the crisis was resolved through a combination of the actions of the president, Congressional reduction of the tariff, and the Force Bill, it had lasting importance for the later development of secessionist thought. An additional factor that led to Southern sectionalism was the proliferation of cultural and literary magazines such as the Southern Literary Messenger and DeBow's Review.

=== Sectional parity and issue of slavery in new territories ===
An animation showing the free/slave status of U.S. states and territories, 1789–1861

The primary issue feeding sectionalism was slavery, and especially the issue of whether to permit slavery in western territories seeking admission to the Union as states. In the early 19th century, as the cotton boom took hold, slavery became more economically viable on a large scale, and more Northerners began to perceive it as an economic threat, even if they remained indifferent to its moral dimension. While relatively few Northerners favored outright abolition, many more opposed the expansion of slavery to new territories, as in their view the availability of slaves lowered wages for free labor.

At the same time, Southerners increasingly perceived the economic and population growth of the North as threatening to their interests. For several decades after the Union was formed, as new states were admitted, North and South were able to finesse their sectional differences and maintain political balance by agreeing to admit "slave" and "free" states in equal numbers. By means of this compromise approach, the balance of power in the Senate could be extended indefinitely. The House of Representatives, however, was a different matter. As the North industrialized and its population grew, aided by a major influx of European immigrants, the Northern majority in the House of Representatives also grew, making Southern political leaders increasingly uncomfortable. Southerners became concerned that they would soon find themselves at the mercy of a federal government in which they no longer had sufficient representation to protect their interests. By the late 1840s, Senator Jefferson Davis from Mississippi stated that the new Northern majority in the Congress would make the government of the United States "an engine of Northern aggrandizement" and that Northern leaders had an agenda to "promote the industry of the United States at the expense of the people of the South."

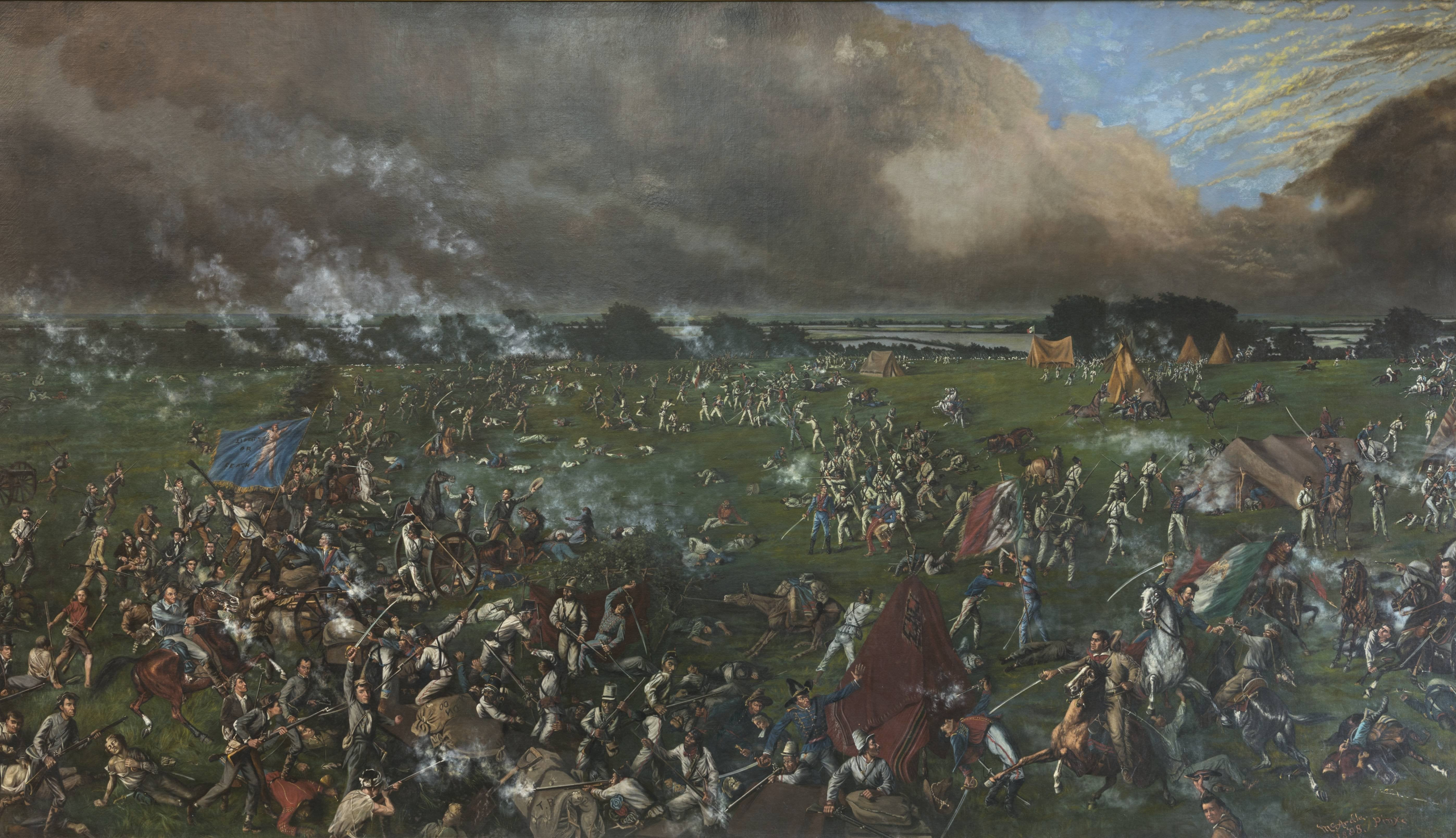
The Battle of San Jacinto, leading eventually to Amemrican annexation of Texas the Mexican–American War and the reinforcement of slavery in Texas.

After the Mexican–American War, many Northerners became alarmed by new territory now being added on the Southern side of the free-slave boundary, the slavery-in-the-territories issue heated up dramatically. After a four-year sectional conflict, the Compromise of 1850 narrowly averted civil war with a complex deal in which California was admitted as a free state, including Southern California, thus preventing a separate slave territory there, while slavery was allowed in the New Mexico and Utah territories and a stronger Fugitive Slave Act of 1850 was passed, requiring all citizens to assist in recapturing runaway slaves wherever found. Four years later, the peace bought with successive compromises finally came to an end. In the Kansas–Nebraska Act, Congress left the issue of slavery to a vote in each territory, thereby provoking a breakdown of law and order as rival groups of pro- and anti-slavery immigrants competed to populate the newly settled region.

=== Election of 1860, secession, and Lincoln's response ===
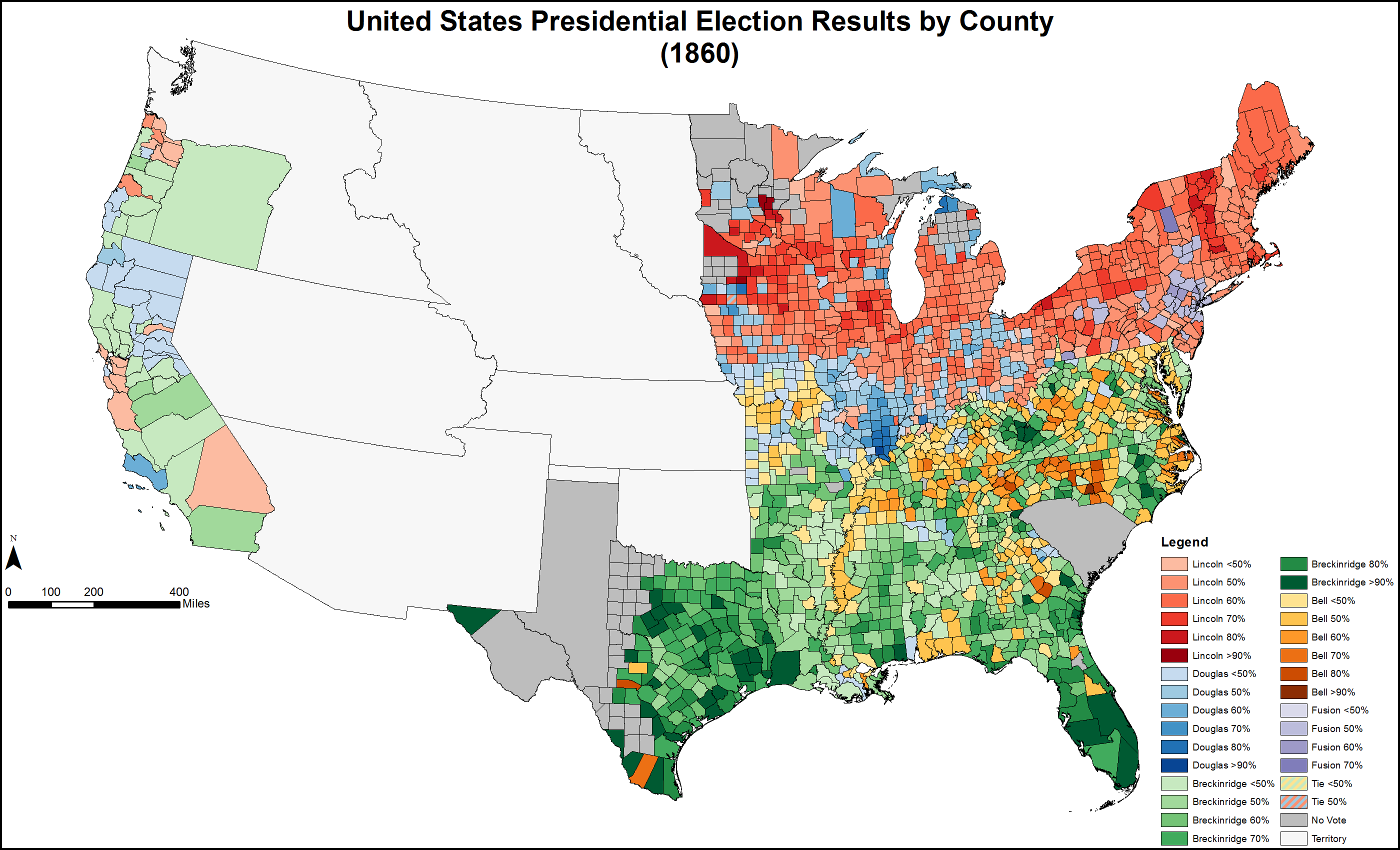
Results by county, with darker shades indicating larger percentages for the winning candidate. Red is for Lincoln (Republican), blue is for Douglas (Northern Democratic), green is for Breckinridge (Southern Democratic), yellow is for Bell (Constitutional Union), and purple is for "Fusion" (Non-Republican/Democratic Fusion). South Carolina did not permit any popular vote for the election.

For many Southerners, the last straws were the raid on Harper's Ferry in 1859 by abolitionist John Brown, immediately followed by a Northern Republican victory in the presidential election of 1860. Notably, South Carolina had no popular vote. Republican Abraham Lincoln was elected president in a hotly contested four way race. In Southern States local leaders ensured that Lincoln was blocked from the ballot, instead most voters made a choice between hard line Breckingridge and Bell who advocated preservation of the union, slavery was the prevailing subject of the election. Beckingbridge argued that Southern independence was desirable to protect slavery if Lincoln was elected; Bell argued that the constitution protected slavery so that secession was unnecessary.

Members of the South Carolina legislature had previously sworn to secede from the Union if Lincoln was elected, and the state declared its secession on December 20, 1860. South Carolina's declaration of secession mentioned slavery 17 times and justifying South Carolina's independence in lieu of looming property rights violations (the right to own slaves) by the national government. In January and February, six other cotton states of the Deep South followed suit: Mississippi, Florida, Alabama, Georgia, Louisiana, and Texas. The other eight slave states postponed a decision, but the seven formed a new government in Montgomery, Alabama, in February: the Confederate States of America. Throughout the South, Confederates seized federal arsenals and forts, without resistance, and forced the surrender of all U.S. forces in Texas. The sitting president, James Buchanan, believed he had no constitutional power to act, and in the four months between Lincoln's election and his inauguration, the South strengthened its military position.

In Washington, proposals for compromise and reunion went nowhere, as the Confederates demanded total independence. When Lincoln dispatched a supply ship to federal-held Fort Sumter, in South Carolina, the Confederate government ordered an attack on the fort, which surrendered on April 13. President Lincoln called upon the states to supply 75,000 troops to serve for ninety days to recover federal property, and, forced to choose sides, Virginia, Arkansas, Tennessee, and North Carolina promptly voted to secede. Kentucky declared its neutrality.

== Confederate States 1861-1865 ==
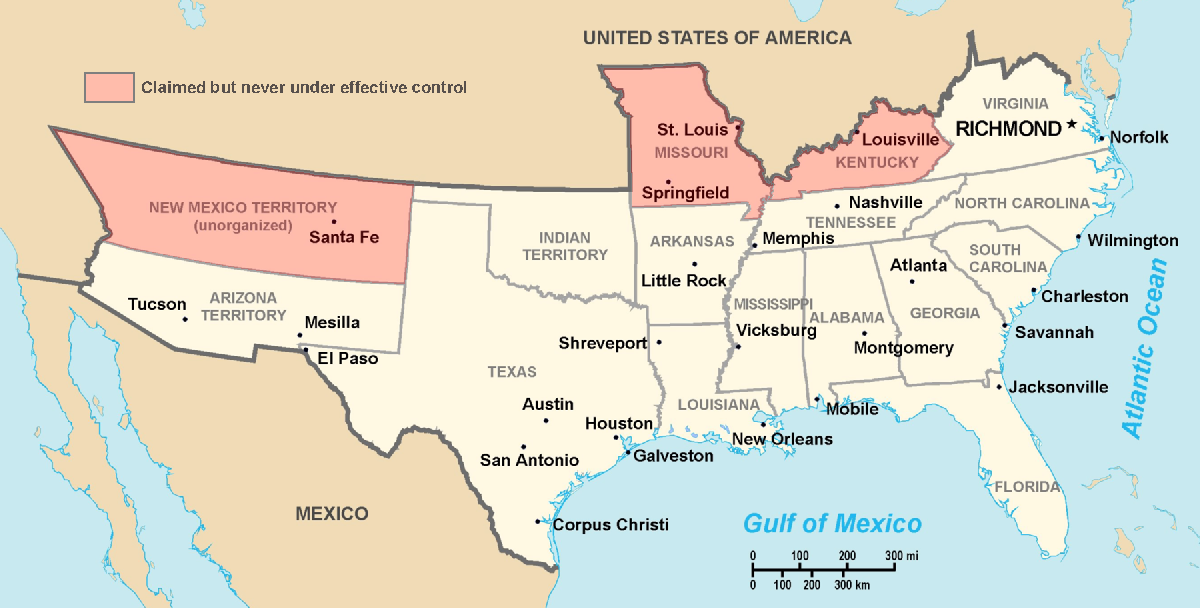
The Confederate States in North America, (1861-1865), and its claimed territory which was never under its effective control.

Secession Statement of the State of South Carolina from the United States, December 1860, slavery is mentioned a total of 18 times.

The seceded states, joined as the Confederate States of America, sought to consolidate control over border southern states including Kentucky and Missouri. The Confederate government also envisioned westward expansion through its Arizona territory, one goal being to extend the CSA to the Pacific Coast. After secession, no compromise was possible, because the Confederacy insisted on its independence and the Lincoln Administration refused to meet with President Davis's commissioners. Lincoln ordered that a Navy fleet of warships and troop transports be sent to Charleston Harbor to reinforce and resupply Fort Sumter. Just before the fleet was about to enter the harbor, Confederates unleashed a massive bombardment and forced the Federal garrison holed up in the fort to surrender. The incident prompted President Lincoln to proclaim that United States forces had been attacked and called for mobilizations to restore Government control in the seceded states. In response the Confederate military strategy was to hold its territory together, gain worldwide recognition, and inflict so much punishment on invaders that the Northerners would tire of an expensive war and negotiate a peace treaty that would recognize the independence of the CSA.

The Confederate government was formed to explicitly protect the institution of slavery as stated by Vice President Alexander H. Stephens and thus enshrined slavery in its constitution. However, the Confederate political system proved fatally flawed. The strength of the Confederacy included an unusually strong officer corps—about a third of the officers of the U.S. Army had resigned and joined. But the political leadership was not very effective. The Confederacy decided not to have political parties, believing they were divisive and would weaken the war effort. Historians agree that this lack of parties actually weakened the political system. Instead of having a viable alternative to the current system, people could only "grumble and complain and lose faith." President Jefferson Davis, despite his credentials as a former Army officer, senator, and Secretary of War, proved much less effective than Abraham Lincoln. A classic interpretation holds that the Confederacy "died of states' rights," as governors of Texas, Georgia, and North Carolina refused Richmond's requests for troops.

Both sides wanted the border southern states, with the Confederacy controlling half of Kentucky and the southern portion of Missouri early in the war, but the Union military forces took control of all of them in 1861–1862. Union victories in western Virginia allowed a Unionist government based in Wheeling to take control of western Virginia and, with Washington's approval, create the new state of West Virginia. The Confederacy did recruit troops in the border states, but the enormous advantage of controlling them went to the Union.

White Southerners were far from unified in supporting the Confederate cause, particularly in the upper South. Virginia's state legislature initially voted by 2/3 to remain in the United States; even after Fort Sumter, 36% of delegates still voted against secession. North Carolina voted by popular referendum to remain in the Union, though when the state later seceded anyway, the governor refused to permit a second referendum. Tennessee had strong unionist sentiment in its eastern Appalachian counties.

As many as 100,000 men living in Confederate states served in the Union Army or pro-Union guerrilla groups. Every state except South Carolina had an organized Unionist army. In Mississippi, Jones County broke away from the Confederacy entirely and freed its slaves, becoming the "Free State of Jones." In Texas, Confederate officials harassed and murdered Unionists and Germans; in Cooke County alone, 150 suspected Unionists were arrested, with 25 lynched without trial and 40 more hanged after summary trials.

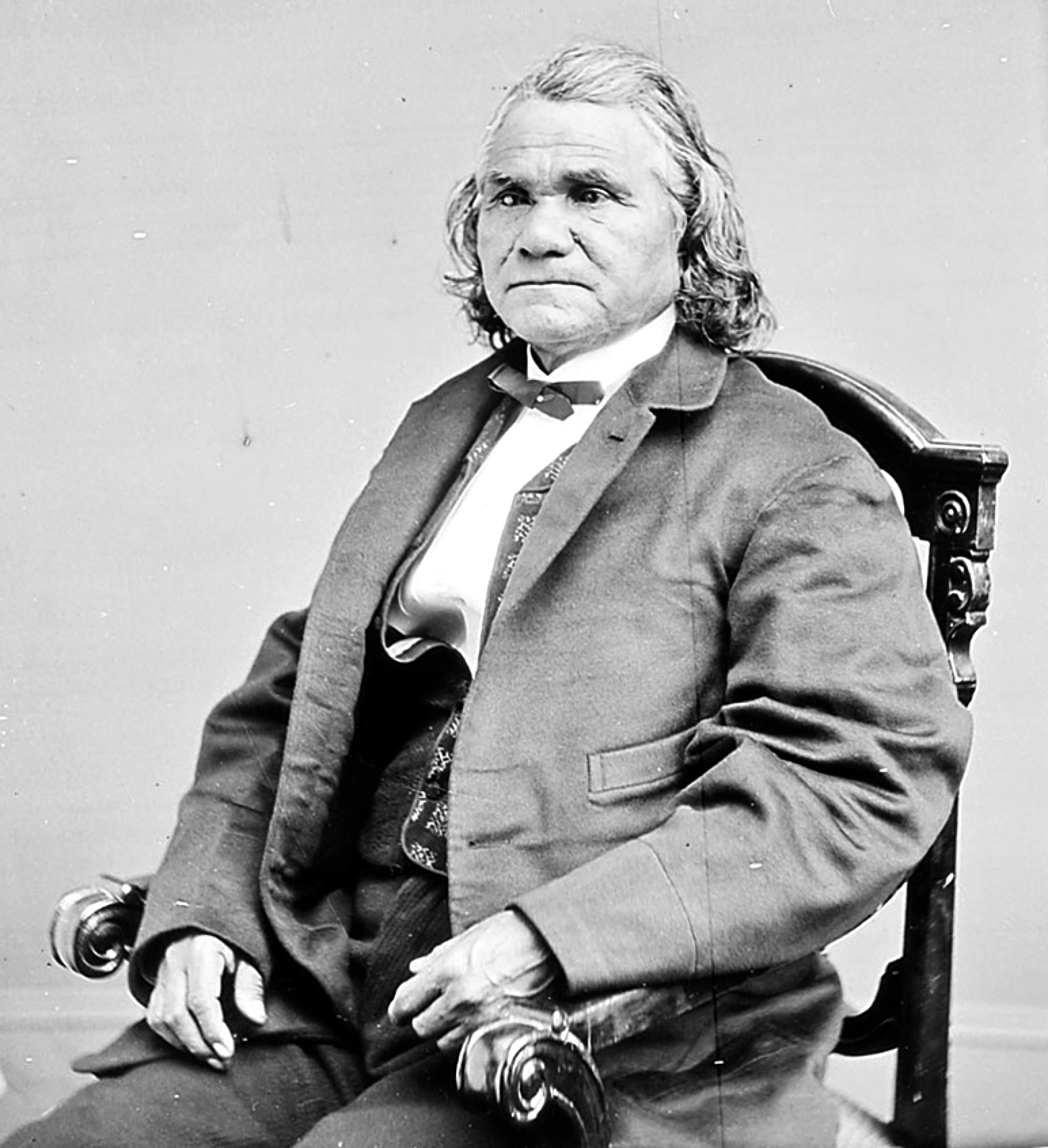
Confederate Brigadier General Stand Watie, Cherokee survivor of Indian removal and final Confederate general to surrender to the Union.

Even among Native Americans, loyalties were divided. Confederate supporters in the trans-Mississippi west claimed portions of the Indian Territory after the United States evacuated federal forts. Over half of American Indian troops from Indian Territory supported the Confederacy, as they practiced slavery and feared their lands would be seized by the Union. The Cherokee Nation aligned with the Confederacy, and after 1863, tribal governments sent representatives to the Confederate Congress.

=== Collapse of slavery ===
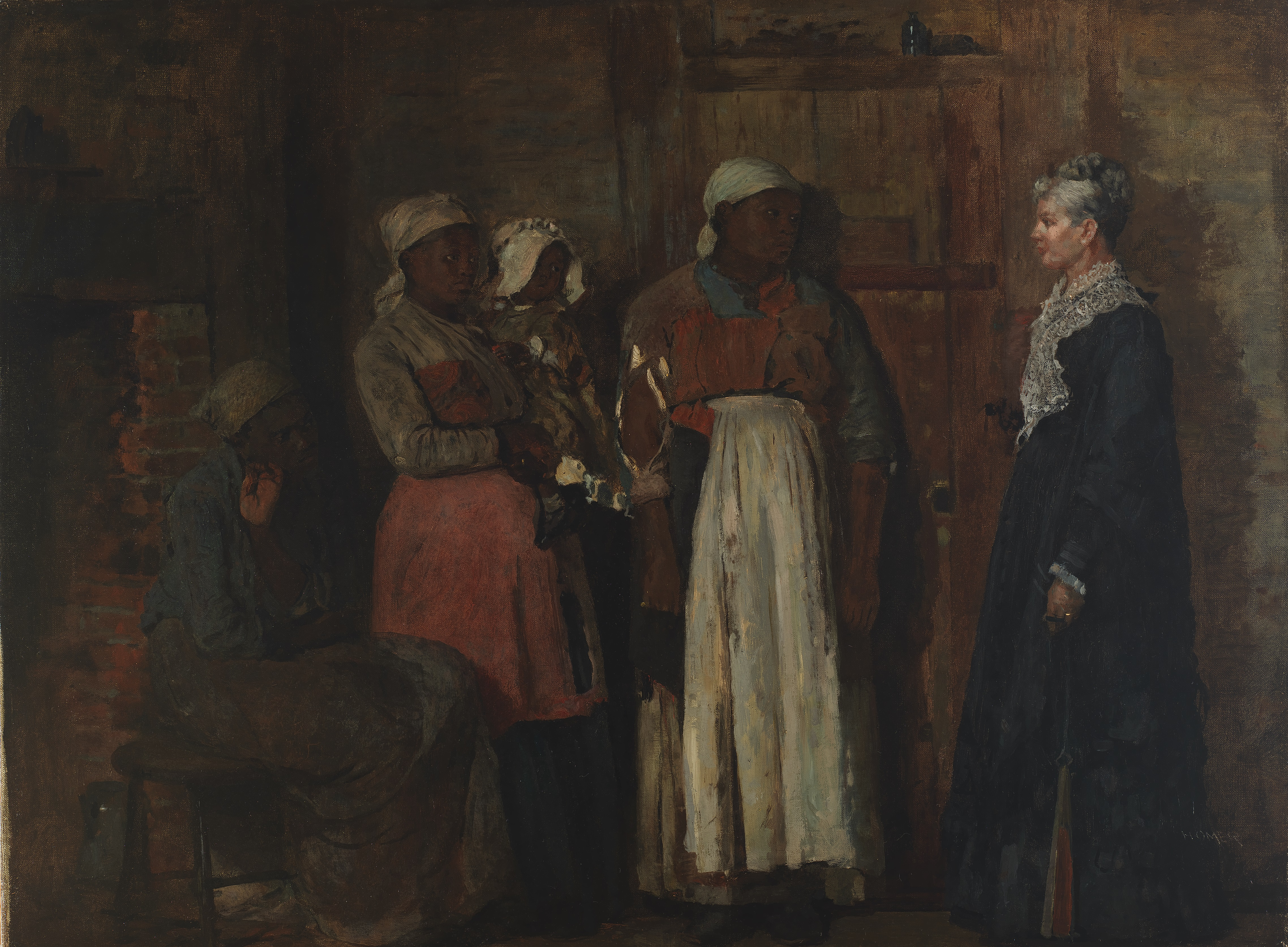
"A Visit from the Old Mistress", depicts a tense meeting between a group of newly freed slaves and their former slaveholder.

Across the South, widespread rumors alarmed whites by predicting the slaves were planning some sort of insurrection. Patrols were stepped up. The slaves did become increasingly independent, and resistant to punishment, but historians agree there were no insurrections. In the invaded areas, insubordination was more the norm than was loyalty to the old master; Bell Wiley says, "It was not disloyalty, but the lure of freedom." Many slaves became spies for the North, and large numbers ran away to federal lines.

By 1862, most Northern leaders realized that the mainstay of Southern secession, slavery, had to be attacked head-on. The Emancipation Proclamation was an executive order issued by Lincoln on January 1, 1863. In a single stroke it changed the legal status of 3 million slaves in designated areas of the Confederacy from "slave" to "free". It had the practical effect that as soon as a slave escaped the control of the Confederate government, by running away or through advances of federal troops, the slave became legally and actually free. By June 1865, the Union Army controlled all of the Confederacy and liberated all of the designated slaves. The owners were never compensated. Nor were the slaves themselves.

Many of the freedmen remained on the same plantation, others crowded into refugee camps operated by the Freedmen's Bureau. The Bureau provided food, housing, clothing, medical care, church services, some schooling, legal support, and arranged for labor contracts. Conditions were harsh for former slaves. Disease and sickness had devastating effects on emancipated slaves, since they often lacked basic necessities to survive. Many freed slaves died once they secured refuge behind Union camps.

=== Economic and infrastructure collapse ===
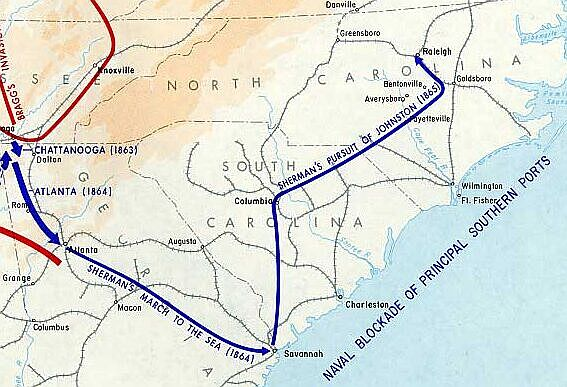
Sherman's March through Georgia and the Carolinas

The Union naval blockade, starting in May 1861, reduced exports by 95%; only small, fast blockade runners—mostly owned and operated by British interests—could get through. The South's vast cotton crops became nearly worthless. In 1861 the rebels assumed that "King Cotton" was so powerful that the threat of losing their supplies would induce Britain and France to enter the war as allies. Confederate leaders were ignorant of European conditions; Britain depended on the Union for its food supply, and would not benefit from an extremely expensive major war with the U.S.

By 1864, the top Union generals Ulysses S. Grant and William T. Sherman realized the weakest point of the Confederate armies was the decrepitude of the southern infrastructure. Sherman focused on the trust the rebels had in their Confederacy as a living nation, predicting his raid would "demonstrate the vulnerability of the South, and make its inhabitants feel that war and individual ruin are synonymous terms." Sherman's "March to the Sea" from Atlanta to Savannah in the fall of 1864 burned and ruined industrial, commercial, transportation and agricultural infrastructure across 15% of Georgia. More telling than the physical destruction was the psychological impact—the bitter realization among civilians and soldiers throughout the remaining Confederacy that if they persisted, sooner or later their homes and communities would receive the same treatment.

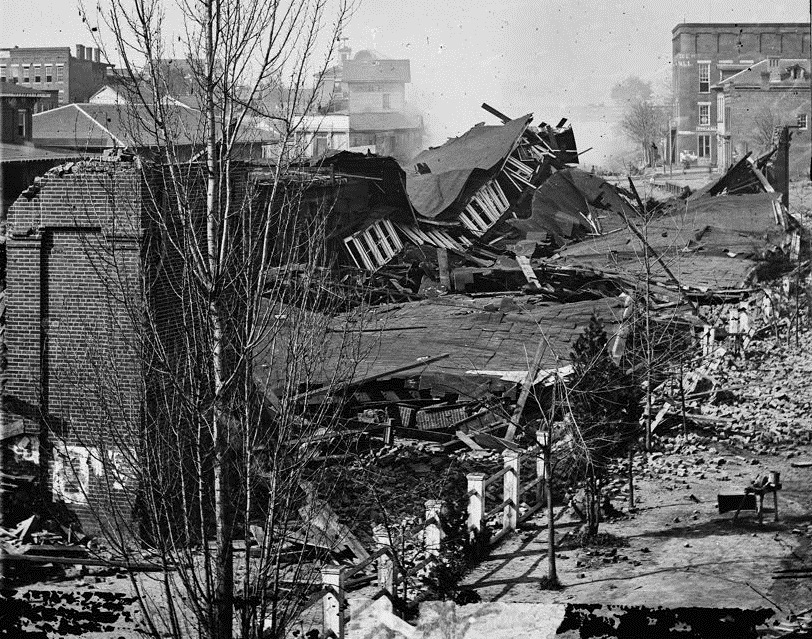
Atlanta first union station in ruins 1864

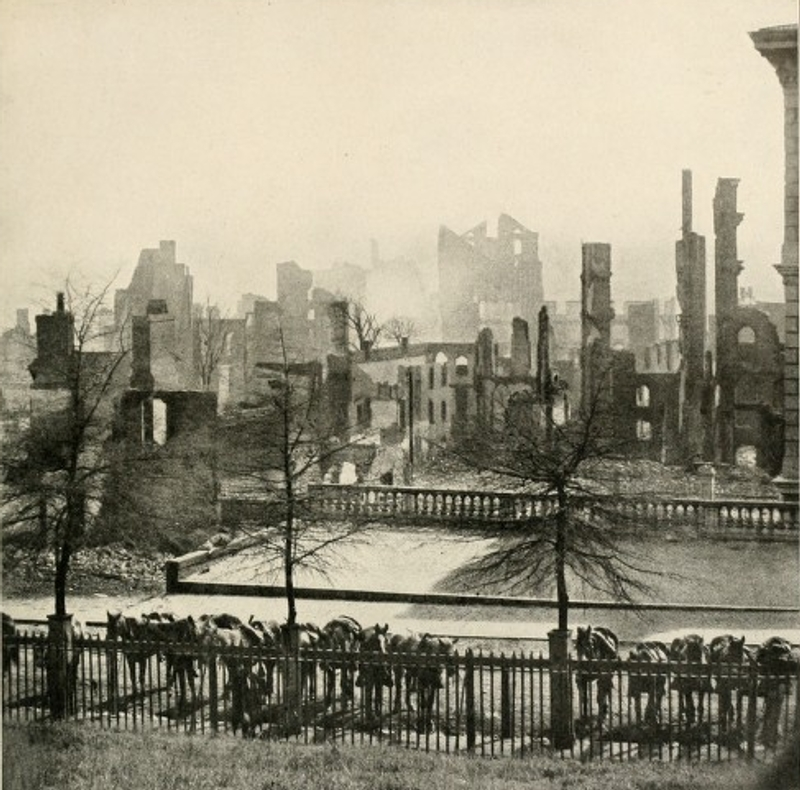
Ruins of Richmond after the Siege of Petersburg April 1865

The material devastation was staggering. Confederate losses included 94,000 killed in battle, 164,000 who died of disease, and 26,000 who died in Union prisons. The number of civilian deaths was highest among refugees and former slaves.

The economic calamity was complete. Except for land, most assets and investments had vanished with slavery, but debts were left behind. Transportation systems were paralyzed, with most railroad companies bankrupt. The rebuilding would take years and require outside investment because the devastation was so thorough.

The war was effectively over with the surrender at Appomattox Court House in April 1865. There were no trials for insurgency or treason and only one war crimes trial.

== Reconstruction (1865–1877) ==
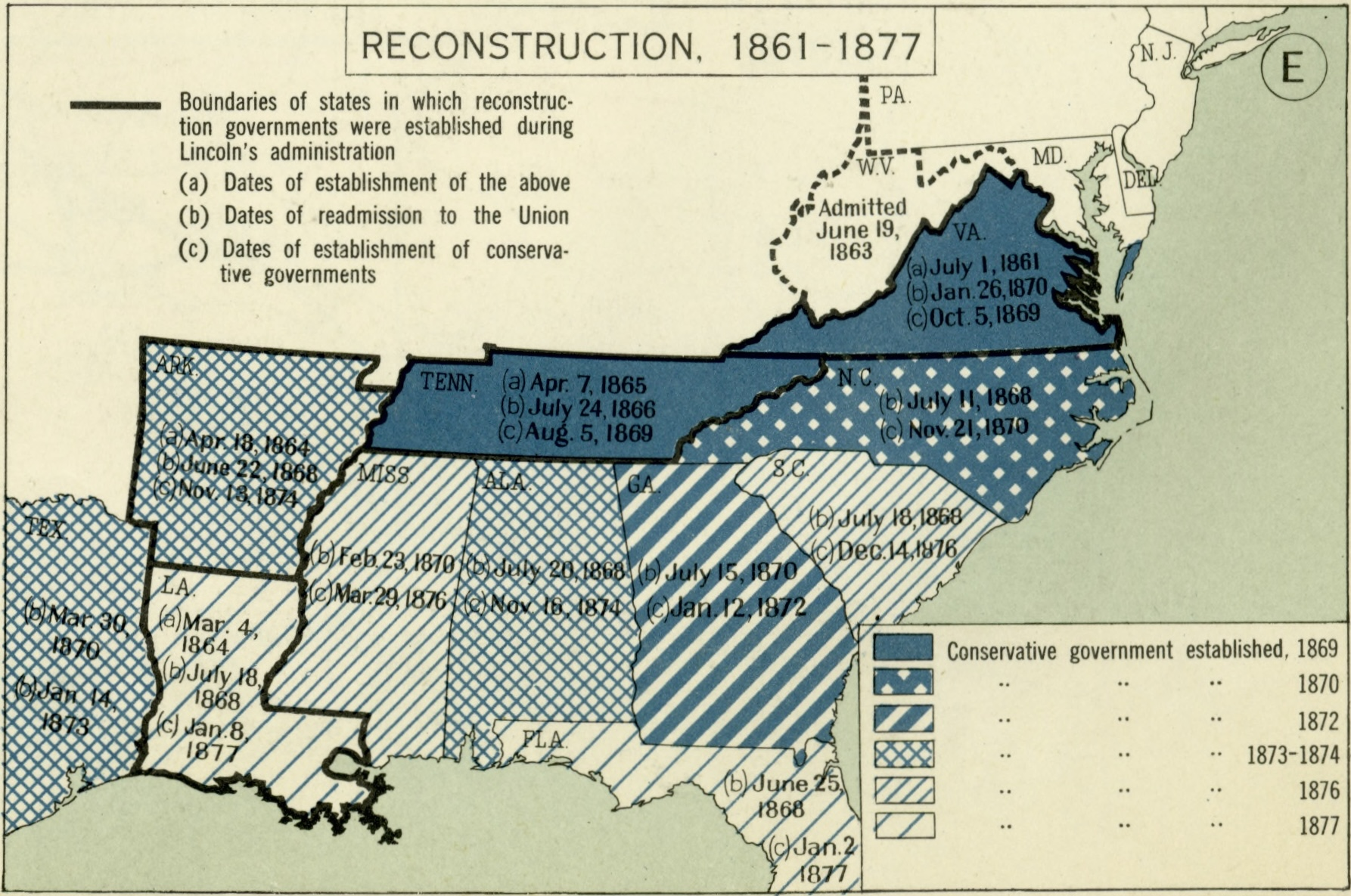
Map of Reconstruction in the United States, 1861–1877.

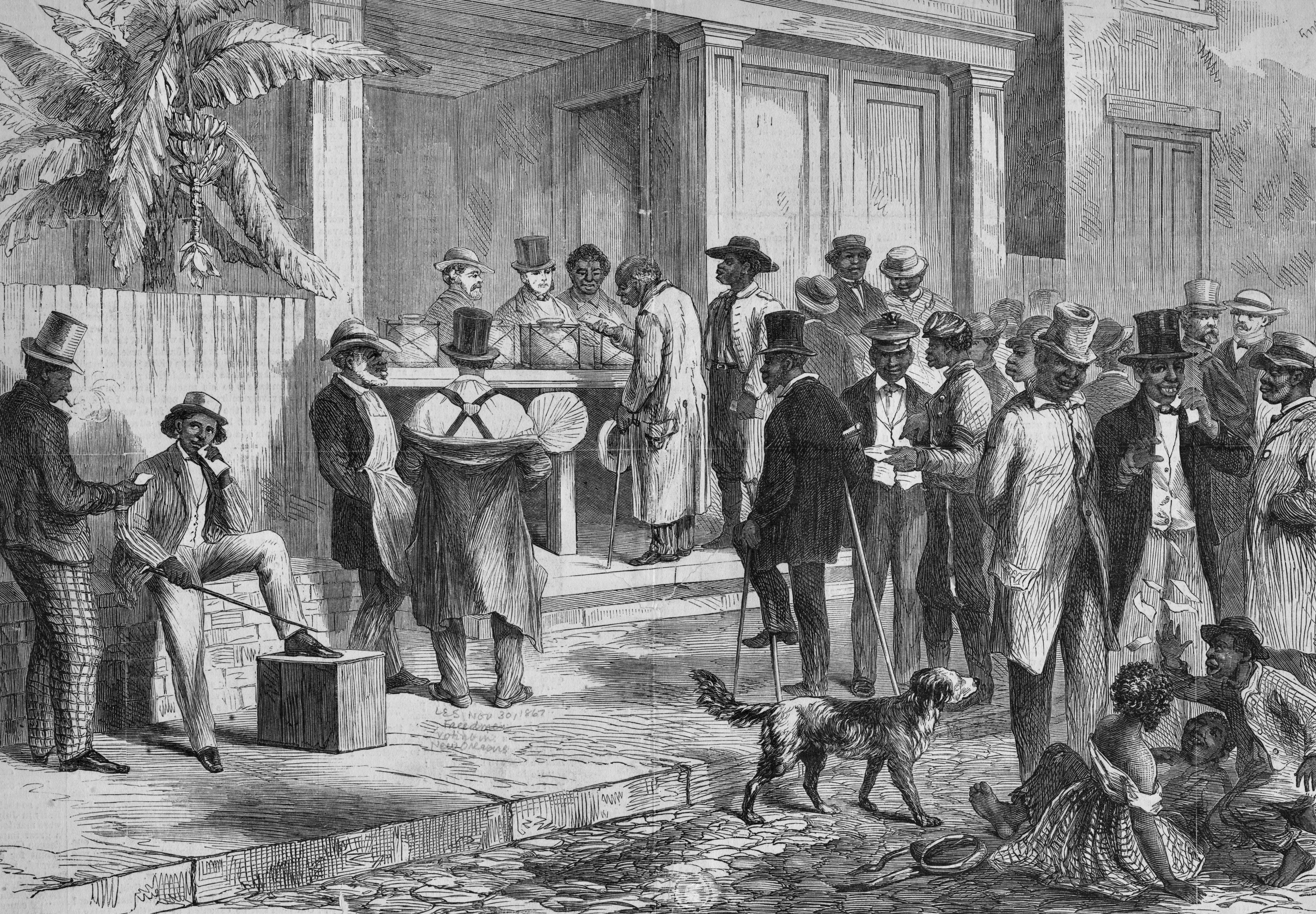
Freedmen Voting in New Orleans (1867)

Reconstruction was the process by which the states returned to full status. It took place in four stages, which varied by state. Tennessee and the border states were not affected. First came the governments appointed by President Andrew Johnson that lasted 1865–1866. The Freedmen's Bureau was active, helping refugees, setting up employment contracts for Freedmen, and setting up courts and schools for the freedmen. Second came rule by the U.S. Army, which held elections that included all freedmen and also excluded over 10,000 former Confederate leaders on account of their prior war on the United States government. Third was "Radical Reconstruction" or "Black Reconstruction" in which a Republican coalition governed the state, comprising a coalition of freedmen, scalawags (native Southern whites) and carpetbaggers (migrants from the North). Violent terrorism by the Ku Klux Klan and related groups was suppressed by President Ulysses S. Grant and the vigorous use of federal courts and soldiers. The Reconstruction governments spent large sums on railroad subsidies and schools, but quadrupled taxes and set off a tax revolt. Stage four was reached by 1876 by a coalition of white supremacists and former confederates, called "Redeemers", had won political control of all the states except South Carolina, Florida and Louisiana. The disputed presidential election of 1876 hinged on those three violently contested states. The outcome was the Compromise of 1877, whereby the Republican Rutherford Hayes became president and all federal troops were withdrawn from the South, leading to the immediate collapse of the last Republican state governments in the 19th century.

Slavery ended and the large slave-based plantations were mostly subdivided into tenant or sharecropper farms of 20–40 acres (8.1–16.2 ha). Sharecropping, along with tenant farming, became a dominant form in the cotton South from the 1870s to the 1950s, among both blacks and whites. Sharecropping was a way for very poor farmers to earn a living from land owned by someone else. The landowner provided land, housing, tools and seed, and perhaps a mule, and a local merchant provided food and supplies on credit. At harvest time the sharecropper received a share of the crop (from one-third to one-half, with the landowner taking the rest). The cropper used his share to pay off his debt to the merchant. The system started with blacks when large plantations were subdivided. By the 1880s white farmers also became sharecroppers. The system was distinct from that of the tenant farmer, who rented the land, provided his own tools and mule, and received half the crop. Landowners provided more supervision to sharecroppers, and less or none to tenant farmers.

The building of a new, modern rail system was widely seen as essential to the economic recovery of the South, and modernizers invested in a "Gospel of Prosperity". Northern money financed the rebuilding and dramatic expansion of railroads throughout the South; they were modernized in terms of rail gauge, equipment and standards of service. The Panic of 1873 ended the expansion everywhere in the United States, leaving many Southern lines bankrupt or barely able to pay the interest on their bonds. The Southern network still expanded from 11,000 miles (18,000 km) in 1870 to 29,000 miles (47,000 km) in 1890. Railroads helped create a mechanically skilled group of craftsmen and broke the isolation of much of the region. Passengers were few, however, and apart from hauling the cotton crop when it was harvested, there was little freight traffic. The lines were owned and directed overwhelmingly by Northerners, who often had to pay heavy bribes to corrupt politicians for needed legislation.

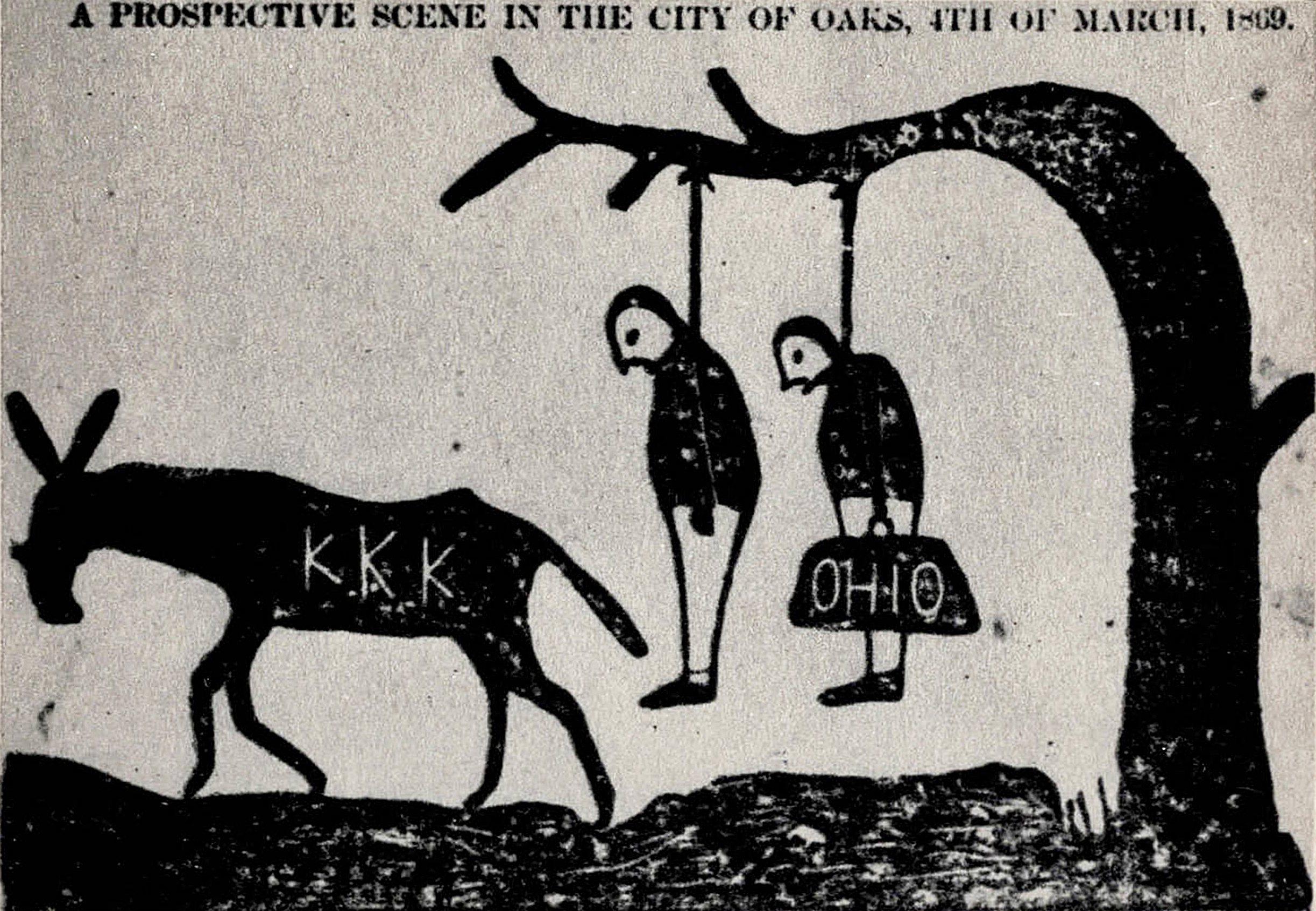
Cartoon threatening that the KKK will lynch white Scalawags (left) and Carpetbaggers (right) on March 4, 1869. Image is of Arad Simon Lakin ("Ohio") and Noah B. Cloud hanging from the tree.

Reconstruction offended former confederates who found themselves without the ability to vote due to the Ironclad Oath Anti Confederate disenfranchisement sometimes excluded 10–20% of white voters in certain states and smaller groups in others. Most Ex Confederate restrictions were lifted by 1870 though all were completely repealed in 1884.

Reconstruction was also a time when many African Americans and some poor whites began to secure these same rights for the first time. With the passage of the 13th Amendment to the Constitution (which outlawed slavery), the 14th Amendment (which granted full U.S. citizenship to African Americans) and the 15th Amendment (which extended the right to vote to black males), African Americans in the South began to enjoy more rights than they had ever had in the past.

A reaction to the defeat and changes in society began immediately, with terrorist groups such as the Ku Klux Klan arising in 1866 as the first line of insurgents. They attacked and killed both freedmen and their white allies. By the 1870s, more organized paramilitary groups, such as the White League and Red Shirts, took part in turning Republicans out of office and barring or intimidating black people from voting. A standard example of white supremacist violence in the period is the Camilla massacre where twelve African Americans were murdered by a mob for attempting to attend a Republican political rally. The brutality caused Congress to temporarily revoke Georgia's statehood.

Mississippi Representative Wiley P. Harris, a Democrat, explained the white supremacist perspective in 1875:

If any two hundred Southern men backed by a Federal administration should go to Indianapolis, turn out the Indiana people, take possession of all the seats of power, honor, and profit, denounce the people at large as assassins and barbarians, introduce corruption in all the branches of the public administration, make government a curse instead of a blessing, league with the most ignorant class of society to make war on the enlightened, intelligent, and virtuous, what kind of social relations would such a state of things beget.

== Jim Crow South: segregation and economic transformation (1877–1933) ==
The Southern United States as defined by the Census Bureau

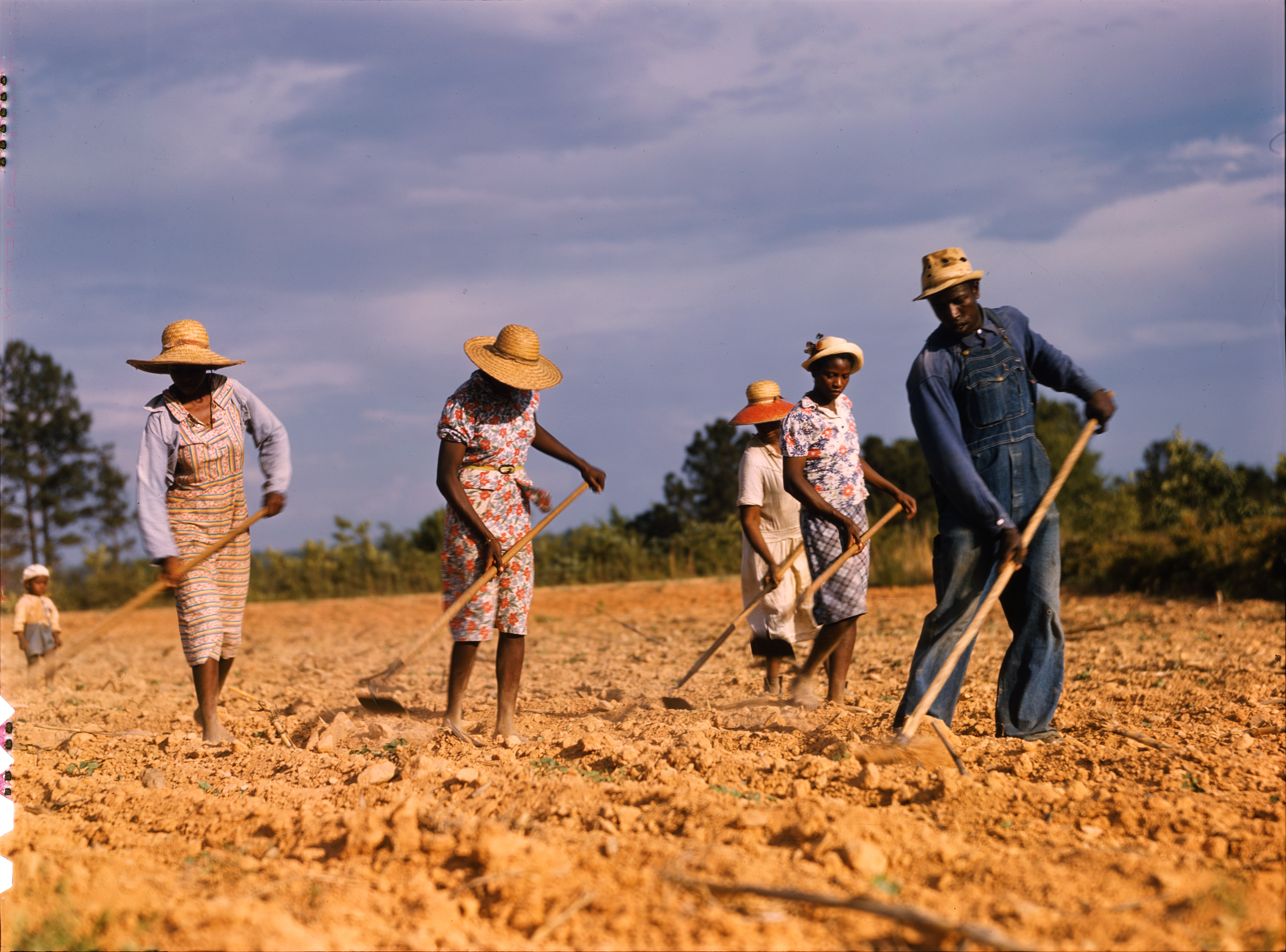
Sharecroppers in Georgia, 1941

The South remained heavily rural until World War II. After the end of Reconstruction in 1877, when federal troops were withdrawn from the South, white-dominated state legislatures began systematically restricting the rights of African Americans. There was little cash in circulation, since most farmers operated on credit accounts from local merchants, and paid off their debts at cotton harvest time in the fall. Cotton became even more important than before, even though prices were much lower. The number of small farms proliferated over time, becoming smaller and smaller as the population grew. Many white farmers, and some black farmers, were tenant farmers who owned their work animals and tools, and rented their land. Others were day laborers or impoverished sharecroppers.

Mill towns, primarily focused on textile production or tobacco product manufacture, began opening in the Piedmont region, especially in the Carolinas. There were only a few scattered large cities in the region, with small courthouse towns serving the mostly rural population. Local politics revolved around the politicians and lawyers based at the courthouse.

=== Legal segregation and disenfranchisement ===
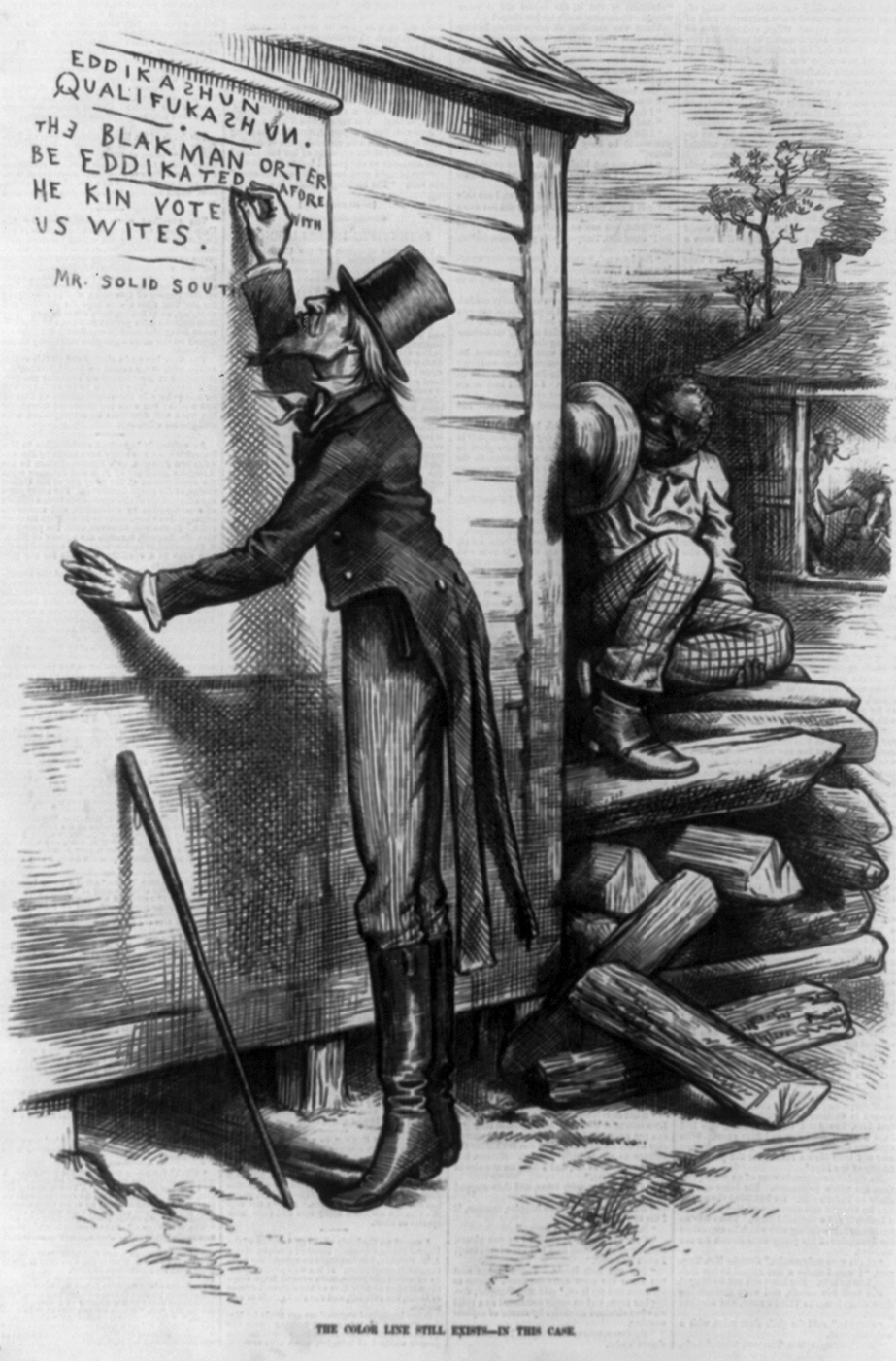
Editorial cartoon from the January 18, 1879, issue of Harper's Weekly criticizing and satirizing the use of literacy tests."

From the late 1870s Southern U.S. state legislatures passed laws requiring the separation of whites from "persons of color" in public transportation and schools. Segregation was extended to parks, cemeteries, theatres, and restaurants in an attempt to prevent any contact between Blacks and whites as equals. These became known as "Jim Crow laws," named after a racist minstrel show character. The most extreme white leader was Senator Ben Tillman of South Carolina, who proudly proclaimed in 1900, "We have done our level best [to prevent blacks from voting] ... we have scratched our heads to find out how we could eliminate the last one of them. We stuffed ballot boxes. We shot them. We are not ashamed of it."

From 1890 to 1908, ten of the eleven former Confederate states, along with Oklahoma upon statehood, passed disenfranchising constitutions or amendments that introduced voter registration barriers—such as poll taxes, residency requirements and literacy tests—that were hard for minorities to meet. Most African Americans, most Mexican Americans, and tens of thousands of poor whites were disenfranchised, losing the vote for decades. In some states, grandfather clauses temporarily exempted white illiterates from literacy tests. By 1910, only 730 black people were registered in Louisiana, less than 0.5% of eligible black men. "In 27 of the state's 60 parishes, not a single black voter was registered any longer."

The phrase "separate but equal", upheld in the 1896 Supreme Court case Plessy v. Ferguson, came to represent the notion that whites and blacks should have access to physically separate but ostensibly equal facilities. Public parks were forbidden for African Americans to enter, and theaters and restaurants were segregated. Segregated waiting rooms in bus and train stations were required, as well as water fountains, restrooms, building entrances, elevators, cemeteries, even amusement-park cashier windows.

=== Violence and resistance ===
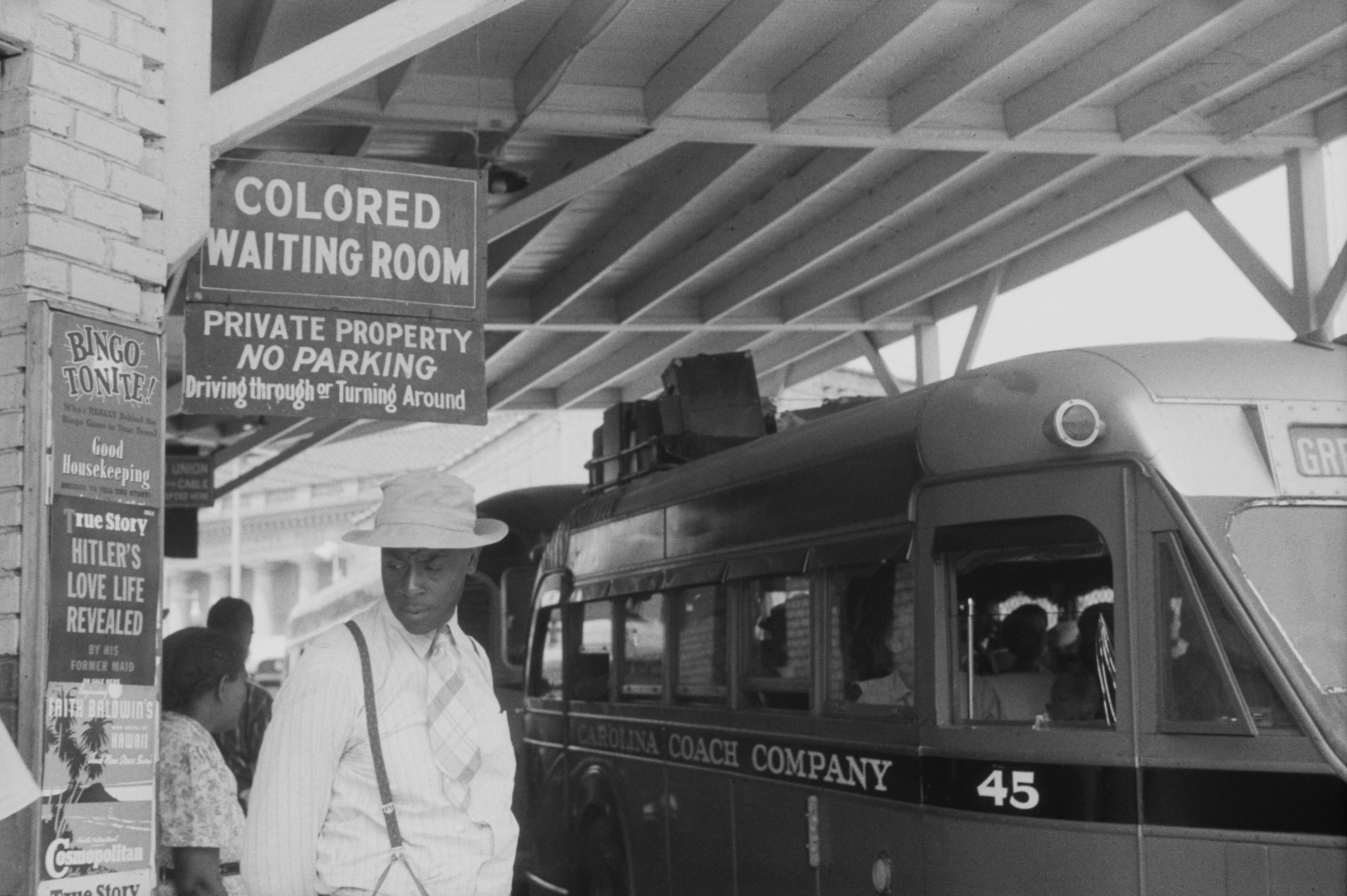
Segregated bus station in Durham, North Carolina 1940

Racial segregation and outward signs of inequality were commonplace in many rural areas and rarely challenged. Blacks who violated the color line were liable to expulsion or lynching. More than 4,400 African American men, women, and children were hanged, burned alive, shot, drowned and beaten to death by white mobs between 1877 and 1950. Between 1889 and 1922, the NAACP calculates that lynchings reached their worst level in history, with almost 3,500 people, three-fourths of them black men, murdered.

Black Americans and their allies resisted Jim Crow and Segregation, initially with the Great Migration and later organized resistance. Historian William Chafe has explored the defensive techniques developed inside the African American community to avoid the worst features of Jim Crow as expressed in the legal system, unbalanced economic power, and intimidation and psychological pressure. Known as "walking the tightrope," such efforts at bringing about change were only slightly effective before the 1920s, but did build the foundation that younger African Americans deployed in their aggressive, large-scale activism during the civil rights movement in the 1950s and 1960s.

=== Public health and social conditions ===
Compared to the North and West, the South was always a warmer climate that fostered diseases. After the Civil War it was a much more sickly region, lacking in doctors, hospitals, medicine, and all aspects of public health. Most Southerners were too poor to buy the patent medicines that were so popular elsewhere. Instead there was a heavy reliance on cheap herbal and folk remedies, especially among African Americans and Appalachians.

The Rockefeller Sanitary Commission in 1910 discovered that nearly half the farm people, white and Black, in the poorest parts of the South were infected with hookworms. The Commission helped state health departments set up eradication crusades that treated 440,000 people in 578 counties in all 11 Southern states, and ended the epidemic.

In the Southern states from the 1890s to 1930s, Jim Crow virtually dictated inferior medical care for the large, very poor African American minority. There was neglect and racism on the part of white physicians. Black physicians were too few and too poorly trained at their two small schools, Howard University and Meharry Medical College. The Tuskegee Syphilis Study, conducted from 1932 to 1972, was a highly unethical medical research project that involved 600 African American men from Macon County, Alabama. The men were told they had "bad blood" and were denied treatment for syphilis, even after the discovery of penicillin as an effective treatment. A major result of the exposure was a long-term, deep distrust of professional medicine on the part of the black community.

=== Migration and economic change ===
In the early 20th century, invasion of the boll weevil devastated cotton crops in the South, producing an additional catalyst to African Americans' decisions to leave the South. From 1910 to 1970, more than 6.5 million African Americans left the South in the Great Migration to Northern and Western cities, defecting from persistent lynching, violence, segregation, poor education, and inability to vote. Black migration transformed many Northern and Western cities, creating new cultures and music. Many African Americans, like other groups, became industrial workers; others started their own businesses within the communities. Southern whites also migrated to industrial cities like Chicago, Detroit, Oakland, and Los Angeles, where they took jobs in the booming new auto and defense industry.

Meanwhile, the first major oil well in the South was drilled at Spindletop near Beaumont, Texas, on the morning of January 10, 1901. Other oil fields were later discovered nearby in Arkansas, Oklahoma, and under the Gulf of Mexico. The resulting "Oil Boom" permanently transformed the economy of the West South Central states and produced the richest economic expansion after the Civil War.

By the 1920s, the foundations were being laid for the eventual transformation of the South. While legal segregation remained firmly in place, economic diversification, urban growth, and the Great Migration were beginning to reshape the region in ways that would eventually challenge the Jim Crow system.

== Depression and World War II 1933–1945 ==
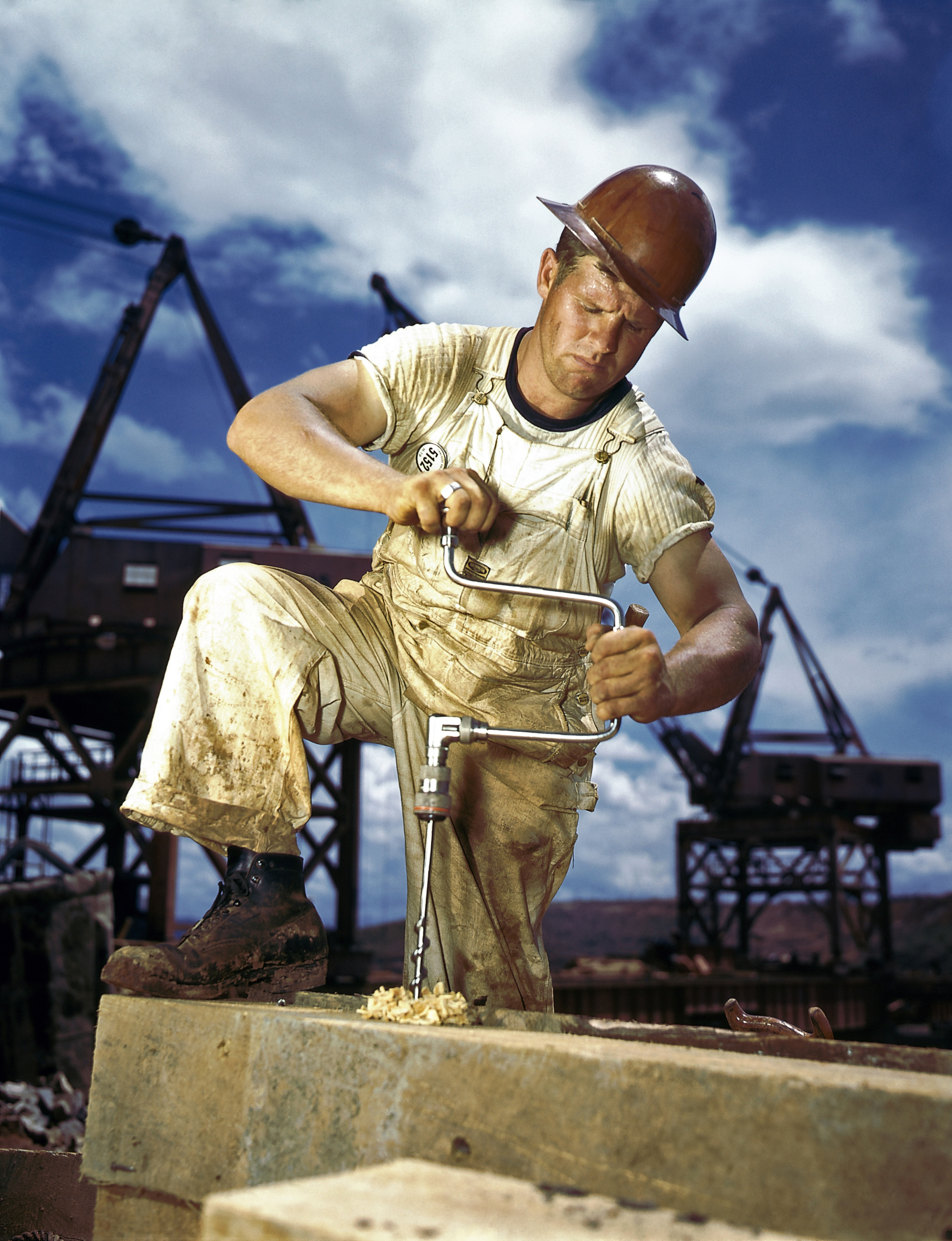
1942 photograph of carpenter at work on Douglas Dam, Tennessee (built by the Tennessee Valley Authority).

The Southern economy was dealt additional blows by the Great Depression and the Dust Bowl. After the Wall Street Crash of 1929, the economy suffered significant reversals and millions were left unemployed. Beginning in 1934 and lasting until 1939, an ecological disaster of severe wind and drought caused an exodus from Texas and Arkansas, the Oklahoma Panhandle region, and the surrounding plains, in which over 500,000 Americans were homeless, hungry and jobless. Thousands would leave the region to seek economic opportunities along the West Coast. While Franklin Roosevelt's progressive coalition desired reforms, the Roosevelt administration did not interfere with Jim Crow and other racist policies as part of a compromise with the segregationist wing of the Southern Democratic Party.

President Franklin D. Roosevelt noted the South as the "number one priority" in terms of need of assistance during the Great Depression. His administration created programs such as the Tennessee Valley Authority in 1933 to provide rural electrification and stimulate development. Locked into low-productivity agriculture, the region's growth was slowed by limited industrial development, low levels of entrepreneurship, and the lack of capital investment.

World War II marked a time of dramatic change within the South from an economic standpoint, as new industries and military bases were developed by the federal government, providing much needed capital and infrastructure in many regions. People from all parts of the US came to the South for military training and work in the region's many bases and new industries. During and after the war millions of hard-scrabble farmers, both white and black, left agriculture for other occupations and urban jobs. The United States began mobilizing for war in a major way in the spring of 1940. The warm weather of the South proved ideal for building 60% of the Army's new training camps and nearly half the new airfields. In all, 40% of spending on new military installations went to the South. Money flowed freely for the war effort, as over $4 billion went into military facilities in the South, and another $5 billion into defense plants. Major shipyards were built in Virginia, and Charleston, SC, and along the Gulf Coast.

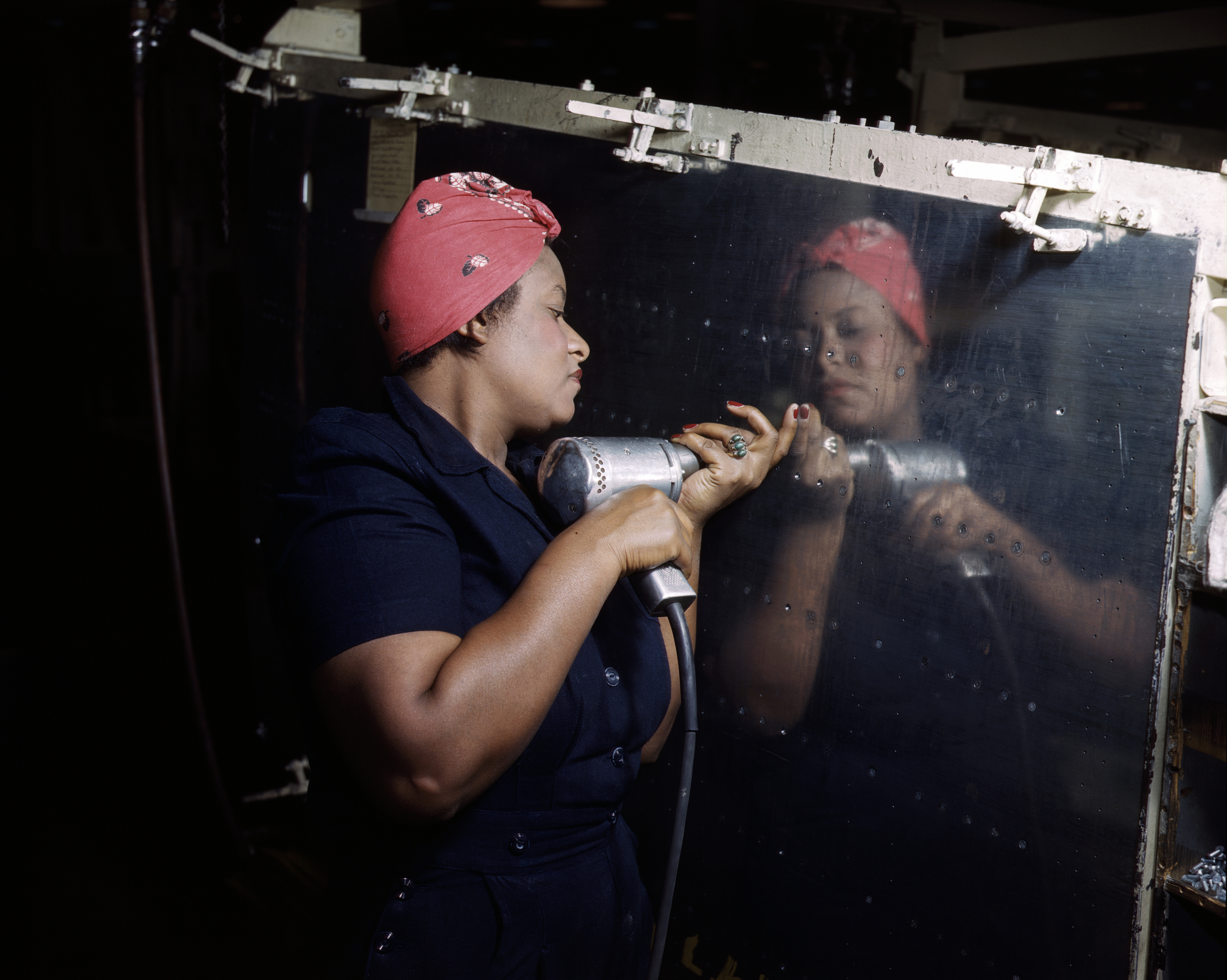
A real-life "Rosie the Riveter" operating a hand drill at Vultee-Nashville, Tennessee, working on an A-31 Vengeance dive bomber 1943.

Huge warplane plants were opened in Dallas-Fort Worth and Georgia. The most secret and expensive operation was at Oak Ridge, Tennessee, where unlimited amounts of locally generated electricity were used to prepare uranium for the atom bomb. The number of production workers doubled during the war. Most training centers, factories and shipyards were closed in 1945, but not all, and the families that left hardscrabble farms remained to find jobs in the growing urban South. The region had finally reached the take off stage into industrial and commercial growth, although its income and wage levels lagged well behind the national average. Nevertheless, as George B. Tindall notes, the transformation was, "The demonstration of industrial potential, new habits of mind, and a recognition that industrialization demanded community services."

Per capita income jumped 140% from 1940 to 1945, compared to 100% elsewhere in the United States. Southern income rose from 59% to 65%. Dewey Grantham says the war, "brought an abrupt departure from the South's economic backwardness, poverty, and distinctive rural life, as the region moved perceptively closer to the mainstream of national economic and social life."

== Remaking of the South 1945–1975 ==
African Americans responded to persistent oppression in the South with two major reactions: the Great Migration and the civil rights movement. The Great Migration began during World War I, hitting its high point during World War II. During this migration, Black people left the South and settled in northern cities like Chicago. This migration produced a new sense of independence in the black community and contributed to the vibrant black urban culture seen in the emergence of jazz and the blues from New Orleans and its spread north to Memphis and Chicago.

The migration also empowered the growing civil rights movement. While the movement existed in all parts of the United States, its focus was against the Jim Crow laws taking place in the South. Most of the major events in the movement occurred in the South, including the Montgomery bus boycott, the Birmingham campaign and its Children's Crusade, the Mississippi Freedom Summer, the Selma to Montgomery marches, and the assassination of Martin Luther King Jr. Some of the most important writings to come out of the movement were written in the South, such as King's "Letter from Birmingham Jail".

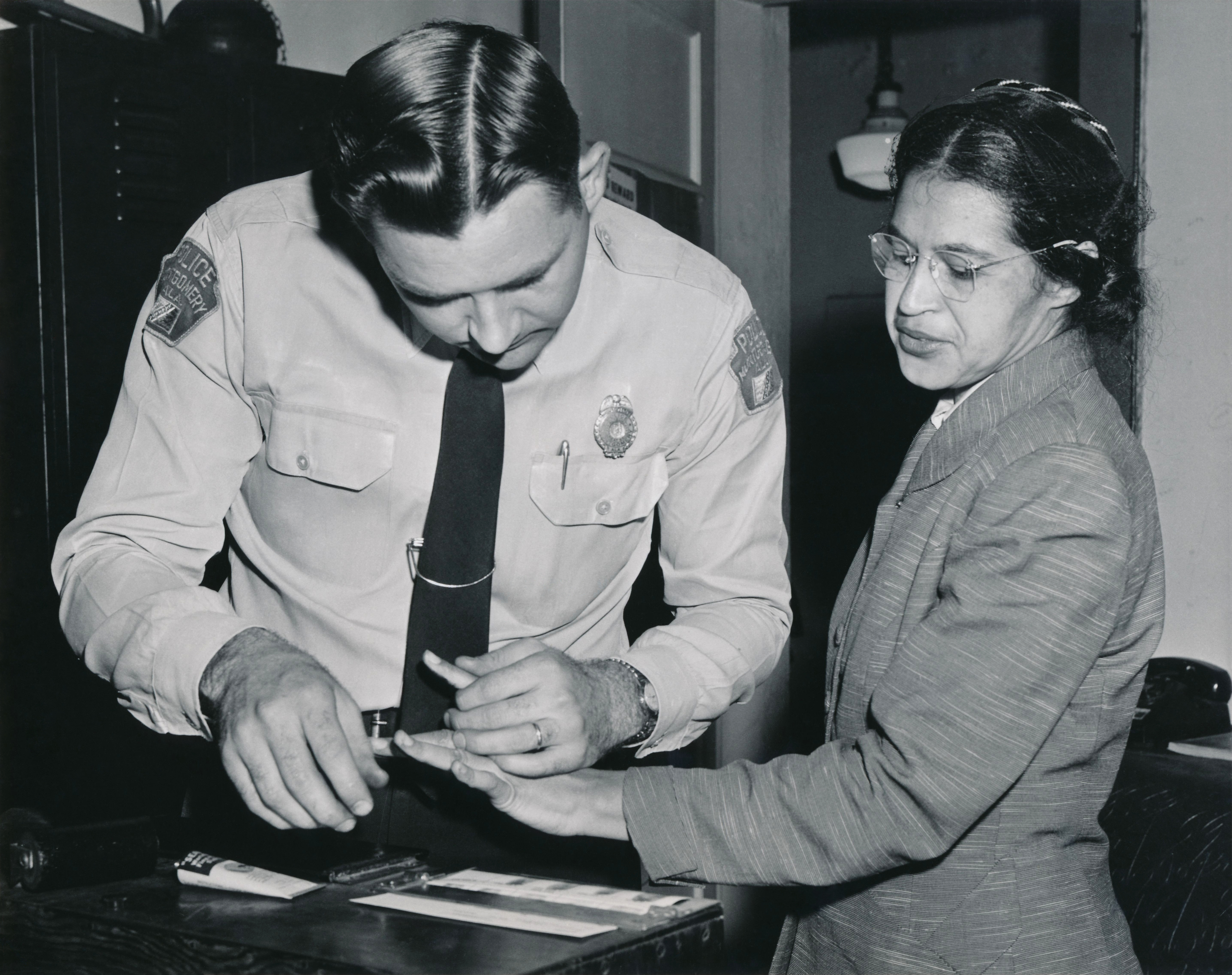
Rosa Parks being fingerprinted by Deputy Sheriff D.H. Lackey after being arrested on February 22, 1956, during the Montgomery bus boycott

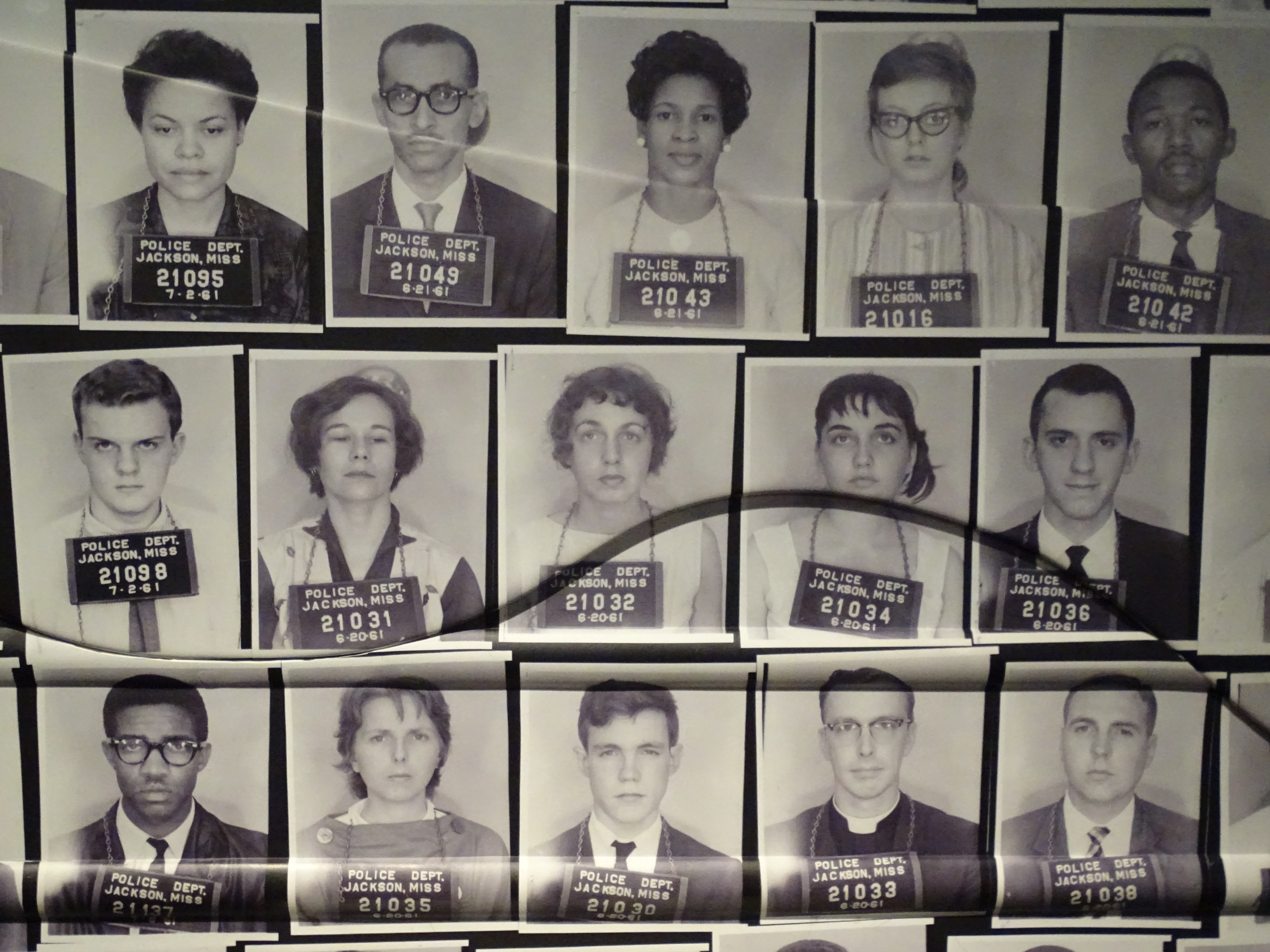
Freedom Riders that had been arrested and taken to a police department in Jackson, Mississippi.

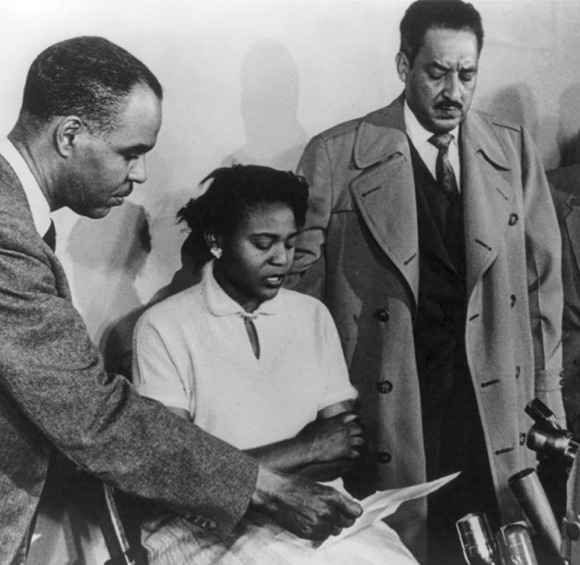
Roy Wilkins in press conference with Autherine Lucy and Thurgood Marshall, director and special counsel for NAACP Legal Defense and Education Fund]. Autherine Lucy was the first African-American student to attend the University of Alabama who later expelled her.

Confrontations escalated throughout the early 1960s. In summer 1963, there were 800 demonstrations in 200 southern cities and towns, with over 100,000 participants, and 15,000 arrests. In Alabama in June 1963, Governor George Wallace escalated the crisis by defying court orders to admit the first two black students to the University of Alabama. Doctor King launched a massive march on Washington in August 1963, bringing out 200,000 demonstrators in front of the Lincoln Memorial, the largest political assembly in the nation's history.

=== Federal civil rights legislation ===
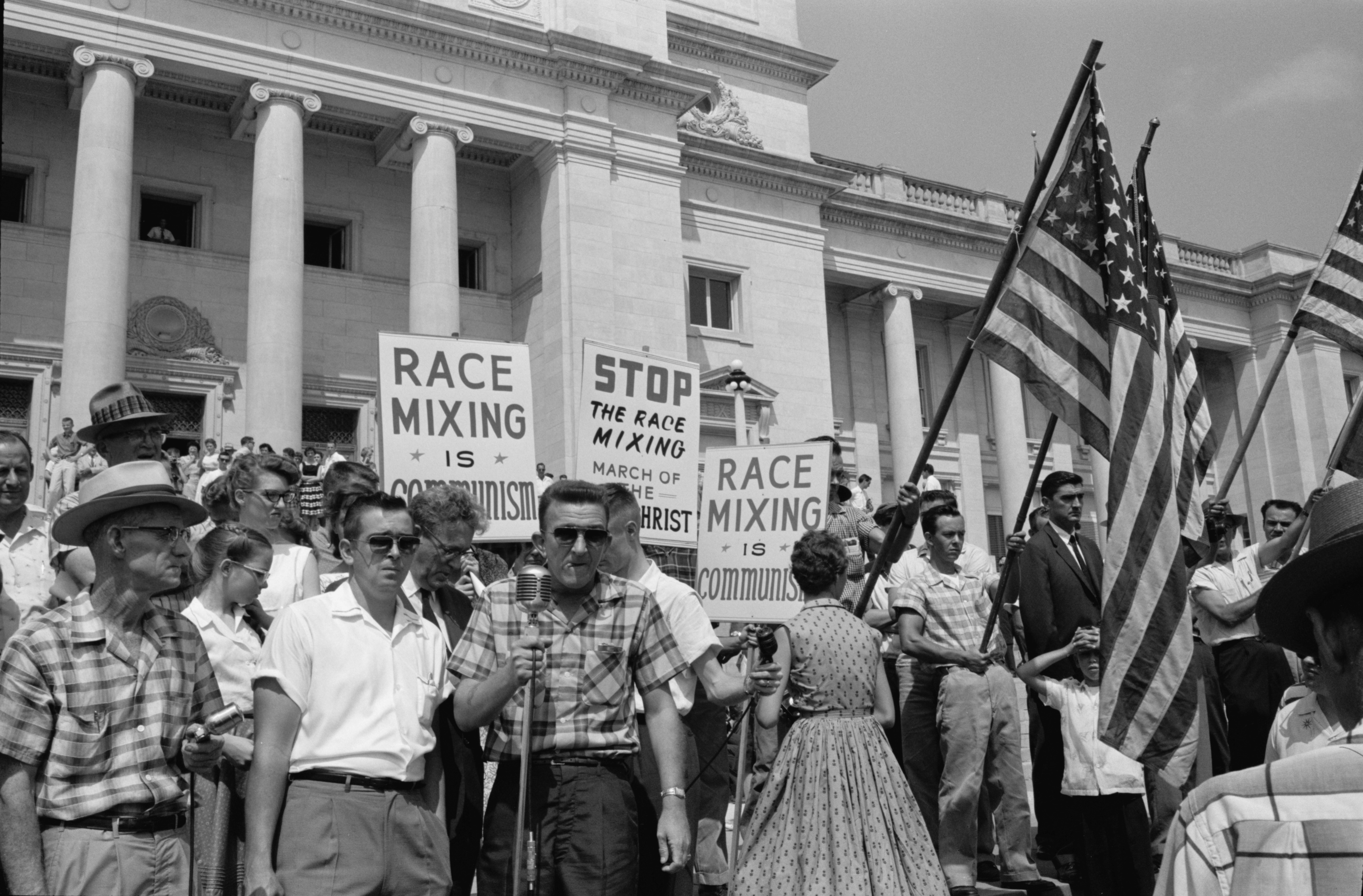
Segregationist protest in Little Rock, Arkansas; the National Guard was deployed to protect the Little Rock Nine going to school from racist rioters.

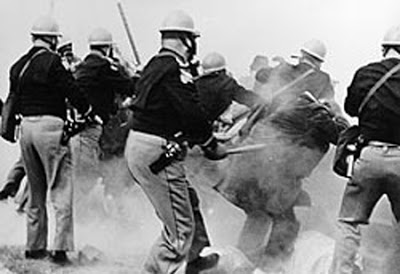
Bloody Sunday-Alabama police attack

Kennedy responded by sending Congress a comprehensive civil rights bill, and ordered Attorney General Robert Kennedy to file federal lawsuits against segregated schools, and to deny funds for discriminatory programs. The Kennedy administration now gave full-fledged support to the civil rights movement, but powerful southern congressmen blocked any legislation. After Kennedy was assassinated, President Lyndon Johnson (a Southerner himself) called for immediate passage of Kennedy civil rights legislation as a memorial to the martyred president. Johnson formed a coalition with Northern Republicans that led to passage in the House, and with the help of Republican Senate leader Everett Dirksen with passage in the Senate early in 1964. For the first time in history, the southern filibuster was broken and the Senate finally passed its version on June 19.

The Civil Rights Act of 1964 was the most powerful affirmation of equal rights ever made by Congress. It guaranteed access to public accommodations such as restaurants and places of amusement, authorized the Justice Department to bring suits to desegregate facilities in schools, gave new powers to the Civil Rights Commission, and allowed federal funds to be cut off in cases of discrimination. The South resisted until the last moment, but as soon as the new law was signed by President Johnson on July 2, 1964, it was widely accepted across the nation.

The movement for voting rights continued with the Selma to Montgomery marches in 1965. After violent confrontations, including the infamous "Bloody Sunday" at the Edmund Pettus Bridge, President Johnson addressed a televised joint session of Congress on March 15, using the words "we shall overcome", adopting the rallying cry of the civil rights movement. The Voting Rights Act of 1965 was introduced in Congress two days later.

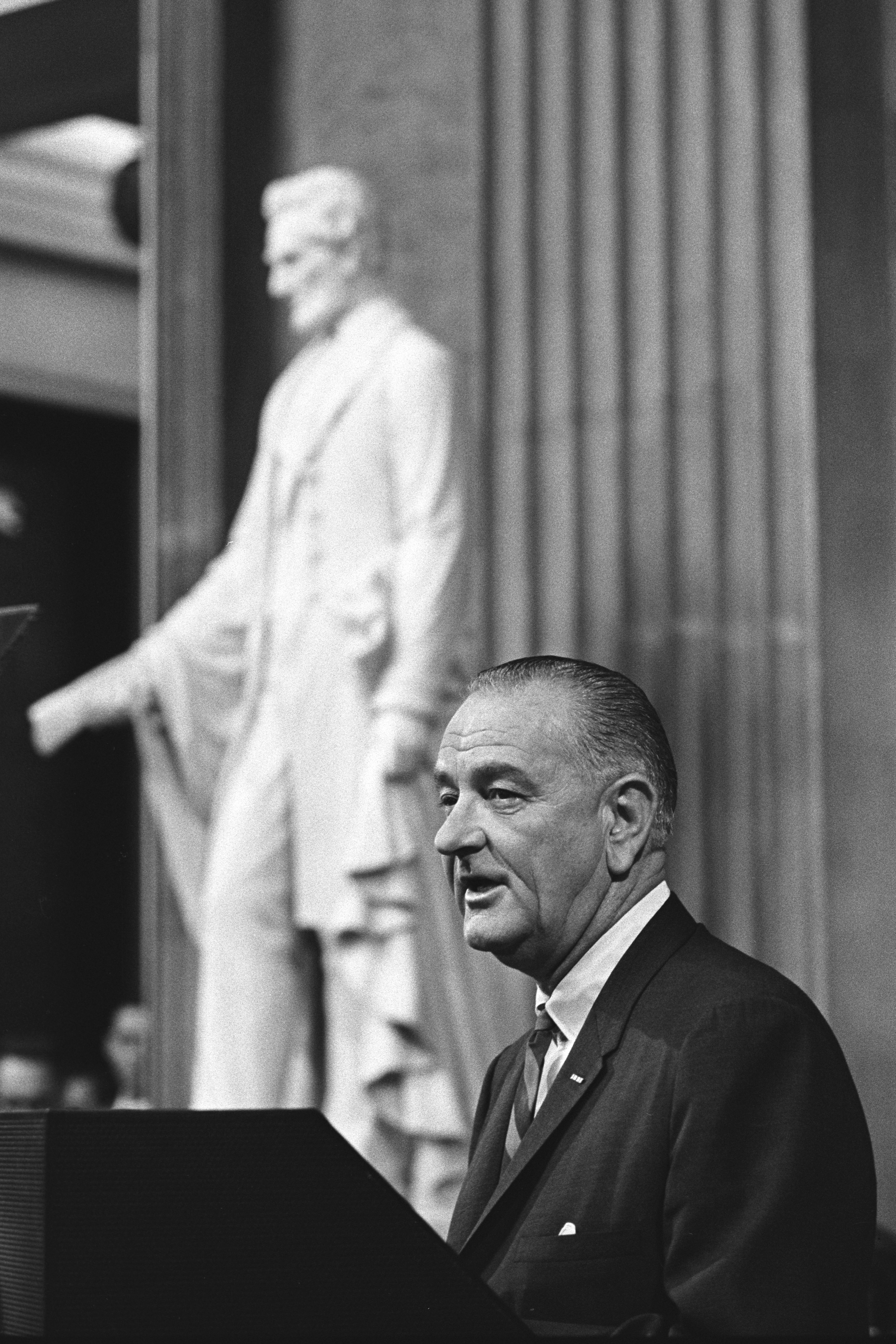
President Lyndon Johnson Delivers Remarks at the Signing Ceremony for the Voting Rights Act in the Capitol Rotunda

Lyndon Johnson's Remarks on the Signing of the Voting Rights Act, 1965

=== Impact of the Civil Rights Movement and the Great Society ===
After the passage of the Voting Rights Act, President Lyndon Johnson launched the War on Poverty. This ambitious set of programs sought to eradicate poverty across the United States. When the program began, 45.9 percent of America's impoverished lived in the South though it had only 31% of the population. Fifty years later, poverty did not disappear but it was also less concentrated in the Southeast Region and was more balanced across the country as a whole.

The civil rights movement coincided with the collapse of the traditional plantation system that had defined the South for centuries. Economic historians emphasize that external forces caused the disintegration from the 1920s to the 1970s. As Harold D. Woodman explains, "Depression-bred New Deal reforms, war-induced demand for labor in the North, perfection of cotton-picking machinery, and civil rights legislation and court decisions finally... destroyed the plantation system, undermined landlord or merchant hegemony, diversified agriculture and transformed it from a labor- to a capital-intensive industry, and ended the legal and extra-legal support for racism."

Since the enactment of the Civil Rights Act of 1964 and Voting Rights Act of 1965, black people have gone on to hold many offices within the Southern states. Black people have been elected or appointed as mayors or police chiefs in cities across the South, including Atlanta, Birmingham, Charlotte, Houston, Memphis, Montgomery, Nashville, New Orleans, and Richmond. They have also gone on to serve in both the U.S. Congress and state legislatures of Southern states.

Since 1970, the proportion of the African American population living in the South stabilized and began slightly increasing, as economic opportunities and political representation improved.

== Contemporary South (1975–present) ==
=== Political transformation ===
Southern liberals were an essential part of the New Deal coalition – without them Roosevelt lacked majorities in Congress. They promoted subsidies for small farmers, and supported the nascent labor union movement. An essential condition for this north–south coalition was for northern liberals to ignore the problem of racism throughout the South and elsewhere in the country. After 1945, however, northern liberals – led especially by young Hubert Humphrey of Minnesota – increasingly made civil rights a central issue. The conservative Southern Democrats – the Dixiecrats – took control of the state parties in half the region and ran Strom Thurmond for president against Truman. Thurmond carried only the Deep South, but that threat was enough to guarantee the national Democratic Party in 1952 and 1956 would not make civil rights a major issue. In 1956, 101 of the 128 southern congressmen and senators signed the Southern Manifesto denouncing forced desegregation.

The labor movement in the South was divided, and lost its political influence. Southern liberals were in a quandary – most of them kept quiet or moderated their liberalism, others switched sides, and the rest continued on the liberal path. One by one, the last group was defeated; historian Numan V. Bartley states, "Indeed, the very word 'liberal' gradually disappeared from the southern political lexicon, except as a term of opprobrium."

The Republican candidates for president have won the South in elections since 1972, except for 1976. The region is not, however, entirely monolithic, and every successful Democratic candidate since 1976 has claimed at least three Southern states. Barack Obama won Florida, Maryland, Delaware, North Carolina, and Virginia in 2008 but did not repeat his victory in North Carolina during his 2012 reelection campaign. Joe Biden also performed well for a modern Democrat in the South, winning Maryland, Delaware, Virginia, and Georgia, in the 2020 United States presidential election.

=== Confederate monument removal ===
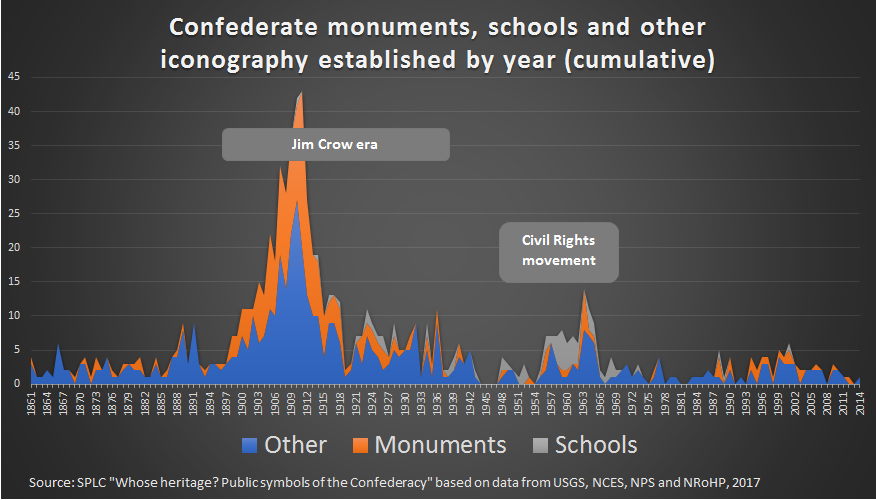
Confederate monuments, schools and other iconography established by year

More than 160 monuments and memorials to the Confederate States of America and associated figures have been removed from public spaces in the United States, mostly in the south all but five after 2015. More than 700 such monuments and memorials have been created on public land, the vast majority in the South during the era of Jim Crow laws from 1877 to 1964. Efforts to remove them increased after the Charleston church shooting in 2015, the Unite the Right rally in 2017, and the murder of George Floyd in 2020.

Proponents of their removal cite historical analysis that the monuments were not built as memorials, but to intimidate African Americans and reaffirm white supremacy after the Civil War. Opponents view removing the monuments as erasing history or a sign of disrespect for heritage; white nationalists and neo-Nazis in particular have mounted protests and opposition to the removals. Some Southern states passed state laws restricting or prohibiting the removal or alteration of public monuments.

=== Economic and social transformation ===
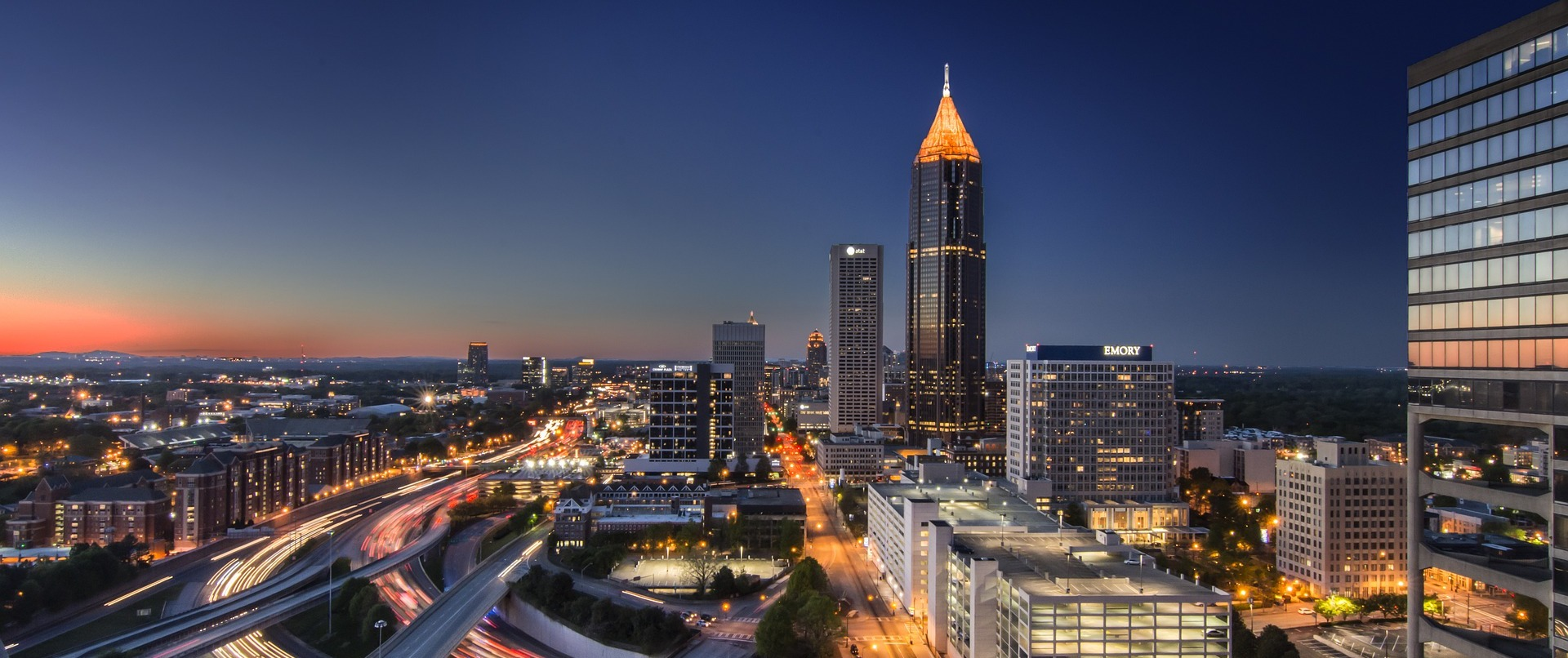
View of Midtown Atlanta (2016)

In the decades following World War II, the old agrarian Southern economy evolved into the "New South" – a manufacturing region. High-rise buildings began to emerge throughout the mid-to-late 20th century, in skylines of cities such as Atlanta, Charlotte, Dallas, Houston, Memphis, Miami, Nashville, New Orleans, San Antonio, and Tampa. The former main economic base that focused largely on agriculture, such as cotton production, was phased out with mechanization technologies and economic diversification of new industries. There were 1.5 million cotton farms in 1945, and only 18,600 remained in 2009. By 2020, many Fortune 500 companies were headquartered in the South. Texas led the nation by having over 50, Virginia with 22, Georgia with 18, Florida with 18, North Carolina with 13, and Tennessee with 10. There were also 149 Fortune 500 companies in the entire Southeast region including the District of Columbia.

The industrialization and modernization of the South continued to pick up speed with the ending of racial segregation policies in the 1960s. Today, the economy of the South is a diverse mixture of agriculture, light and heavy industry, tourism, and high technology companies, that help serve both the national economy and global economy. State governments in the South recruited corporate businesses to the "Sun Belt", promising more enjoyable weather, a lower cost of living, skilled work force positions, minimal taxes, weak labor unions, and a business-friendly environment.

With the expansion of jobs in the South, there has been migration of people from other U.S. regions and immigrants from other countries, increasing the population and political influence of southern states. The newcomers and growing population within the region helped in displacing the old rural political system, built around courthouse cliques from the late 19th century through mid-20th century. Many suburb areas became the base of the emerging Republican Party within the region, which became dominant in presidential elections by 1968, and in most state politics by the 1990s.

Despite historical Indian removal policies, dozens of Native American communities in the southeastern United States maintained their cultural identity while adapting to modernization, though many continue to face challenges in gaining Federal recognition. Since the 1970s, Native American communities in the Southern United States engaged in sustained political activism, leading to the establishment of state Native American commissions and social movements addressing discrimination and poverty.

During the 20th century, millions of non-Southern U.S. migrants and retirees have moved down for job opportunities and mild winters. The arrival of millions of non-southern U.S. migrants (especially in the suburbs and coastal areas), including millions of Hispanics, along with many immigrants from different countries, has led to the introduction of different cultural values and social norms not rooted in Southern traditions. The influx of Hispanic immigrants to the American South since 1980 has significantly transformed the region's economy, society, and culture. This demographic shift has led to increased labor participation in low-wage sectors, particularly food processing, offering newcomers opportunities for upward mobility. The growing Latino population has boosted regional purchasing power but also created challenges in education, healthcare, and social services. The integration of Latino immigrants has reshaped racial dynamics, sometimes leading to tensions with existing communities while also creating new forms of cooperation and cultural exchange. Successful incorporation depends on meaningful interactions between Latino and non-Latino residents, as well as the development of social and human capital. The adaptation of both Latino immigrants and Southern communities to these changes may serve as a model for other regions experiencing similar demographic shifts.

Observers conclude that collective identity and Southern distinctiveness are thus declining, particularly when defined against "an earlier South that was somehow more authentic, real, more unified and distinct." The process has worked both ways, however, with aspects of Southern culture spreading throughout a greater portion of the rest of the United States in a process termed "Southernization".

== South's impact on the United States ==
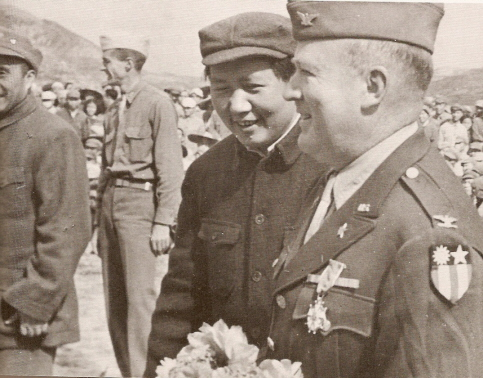
'Dixie' Mission commander Colonel David D. Barrett and Mao Zedong in Yenan, 1944

Throughout southern history, exports were the main foundation of the southern economy, starting with tobacco, rice and indigo in the colonial period. After 1800, cotton comprised the chief export of the United States. In the American Civil War, Confederate officials thought mistakenly that European need for cotton would require intervention to help the South, for "Cotton is King." Southerners calculated their need for international markets called for aggressive internationalist foreign policies.

The South always had a strong, aggressive interest in foreign affairs, especially regarding expansion to the Southwest, and the importance of foreign markets for Southern exports of cotton, tobacco and oil. All the southern colonies supported the American Revolution, with Virginia taking a leading position within the colonies. The South generally supported the War of 1812, in sharp distinction to the strong opposition in the Northeast, from the remaining Federalist Party activists. Southern Democrats took the lead in support of Texas annexation, and the war with Mexico. Woodrow Wilson, who served as U.S. president from 1913 to 1921, had a strong base in the South for his foreign policy regarding World War I and the League of Nations. In the 1930s, isolationism and America First attitudes were weakest in the South, and internationalism strongest there. Southern Conservative Democrats opposed the domestic policies of the New Deal, but strongly supported Franklin Roosevelt's internationalist foreign policy during World War II. Historians have given various explanations for this characteristic, such as the region having a strong military tradition. Rather than pacifism, the South fostered chivalry and honor, pride in its fighting ability, and indifference to violence. During the Vietnam War, there were some dissenters from aggression such as J. William Fulbright (Arkansas), and Martin Luther King Jr. (Georgia), as opposed to Lyndon Johnson (Texas) and Secretary of State Dean Rusk (Georgia), but the war was generally more supported in the South.

Since the 1970s, Southern cultural, political, and religious influences have spread throughout the United States in a process scholars term "Southernization." The rise of the Sun Belt and the spread of commercialized Southern white culture during the 1970s led to a cultural and political shift away from the North's traditional dominance. This transformation saw the South evolve from a "burdensome regional anomaly" to a region fully integrated into national life, with Southern values increasingly influencing national attitudes. The demise of the Democratic South and rise of the Republican-dominated South, along with the influence of Southern white evangelical Christianity, has had the greatest impact on the transformation of U.S. politics and government since 1968. However, this cultural spread has been complex, with Southern evangelicalism itself being transformed through its encounter with secularism as it expanded beyond the South.

== See also ==
- African-American culture
- African-American history
- American gentry as Southern plantation owners
- Black Belt in the American South
- Border states (American Civil War)
- Civil rights movement (1896–1954)
- Colonial history of the United States
- Culture of honor (Southern United States)
- Culture of the Southern United States
- Dueling in the Southern United States
- History of African-American education
- History of education in the Southern United States
- Juneteenth, celebrating the abolition of slavery
- Politics of the Southern United States
- Rural American history
- Southern United States literature
