= The Photographic History of the Civil War =

1911 compilation in 10 volumes

The Photographic History of the Civil War In Ten Volumes: Thousands of Scenes Photographed 1861-65, with Text by many Special Authorities
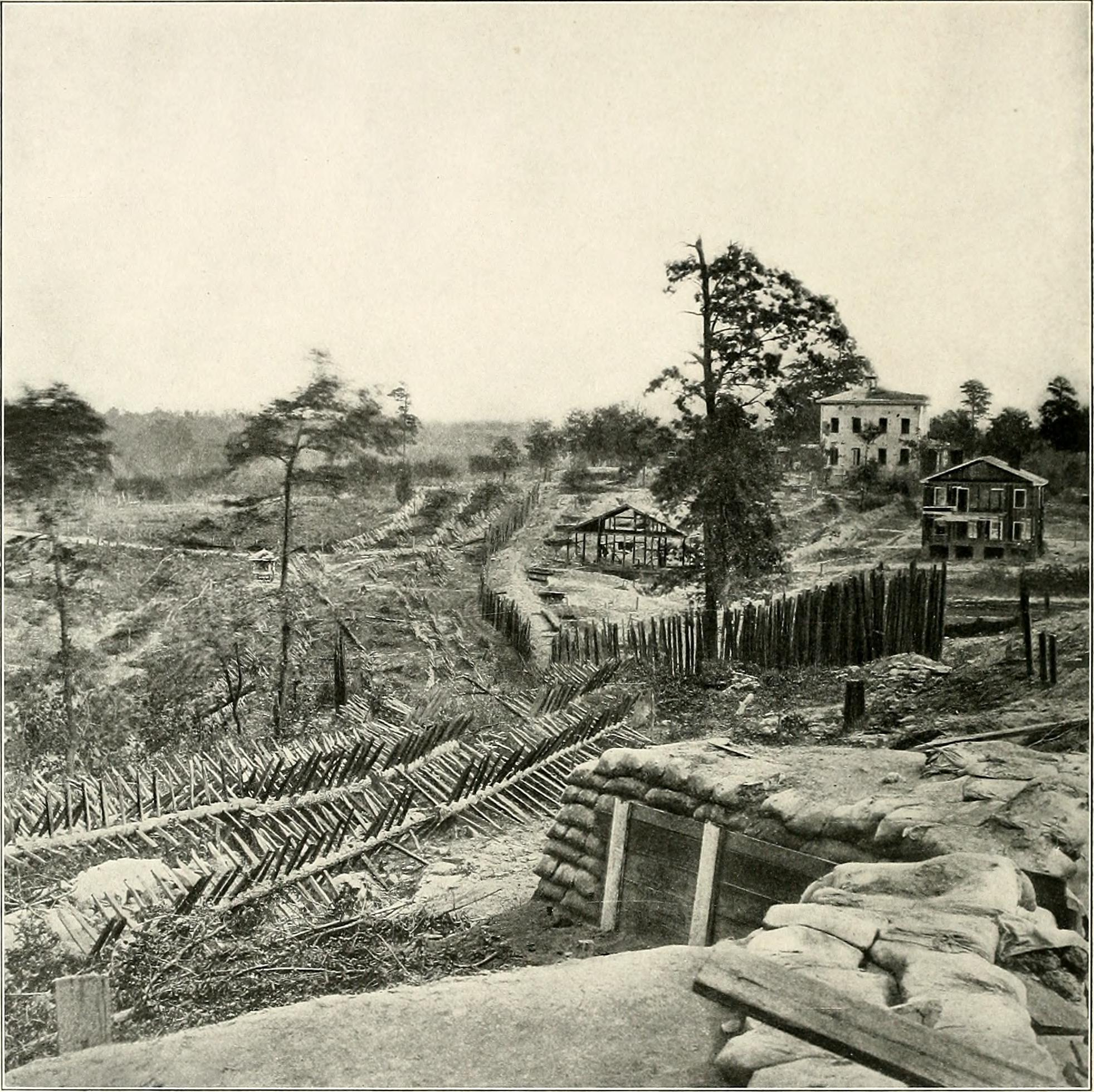
- "Palisades and chevaux-de-frise guarding Atlanta": This image of Confederate defenses around Atlanta, Georgia, as encountered by Gen. Sherman, appears in Volume 3 of The Photographic History of the Civil War, page 126
- Author: Francis Trevelyan Miller, Editor-in-Chief; Robert S. Lanier, managing editor
- Illustrator: Photographers of the American Civil War
- Language: en-us
- Publisher: The Review of Reviews Co.
- Publication date: 1911
- Publication place: New York City, NY, US
- Pages: 3,600 (app.)
- OCLC: 1467122
- Dewey Decimal: 973.7
- LC Class: 11011566

The Photographic History of the Civil War In Ten Volumes: Thousands of Scenes Photographed 1861-65, with Text by many Special Authorities, as the full title reads, or The Photographic History of the Civil War for short, is a ten-tome compilation of war photography of the American Civil War of 1861–1865. Advance copies of individual volumes started being released sequentially from June 1911 onward for the semi-centennial of the beginning of the war, and finished up towards year's end, though the publisher had expressed the expectation to have had already finished up in mid-August 1911 in their accompanying letter to early customers who had taken out an advance subscription on the deluxe "Limited Edition" at reduced pre-retail release sales prices. Featuring a then-unprecedented total of 3,389 photographic images spread over 360 pages of each of the ten 7 1/4 in × 10 in (180 mm × 250 mm) measuring volumes, a hard copy of the complete collection weighs in at 42 lb (19 kg). The work is in the public domain and has since been digitized for use online. The lead editor was Francis Trevelyan Miller, who "conducted a nationwide hunt for old photos", though most of the actual legwork and discoveries made was done by his assistant Roy M. Mason, a recent Yale University graduate he had specifically hired for the chore, but did not bother to credit as such – though he was in the contents of each volume credited for the "Photograph Descriptions".

A 1988 bibliography retold a bit of the history of the compilation:

Edited by one of the time's leading historians, Francis T. Miller, it first appeared as a series of paperback, magazine-like booklets. A ten-volume, blue-backed set of the complete series appeared in 1911, on the 50th anniversary of the beginning of the war. Perhaps the most interesting chapter is the very first one in the first volume, "Photographing the Civil War," by Henry Wysham Lanier, which both describes period efforts to photograph the war and shows pictures of photographers in the field. Many of the images in this book were obtained from veterans who were able to provide first-hand captions.

Publisher The Review of Reviews Co. executed the constituent volumes of their collection in three edition variants; as the regular embossed cobalt blue silk cloth-bound hardcover edition with the likewise embossed cobalt blue faux-leatherette, "The Three-Quarters Morocco" binding, hardcover edition as the slightly more expensive luxury option, both of them with text-only dust jackets – essentially a duplicate of each volume's title page – the latter having been the most preferred edition, according to a contemporary bookseller's letter to interested parties. Customers who had ordered a complete set at the publisher or local bookstore had their set shipped to them in a for the era typical heavy-duty wooden transport crate that prominently featured the title and publisher name burned into the wood of the crate. The third embossed edition variant concerned the individually numbered 1,000 copy deluxe gold imprinted dark brown leather-bound "Limited Edition", aka "The Full Persian Morocco" binding, aka the "Semi-Centennial Memorial Edition" set, and which was the edition chosen to serve as the advance release before the set became available at retail in its entirety as touched upon above. The actual printing of the work was performed by The Trow Press, also located in New York City. Aside from the three editions of the collection itself, the publisher also released "The Passing of a Great Chance" portfolio, containing a selection of several larger, 8 x 12 inch, printed photographic folios from their publication as a promotional tool for both the publisher itself as well as retail booksellers to inform and entice potential customers, 296,462 of them having already paid to receive one by early 1912, according to a contemporary bookseller's letter to interested parties.

Volumes:

1. The Opening Battles.
2. Two Years of Grim War.
3. The Decisive Battles.
4. The Cavalry.
5. Forts and Artillery.
6. The Navies.
7. Prisons and Hospitals.
8. Soldier Life and Secret Service.
9. Poetry and Eloquence.
10. Armies and Leaders.

Over a century into its release, the work remains considered a "landmark" and "the bible of Civil War photography." It is concurrently still deemed a crucial reference resource for historians and a classic work in the field. Civil War scholar and bibliographer Ralph Newman called the work in 1963, "(...)the great photographic source work for the war...The text has many errors, but the photographs are superb," with contemporary historian Allan Nevins having stated that the work "(...)still remains the major source for photographs of the Civil War; the greatest single collection of Brady illustrations." Newman's latter-day successor, David J. Eicher, also subscribed to the same opinion as his predecessor(s), declaring in his influential 1996 "The Civil War in Books: An Analytical Bibliography" (ISBN 0252022734) reference book that Miller's publication continued to be "[t]he grandfather of pictorial histories, this mammoth work is a necessary part of any Civil War library. The work contains 3,389 images that constitute an important source on the war's appearance - its battlefields, common soldiers, officers, forts, diseases, camp scenes, army movements, and materiel."

By the early 1950s it was "long out of print" but the "desideratum" of avid Civil War collectors and historians; reprinting was considered but it was determined that it would be an "economic impossibility".

That early assessment notwithstanding though, a first five-volume (each collecting two of the original volumes) facsimile reprint was already released in 1957 by New York City publisher Thomas Yoseloff with an introduction by Henry Steele Commager, a contemporary American historian (OCLC 444833). And as if to underscore that the early 1950s assessment had become completely invalid by then, a second ten-volume facsimile reprint edition was in the same year released by Castle Books, also operating out off New York (OCLC 1118180). Several further reprint editions from a wide variety of publishers have followed suit since, especially after Miller's work had entered the public domain in 1986, which immediately precipitated a reprint edition of the 2-in-1 Yoseloff version a year later by the Blue & Grey Press, a division of Book Sales, Inc., Secaucus, NJ. (OCLC 17757174) One of the more notable reprint editions became the 1995 limited deluxe "Collector's Edition" from Easton Press. Lacking ISBNs and bound in genuine black leather with gold text imprints, it was essentially Easton Press' rendition of the original 1911 leather bound "Limited Edition". The facsimile rendition actually profited from modern scanning techniques, making it the superior one of the two where the quality of photographic reproduction was concerned. As a result, it is not too hard to come by an edition of the set at affordable prices on the second-hand book markets as there are many around; even the original 1911 edition appeared to have been disseminated in fairly large numbers at the time (30,327 copies sold within four months after editorial work on the collection was completed, according to a contemporary bookseller's letter to interested parties) as they are to this day regularly offered on auction sites like eBay.com, albeit at slightly higher prices. Copies of the 1911 release that still have their original dust jackets (and/or original shipping crate), not to mention the "Limited Edition", are a lot rarer though – and thus a lot more expensive.

== Emulation: The Image of War, 1861–1865 ==
The Image of War, 1861–1865
- Edited by: William C. Davis, Editor-in-Chief; Bell I. Wiley, Senior Consulting Editor
- Illustrator: Photographers of the American Civil War
- Country: New York City, NY, US
- Language: en-us
- Genre: History
- Publisher: Doubleday & Company, Inc. Black Dog & Leventhal Publishers (=Tess Press)
- Published: 1981–2000
- Media type: print
- No. of books: 6 (1981-84); 2 (1994); 1 (2000)

A significant later effort to collect and publish photos of the American Civil War in an almost duplicate manner as the 1911 release, was the National Historical Society's 2,768-page The Image of War, 1861–1865 in six volumes under the overall auspices of renowned Civil War historians William C. Davis and Bell I. Wiley as senior editors. The six, 464-496 page each, volume collection was released by Doubleday & Company, Inc., New York from 1981-84 as oversized hardcover in dust jacket tomes. Nearly half of the photographic content was now taken up by almost two thousand newly discovered photographs since 1911 with the other half being taken up by the ones already featured in the 1911 release. For their release Davis and Wiley specifically focused on correcting Roy Mason's numerous erroneous photograph captions of the 1911 edition – not being a professional historian, original caption writer Mason had taken whatever information the photograph donors (not rarely still living Civil War veterans or their next-of-kin themselves) had been able or willing to provide him with at face value at the time. On the other hand, the introductory essays that preceded each chapter were entirely unrelated to the original ones of the 1911 edition, but were completely written anew by Davis' and Wiley's staff of historians as the original by "Special Authorities" written essays had been very biased and were lacking historical objectivity. Besides correcting the historical inaccuracies in the captions, the huge post-1911 advancements in reproduction printing techniques of photographic images was furthered as an additional motivation to have embarked on the project. An explanatory five-page foreword in Volume I that put the work in historical context, particularly in relation to Miller's original work, was written by Davis himself – Wiley had died shortly before the release of Volume I and was eulogized by Davis in his foreword.

The series saw a two-volume Civil War Times Illustrated: Photographic History of The Civil War reprint edition in 1994 by Black Dog & Leventhal Publishers, New York (OCLC 30971092), with each 1,376-page volume collecting three volumes of the original Doubleday publication. Each tome came with a newly written three-page foreword by Davis (who incidentally, had also been the publisher and main editor of the Civil War Times Illustrated magazine – hence its reference in the reprint title), merely giving the original 1911 edition a cursory mention in passing this time around, and that in the second volume foreword only, despite the work now carrying the near-same (abbreviated) title as the original. Under its "Tess Press" imprint, the publisher also released an edited and abridged one-volume Civil War: A Complete Photographic History 932-page excerpt hardcover without dust jacket variant edition in 2000, featuring only the (smaller reproduced) photographs and their captions, but not the historical essays. Four loose frameable maps were included in a pocket sleeve that came with the book. That edition enjoyed two printings in 2000, each with its own ISBN (ISBN 1579124097, 160376304X).

Davis revisited his own work of sorts, when he had his September 2002 "The Civil War in Photographs" published by UK publisher Carlton Books, Ltd. (ISBN 1842226363), featuring a little over 350 photographs he himself had selected from the ones he had already gathered for the previous releases. A budget-priced mass market hardcover in dust jacket publication at 256 pages, it was essentially an even more abridged variant of the 2000 Tess Print release.

Volume titles of The Image of War, 1861–1865
Doubleday & Company, Inc.			Black Dog & Leventhal Publishers		
Vol.	Title	Date & ISBN	Vol.	Title	Date & ISBN
I	Shadows of the Storm	July 14, 1981, ISBN 0385154666	1	Fort Sumter to Gettysburg	January 10, 1994, ISBN 1884822088
II	The Guns of '62	January 12, 1982, ISBN 0385154674	1	Fort Sumter to Gettysburg	January 10, 1994, ISBN 1884822088
III	The Embattled Confederacy	July 27, 1982, ISBN 0385154682	1	Fort Sumter to Gettysburg	January 10, 1994, ISBN 1884822088
IV	Fighting for Time	March 15, 1983, ISBN 0385182805	2	Vicksburg to Appomattox	January 10, 1994, ISBN 1884822096
V	The South Besieged	September 21, 1983, ISBN 0385182813	2	Vicksburg to Appomattox	January 10, 1994, ISBN 1884822096
VI	The End of an Era	August 14, 1984, ISBN 0385182821	2	Vicksburg to Appomattox	January 10, 1994, ISBN 1884822096

== See also ==
- Photographers of the American Civil War
- Bibliography of the American Civil War
- A History of the Negro Troops in the War of the Rebellion, 1861–1865 (1888)
- War of the Rebellion Atlas (1895)
