= Mattie Clyburn Rice =

African-American member of the United Daughters of the Confederacy

- Born: September 15, 1922; Marshville, North Carolina, U.S.
- Died: September 1, 2014 (aged 91); Archdale, North Carolina, U.S.
- Resting place: Hillcrest Cemetery; Monroe, North Carolina, U.S.
- Known for: United Daughters of the Confederacy
- Parent: Weary Clyburn (father)

Mattie Clyburn Rice (September 15, 1922 – September 1, 2014) was an African-American member of the United Daughters of the Confederacy. As the daughter of a Confederate Veteran, she is considered a "Real Daughter of the Confederacy" by the United Daughters of the Confederacy, and is the second African-American woman to be recognized as such. At the time of her induction into the United Daughters of the Confederacy, she was one of twenty-three women who were living daughters of Confederate veterans. Rice successfully campaigned for her father and nine other African-American men, one freedman and eight enslaved, to be recognized for their Civil War service with a historical marker in Monroe, North Carolina.

== Biography ==
Rice was born on September 15, 1922, in Marshville, North Carolina to a young mother and an elderly father. When Rice was born, her father, Weary Clyburn, was already seventy-four years old. He was formerly enslaved and had served as a bodyguard for his enslaver, Captain Thomas Frank Clyburn, in the 12th South Carolina Infantry Regiment of the Confederate States Army during the American Civil War. According to his military pension record, Clyburn was at the Battle of Port Royal at Hilton Head Island, South Carolina, carrying his enslaver out of the field on his shoulder, and later, he performed personal service for General Robert E. Lee. Clyburn was born a slave on the Uriah Plantation in Lancaster County, South Carolina, owned by Thomas Frank Clyburn. According to historian Kevin Levin, Rice's father did not serve the Confederate army willingly, but was forced to serve in the army by his owner. According to the North Carolina Museum of History, Rice was one of the last living people in North Carolina to be the daughter of a formerly enslaved person.

Rice successfully campaigned for her father and nine other African-American men (one freedman and eight enslaved) to be recognized for their Civil War service with a state historical marker in Monroe, North Carolina.

She grew up during the Jim Crow Era, when racial segregation was the law in North Carolina. When Rice found her father's Confederate military pension application from 1926, in the State Archives of North Carolina, she began receiving calls from various Civil War groups. Upon discovering that Rice was a "Real Daughter of the Confederacy", a daughter of a Confederate veteran, Gail Crosby invited her to join the United Daughters of the Confederacy. Rice is the second African-American Real Daughter of the Confederacy to be recognized by the organization. Two of Rice's daughters also became UDC members. She was awarded the 2012–2013 DeWitt Smith Jobe Award for Best Division Newsletter by The Carolina Confederate. In 2013, she was presented the Horace L. Hunley Award by the Sons of Confederate Veterans.

She died from congestive heart failure on September 1, 2014, at her home in Archdale, North Carolina. Her ashes were buried at her father's grave in Hillcrest Cemetery in Monroe. A color guard from the Sons of Confederate Veterans was present at her funeral. The North Carolina and South Carolina State Presidents of the United Daughters of the Confederacy spoke at her funeral.

== See also ==
- Georgia Benton, African-American member of the United Daughters of the Confederacy
- H. K. Edgerton, African-American member of the Sons of Confederate Veterans
- Nelson W. Winbush, African-American member of the Sons of Confederate Veterans
