= Eugenia Jones Bacon =

American writer (1840–1920)

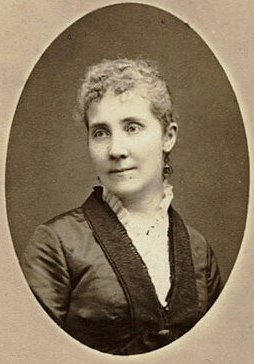
- Eugenia Jones Bacon, circa 1895
- Born: Eugenia Amanda Jones; 1840; Liberty County, Georgia
- Died: 1920 (aged 79–80); Pasadena, California
- Resting place: Oakland Cemetery (Atlanta)
- Spouse: Oliver Thomas Bacon
- Children: 1
- Writing career
- Notable work: Lyddy: A Tale of the Old South

Eugenia Jones Bacon (1840-1920) was an American writer, known for her novel Lyddy: A Tale of the Old South (1898), a pro-slavery response to Uncle Tom's Cabin (1852) by Harriet Beecher Stowe. Bacon based the novel on memories of her childhood on her father's plantation in Liberty County, Georgia. She also wrote about a rock she collected in Bavaria with an edge reminiscent of the visage of Jesus. She also wrote The Red Moon published in 1910 by the Neale Publishing Company (Eugenie Jones-Bacon).

== Early life ==
Bacon was born Eugenia Amanda Jones in Liberty County, Georgia in 1840, and grew up on her father's rice plantation, Green Forest. In 1850, Bacon's mother, Saccharissa Axson Jones, died due to complications from giving birth to her ninth child. Her father, Moses Liberty Jones, died less than a year later. Tax records from 1850 list Moses Jones as owning 6,987 acres (28.28 km^{2}) of land and 110 slaves, making him one of the wealthiest people in Liberty County. After his death, his land and property were divided among his children.

Bacon graduated from Greensborough Female College in 1855 and married Liberty County plantation owner Oliver Thomas Bacon in 1858. The couple had one child, Edwin Jones Bacon.

== Civil War ==
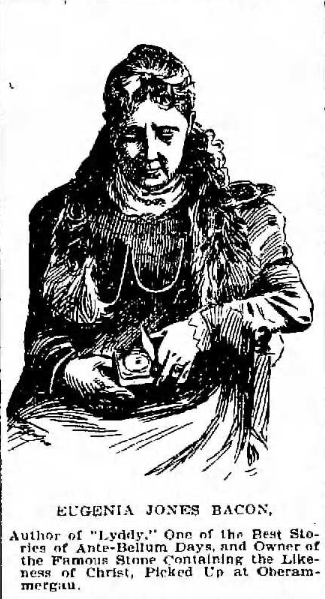
Illustrated portrait of Eugenia Jones Bacon from the Atlanta Constitution, 1899

During the American Civil War, Bacon and her husband fled to southwest Georgia due to the advancement of the Union Army. After the end of the war, they moved to Atlanta, where Oliver Bacon worked as a life insurance agent.

== Reconstruction ==
In 1873, Bacon's husband and only child died of typhoid fever, making her vulnerable to financial instability. Between the late 1870s and the late 1890s, Bacon worked as a chaperone and art teacher; as part of her role, she traveled in Europe.

In 1880, Bacon travelled to Oberammergau in Bavaria, Germany, where she attended a performance of the Oberammergau Passion Play. While there, she collected rocks from Kopfel mountain (Kofel). In 1888, Bacon reportedly noticed that one of the rocks resembled the face of Jesus. She called the rock the "Natural Portrait Stone" and the "Wonder Stone," and published three works about it, in 1891, 1896, and 1899 (A Stone from Oberammergau: With a Description of This Wonderful Phenomenon. New York: J. Pott & Co. (1891); The Stone Portrait of the Man of Sorrows, An Ideal of Patient Suffering. London: Lamley (1896); and The Real Stone Face; or, Suffering Depicted by Nature. Atlanta: Foote & Davies (1899).

In 1898, Bacon published the novel Lyddy: A Tale of the Old South, in part as a pro-slavery rebuttal to Harriet Beecher Stowe's Uncle Tom's Cabin, which advocated for abolitionism.

Bacon later moved to California, and died in Pasadena, California in 1920. She was buried in Oakland Cemetery in Atlanta.

== Lyddy: A Tale of the Old South ==
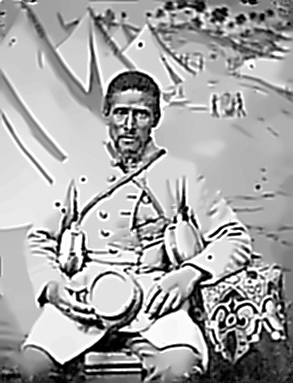
Ambrotype of Marlboro Jones, the slave who inspired the character of Marlborough in Lyddy: A Tale of the Old South (1898)

Bacon's novel Lyddy: A Tale of the Old South was originally published in 1898 by Continental Pub. Co. Bacon was reportedly motivated to write the novel after the daughter of her dinner hosts, who had read Uncle Tom's Cabin, began crying after learning Bacon had been a slaveowner.

Lyddy is set in Siberty County, Georgia (a fictionalized version Bacon's' native Liberty County) during the Antebellum period and depicts a romance between two slaves: Marlborough, a coachman; and Lyddy, a nurse. Research by Lucinda H. MacKethan suggests that many of the novels's characters, including Marlborough, were based on real people whom Bacon had known during her childhood. The real Marlborough (also spelled Marlboro) was enslaved by the Jones family and served in the Confederate Army during the American Civil War. The character Parson C.C. was likely based on Charles Colcock Jones.

An example of Anti-Tom literature, Lyddy presents a fictional and romanticized version of slavery and plantation life in the Southern United States prior to the abolition of slavery. The novel promotes the ideas of slavery as a positive good and the lost cause of the Confederacy.

In 1998, Lyddy was republished by the University of Georgia Press with an introduction by MacKethan.
