= H. K. Edgerton =

American NAACP leader and Confederate History Activist

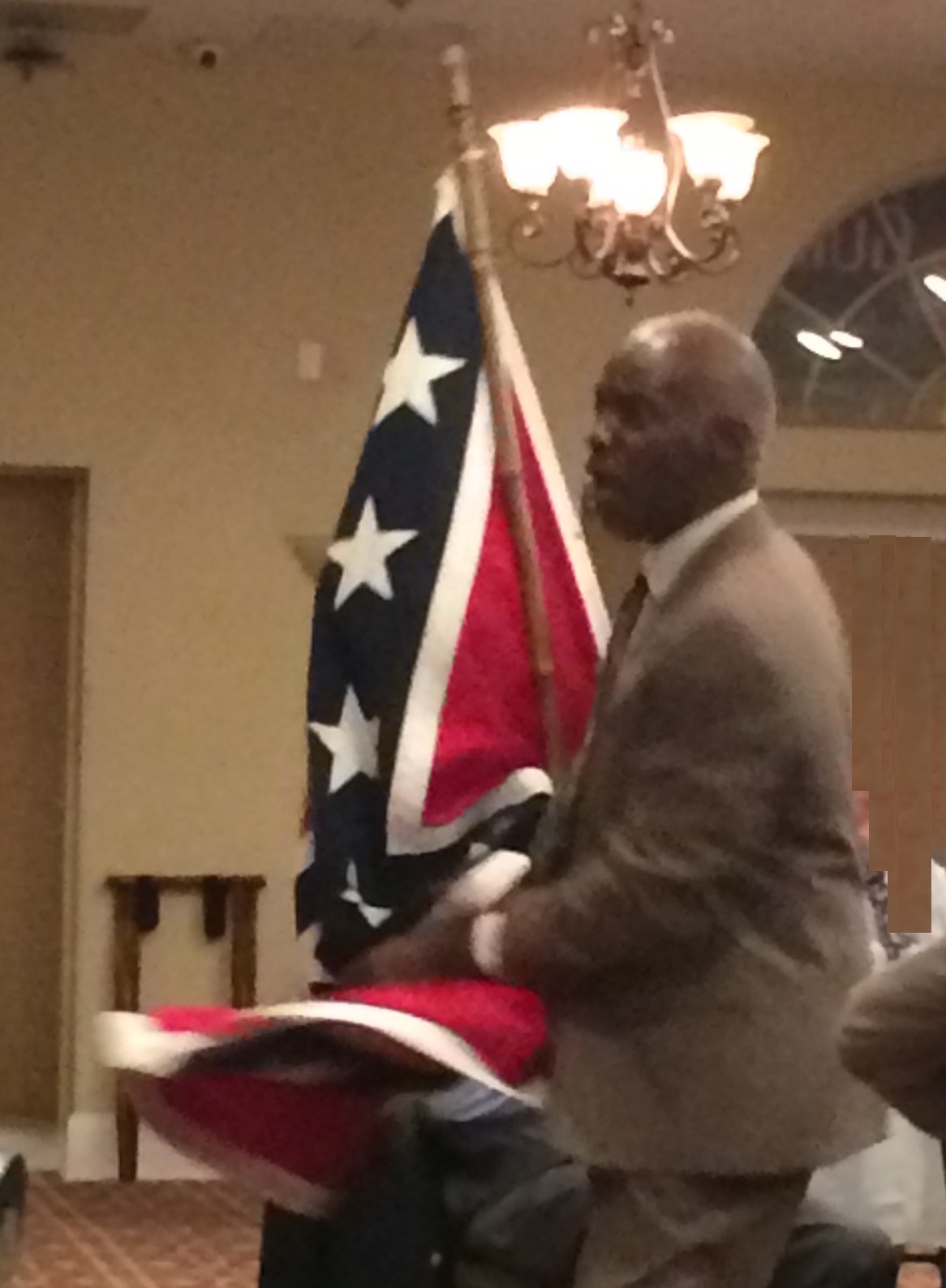
- Edgerton reciting a Civil War poem during a Sons of Confederate Veterans and United Daughters of the Confederacy meeting in Tampa, Florida
- Born: Harold Kenneth Edgerton; February 18, 1948; Asheville, North Carolina, U.S.
- Died: January 18, 2026 (aged 77); Asheville, North Carolina, U.S.
- Occupation: Activist
- Known for: Advocate of the Lost Cause and the Confederate flag
- Father: Roger Roland Edgerton

Harold Kenneth Edgerton (February 18, 1948 – January 18, 2026) was an American civil rights activist known for his defense of the Lost Cause of the Confederacy and the Confederate battle flag. An African-American member of the Sons of Confederate Veterans, Edgerton formerly served as president of the Asheville, North Carolina chapter of the National Association for the Advancement of Colored People (NAACP), and was Chairman Board of Advisors Emeritus of the Southern Legal Resource Center.

== Biography ==
=== Early life and education ===
Harold Kenneth Edgerton was born in Asheville, North Carolina on February 18, 1948, the son of Roger Roland Edgerton (1917–1994), a Baptist minister, and Annabelle (née Robinson). He graduated from Asheville High School in 1967 and from the University of Minnesota in 1976 with a Bachelor of Science degree. While in college, he was Chairman of the Board of the United Way Agency that was responsible for running the Sabathani Community Center in South Minneapolis. He founded the University of Minnesota Black Student Center and served on the Student Regent Board of Directors.

=== Career ===
Edgerton served as an intern for the Green Giant Company, Customer Service Engineer for International Business Machines (IBM), and later he and his brother Terry Lee owned and operated Edgerton and Edgerton Office Products in Fullerton, California from 1981 to 1989. He later consulted with APAC, a Fortune 500 company. He returned to Asheville, North Carolina to serve his hometown in various roles after his retirement including serving as Chairman of the Program Planning and Implementation Committee for the Asheville-Buncombe County Drug Commission.

He was a supporter and leader of youth sports and education, including being a volunteer and founder of the Boys and Girls Golf Team at Shiloh Community Center in Asheville and volunteer coach at Oakley Middle School for girls and boys basketball. He also served as a teacher's aide at Ira B. Jones Elementary School.

Edgerton worked for improving racial issues through the Asheville chapter of the NAACP, where he served tenures first as Vice President and later as President. He also conducted a bid for Mayor of the City of Asheville.

=== Activism ===
Edgerton was best known for his defense of the Southern Confederate cause. "Brother H.K.", as he was affectionately known, was widely respected by many in the Confederate heritage community as a proud African-American member of the Sons of Confederate Veterans, which often featured him at events. By 2000, Edgerton was appointed the chairman of the board of directors of the Southern Legal Resource Center, headed by Kirk Lyons. He gained international recognition during his Historical March Across Dixie, which began in Asheville in 2002 at the now-removed Vance Monument and culminated January 26, 2003 in Austin, Texas. Edgerton brought attention to the decision by then-Governor George W. Bush to remove historic plaques from the Texas Supreme Court Building by marching donned in the uniform of a Confederate soldier carrying the Confederate battle flag. He frequently appeared in the news and in May 2006 was featured on Penn and Teller's show Bullshit!.

Edgerton was a plaintiff in several lawsuits including against the U.S. Army to prevent the removal of the Reconciliation Memorial at Arlington National Cemetery. He authored an Open Letter and Report on his activities for two decades and was a frequent public speaker on Southern history.

Edgerton was widely acclaimed for his efforts in defense of Confederate heritage and received the Key to the City of Carthage, Texas and the Key to the City of Toccoa, Georgia; the Horace L. Hunley Award from the Sons of Confederate Veterans (SCV); the Gen. Robert E. Lee Medal from the Virginia Division of the SCV; the Jefferson Davis Medal from the Texas Division of the UDC; the John F. Harris Award from the Mississippi Division of the SCV; and a Lifetime Achievement Award (2022) from the North Carolina Order of the Confederate Rose, among others.

In January 2009, he walked from North Carolina to Washington, D.C. seeking "official U.S. government recognition of the Confederate battle flag as a symbol of Southern heritage" from the new administration. Later in 2009, Edgerton threatened a lawsuit regarding newly elected Asheville City Council Member Cecil Bothwell, on the basis that Bothwell's atheism rendered him ineligible to serve in North Carolina public office. In 2021, H.K. voiced his strong opposition to what he considered the illegal destruction of the Vance Monument that had been the starting point of his famous march nearly 20 years prior.

Edgerton was a member of numerous organizations including the Southern Legal Resource Center (where he was Chairman Board of Advisors Emeritus), Save Southern Heritage Florida, Veterans Defending Arlington, and Honorary Scots of Austin. He was also appointed an Honorary Life Member of many chapters of the SCV, UDC, and Order of the Confederate Rose throughout the Southern United States in recognition of his lifelong activism in defense of Confederate history and heritage.

=== Death ===
Edgerton died on January 18, 2026 in Asheville following a prolonged illness.

== See also ==
- Nelson W. Winbush, another African-American member of the Sons of Confederate Veterans
- Georgia Benton, African-American member of the United Daughters of the Confederacy
- Mattie Clyburn Rice, African-American member of the United Daughters of the Confederacy
