= Georgia Benton =

American schoolteacher and historian

Georgia W. Benton is an American schoolteacher, businesswoman, and historian. In 2013, she became the first African-American member of the United Daughters of the Confederacy in Georgia.

== Early life ==
Benton was born and raised in Savannah, Georgia. She grew up during racial segregation. Her great-grandfather, George W. Washington, was an enslaved man from Sumter, South Carolina who served as a body servant to his enslaver's son, Lieutenant William Alexander McQueen, from 1862 to the last days of the American Civil War, seeing the Battle of Antietam, the Battle of Gettysburg, and the Siege of Petersburg. As a child, she paid annual visits to her great-grandfather's gravesite, a four-foot high obelisk in Walker Cemetery.

== Career ==
As a young woman, she was involved in the Civil rights movement in Port Wentworth, Georgia.

Benton worked as a mathematics teacher in the Savannah-Chatham County Public Schools System. She taught in Chatham and Effingham County schools for over thirty years. After retiring from teaching, she opened a tax and accounting service.

Benton is a court-appointed special advocate for abused and neglected children. She is also the historian for First Bryan Baptist Church.

=== United Daughters of the Confederacy ===
In 2013, Benton applied to join the United Daughters of the Confederacy, a lineage society that promotes the pseudohistorical Lost Cause narrative, submitting proof of her lineage to Washington and proof of his military service using her family bible, his gravestone, birth records, marriage records, death records, and census records. Her application was accepted in October 2013, making her the first African-American member of the Savannah Chapter and the only African-American member in the Georgia division of the United Daughters of the Confederacy. She was inducted into the organization's Second Savannah Chapter by the chapter's president, Elizabeth Piechocinski, on December 14, 2013, during a Christmas luncheon.

== Personal life ==
Benton lives in Savannah, Georgia and has five children. She is Baptist and attends First Bryan Baptist Church.

== See also ==
- Mattie Clyburn Rice, African-American member of the United Daughters of the Confederacy
- H. K. Edgerton, African-American member of Sons of Confederate Veterans
- Nelson W. Winbush, African-American member of Sons of Confederate Veterans
