= Weary =

Weary is a name, and may refer to:

- Weary Clyburn (1841–1930), American slave
- Cotton Weary, fictional character in the Scream franchise
- Frank O. Weary (1849–1921), American architect
- Fred Weary (defensive back) (born 1974), former American football cornerback
- Fred Weary (offensive lineman) (born 1977), American football guard
- Jake Weary (born 1990), American actor, musician, singer-songwriter and music producer
- Emily Pohl-Weary (born 1973), Canadian novelist, professor and editor
