= Nelson W. Winbush =

American educator

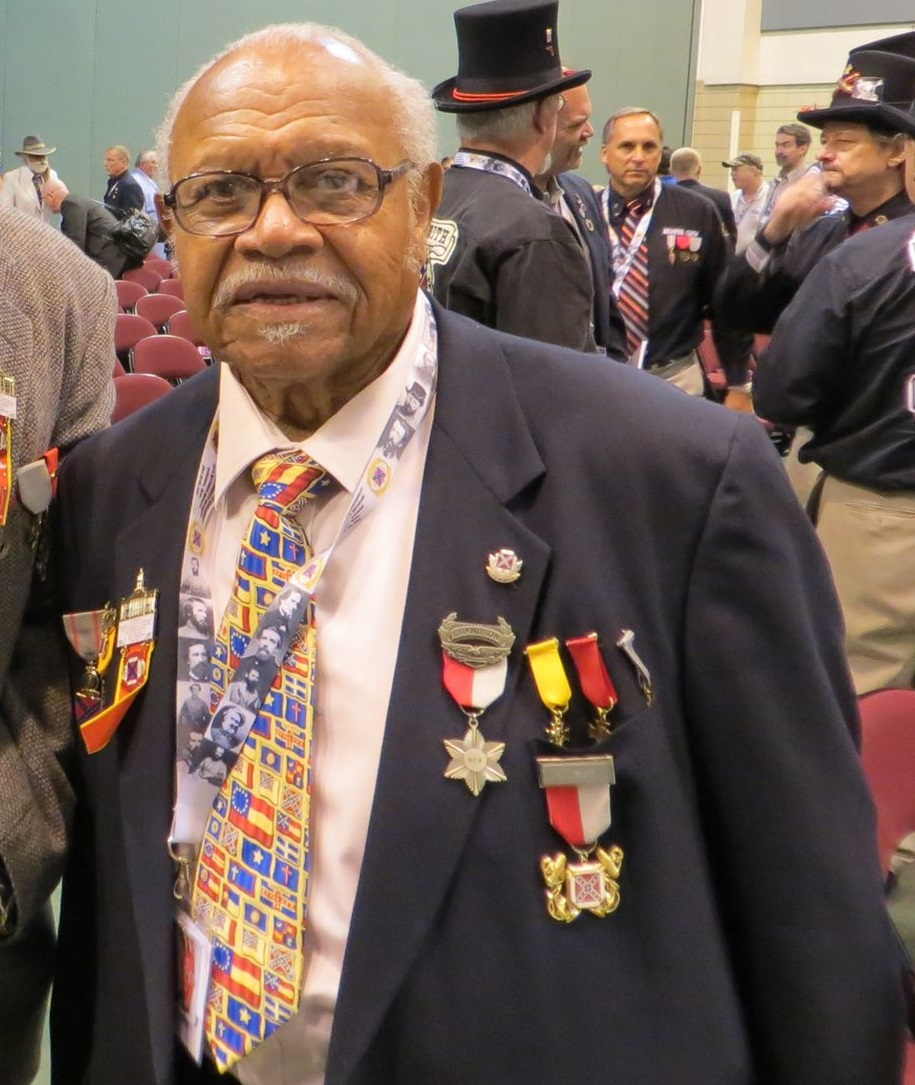
- Winbush at the 2013 Sons of Confederate Veterans Reunion in Vicksburg, Mississippi.
- Born: 1929 (age 96–97); Ripley, Tennessee, U.S.
- Education: University of Tennessee (BS, MPE)
- Occupations: educator activist
- Spouse: Naomi Daniel
- Children: 2

Nelson Wyman Winbush (born 1929) is an American educator and Civil War historian. He is one of a few African-American members of the Sons of Confederate Veterans and is known for his controversial views, such as his support of the modern display of the Confederate flag.

== Early life and education ==
Winbush was born in Ripley, Tennessee, in the Mississippi Delta region, to Isaac and Ganelle Nelson Winbush. His siblings included brothers Robert and Harold, and sisters Mary and Dorothy Jean. His family grew up in the house built in 1908 by his maternal grandfather Louis Napoleon Nelson. As Nelson lived until 1934, Winbush had a few years as a young boy to absorb his vivid first-person accounts of slavery and service as an enslaved person under his enslavers, ER and Sidney Oldham, while the brothers served in the Confederate States Army during the American Civil War.

=== Louis Napoleon Nelson, grandfather ===
Louis Napoleon Nelson (1847–1934) was an enslaved cook and body servant during the American Civil War. In 1862, Louis was a 14-year-old illiterate slave on James and Helen C. Oldham's plantation in Lauderdale County, Tennessee.

The Oldhams were a prominent Episcopalian family who owned over 40 slaves. Nelson was one of 19 enslaved children under the age of 16 on the plantation according to the United States Census (1860 Slave Schedule). James and Helen had 3 sons, E.R. (18), Sidney (16), and James (12).

==== Experience during the Civil War ====
E.R. and Sidney enlisted in Company M, Tennessee 7th Cavalry (Duckworth’s) in April 1862. At 14 years old, Louis' owner sent him to serve as a personal servant for his sons. Based on the memoir of a member of Company M, Charles Stephen Olin Rice, the Oldham sons brought along another slave named Auterick.

As a Confederate slave, Louis was responsible for duties such as cooking breakfast, cleaning, brushing uniforms, taking care of horses, foraging for food, shaving, delivering messages or any other task the owner needed. Sometimes slaves were also allowed to hire out their services if their owner permitted.

Company M was one of many Confederate cavalry formations that fell under the overall command of the noted slave trader, planter and Confederate cavalry Lieutenant General, Nathan Bedford Forrest.

Louis later served as a cook for Company M, but there is no record of how this service came about. It is unknown whether Louis was hired out by E.R. Oldham to the Confederate Army or ever received pay for his labor during this time.

==== Lore about Louis' life ====
In Winbush's speeches and writing he frequently discusses Nelson. Winbush claims that Nelson was allowed to serve as a rifleman and later as chaplain to both blacks and whites; he had already memorized the King James Bible by heart.

In a 2007 Florida Today interview, Winbush stated that his grandfather served as a chaplain in 1862 after the Battle of Shiloh for 4 campaigns. There are no sources which corroborate any of these claims.

In contrast to the story that Winbush tells his grandfather was quoted in a June 6, 1929 Charlotte Observer article entitled, "Forrest's valet admits Lee and Jackson were good too".

"I looked a’ter dem houses when Cap’n Bedford wuzn’t ridin’ em an’ when he wasn’t too close to de fightin’. I always stayed as far away from de fightin’ as I could an’ wit’ all dat. I had to do some powerful good runnin’ ever now an’ den. " - Louis Napoleon Nelson

The September 10, 1863, issue of The Religious Herald is often used to bolster Louis' bonafides as the first black chaplain of the CSA. The story, which was reprinted in several newspapers, notes that a Confederate Tennessee regiment did not have a chaplain, but instead had services led by an "old negro" slave named "Uncle Lewis". Louis Nelson would have been around 15 years old at this time. Company M is not named in the articles. This lore directly contradicts the reality of the CSA's racial dynamics.

But were African American laborers in the Confederate army formally enlisted in the army, equipped with uniforms, arms, and accoutrements, and paid for their own work, as were African Americans in the U.S. Army? No. Their status was that of enslaved or marginally free laborers serving in capacities in a military setting analogous to their roles in civilian life. Referring to such men as “soldiers” ignores a fundamental distinction between forced labor and military service. - Jim Coski, American Civil War Museum

The CSA did not allow blacks to enlist and as a policy did not arm them. Confederate Army Regulations from 1861 to 1865 state that soldiers must be "free white males" and cannot be "the servant of a soldier". The first black soldiers enlisted in the CSA in March 1865 just a few weeks before the war's end and Louis was not in this number. Oldham and the rest of Company M surrendered in Gainesville, Alabama on May 12, 1865.

==== Pension records ====
E.R. Oldham served as a witness for Louis' pension application. E.R. Oldham wrote that Louis was there until the very end of the war and was "my cook, while I was a soldier". All existing records classify Louis as a cook and servant. Louis' pension application and obituary were absent of any mention of duties as a chaplain, rifleman or soldier.

His widow was denied pension as the State of Tennessee only paid a pension to veterans, their widows, and ex-servants, but not to the widows of ex-servants.

As a descendant of Nelson, Winbush qualified for membership in the Sons of Confederate Veterans. He notes that his grandfather received a state pension from Tennessee for Confederate veterans beginning in 1921 according to his pension records. 1921 was the first year that black cooks and servants were allowed to file.

==== Legacy ====
Louis was one of more than 280 men who appeared before the Tennessee pension board to receive the pension created to "provide for those colored men who served as servants and cooks in the Confederate Army.”

Not every cook or servant qualified for a pension. Eligibility requirements included an inability to support oneself and proof they stayed in the war until the end. The pension paid $10 a month.

White Confederate veterans received pensions in 1891 (about 26 years after the war) and their widows first received pensions in 1905.

The majority of former Confederate slaves died before the pension bill passed in 1921, which was about 56 years after the war ended. The average age of black pensioners in Tennessee in 1921 was 79.9 years old. At 74, Louis was one of 195 men to receive a pension for being a cook or servant.

== Family ==
Both Winbush's mother Ganelle and his maternal grandmother were teachers, and education was prized in their family. Winbush and his siblings all earned college degrees and some, like his sister Mary, also earned graduate degrees. She became a teacher and principal.

Winbush married Naomi Daniel of Mound Bayou, Mississippi. Mrs. Winbush passed in 1999. They have two children, five grandchildren and two great-grandchildren.

== Career ==
Winbush became a teacher and later an assistant principal, having a career in education like his mother and grandmother. In 1955, he moved with his family to Florida where the public school system resisted integration and retained segregated schools for years past the US Supreme Court ruling of Brown v. Board of Education (1954) that declared them unconstitutional.

He earned an undergraduate degree in science and a master's degree in physical education from the University of Tennessee.

== Opinions on Confederate history ==
=== Membership in Sons of Confederate Veterans ===
In 1991, after the NAACP began a campaign against the Confederate flag being celebrated on public buildings, Winbush disagreed with such sentiment and efforts, and decided to join the Sons of Confederate Veterans. He is a member of the Sons of Confederate Veterans, Jacob Summerlin Camp #1516 in Kissimmee, Florida.

In the article, "In defense of his Confederate pride" which appeared in the Tampa Bay Times, highlighting Winbush, one young SCV member is quoted as saying Winbush's story "wipes out" the whole "segregation and racism argument", describing the Winbush's story as a way to neutralize critique of the Confederacy. The same article notes that, Winbush's comments sound like they could be coming from "the mouth of any white son of the Confederate veterans".

Winbush has traveled widely, visiting various SCV camps and other organizations willing to listen and consider his views about the Civil War and his heritage. He has been known to sing a Confederate song including the line, "....Black is nothing other than a darker shade of rebel gray."

=== Opinions on Emancipation Proclamation ===
With his retirement from teaching, Winbush felt ready to speak out on public issues. For instance, unlike many other African Americans, he considers the Confederate flag part of Southern heritage and appropriate for public display. He has said that the South seceded from the Union because of states' rights, not slavery. He denies that President Lincoln freed the slaves, explaining that the Emancipation Proclamation affected only the Confederate states, which were no longer under his authority. He then followed the statement up to say that it was just an exercise in rhetoric. As a counterpoint to this view, trained historians note that Lincoln never acknowledged the South's right to secede from the Union and therefore the Emancipation Proclamation provided the framework to free enslaved people once the areas came under Northern control.

=== Interview with Edward C. Smith, Black Southern Heritage ===
In 1998, Winbush participated in making a video on Black Southern Heritage, directed by Edward Smith of American University, who is also an African-American SCV member. The video covers his grandfather's Confederate military service and qualification for a Confederate pension after the war, as well as elements of other African-American heritage. Edward C. Smith's work has critiqued because he is not a trained historian. His work often incorrectly states "somewhere around "50,000 black men fought as combatants" and that the Confederate monument at the Arlington National Cemetery represents evidence of Black Confederate soldiers. Smith has made these claims since the early mid-1990s, but has never provided evidence.

=== Community reactions ===
The NAACP and similar organizations have criticized Winbush for his support of what they believe are neo-Confederate causes; they think he misunderstands the history of the South. That idea may be fueled by statements Winbush makes in interviews which largely go without fact-checking. In one such interview with the Tampa Bay Times, Winbush stated, "People ask why a black person would fight for the Confederacy. (It was) for the same damned reason a white Southerner did." Like Edward C. Smith, Winbush has never produced evidence to support this claims. The claim that his grandfather was a private in the Confederate army was a regular feature in his earlier interviews.

Most of Winbush's interviews include no pushback based on historical accuracy, one rare departure from that style is an interview that appeared in the Orlando Sentinel, August 18, 2004. His usual responses were paired with local black author and former librarian of 30 years, Mary L. Fears. Fears wrote, "Contrary to published accounts, the service of body servants was not given as 'loyal patriotism to the cause of the Southerners.' When told to go, the slaves, compelled to follow their owners' orders, went to military camps. While in camp, they remained 'slaves' and, in that position, they were forced to obey their masters, no matter where they were. They were sometimes given uniforms and photographed with their slave masters, turned Confederate soldiers. To fail to obey, or show any signs of possible non-compliance, or even the slightest insinuation that they favored a Union victory, led to suffering from immediate punishment.

== See also ==
- Black Confederate soldiers, military history of African Americans in the American Civil War
- Lost Cause, the "loyal slave" is one of the central tenets
- H. K. Edgerton, African-American activist for Southern heritage and an African-American member of the Sons of Confederate Veterans
- Mattie Clyburn Rice, African-American member of the United Daughters of the Confederacy
- Georgia Benton, African-American member of the United Daughters of the Confederacy
