= Jefferson Shields =

American slave

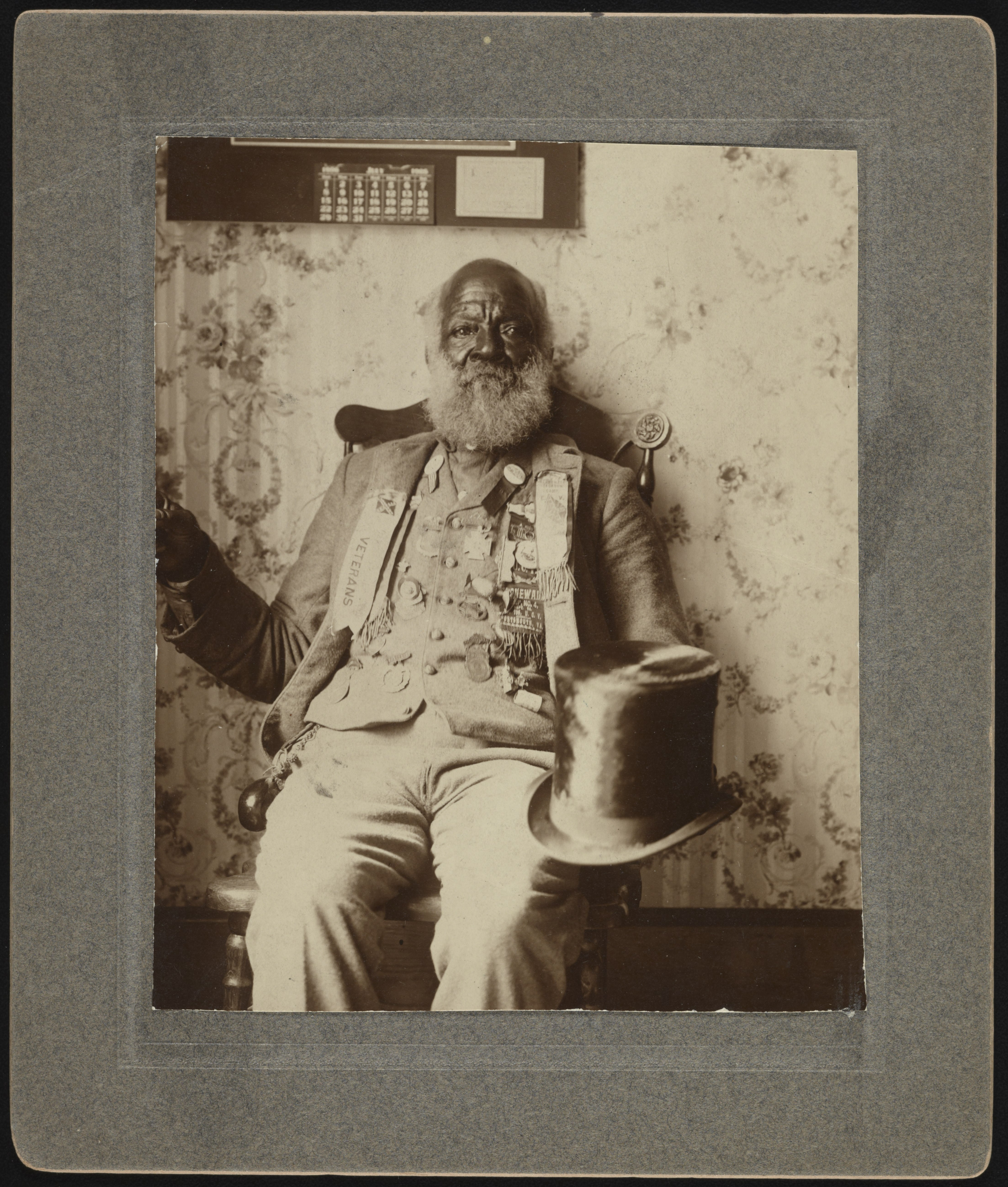
- Shields in Confederate uniform
- Born: August 25, 1829; Lexington, Virginia, U.S.
- Died: April 4, 1918 (aged 88); Lexington, Virginia, U.S.
- Resting place: Evergreen Cemetery
- Occupation: slave
- Spouse: Mary Ann McNutt

Jefferson Shields (August 25, 1829 – April 4, 1918) was an American slave who was a body servant to Confederate Colonel James Kerr Edmondson during the American Civil War.

== Civil War ==
Shields was not enlisted in the Confederate Army as African Americans were not permitted to serve in the Confederacy. During the war, he was a cook for his enslaver's son, James Kerr Edmonston, who later became a colonel in the 27th Virginia Infantry Regiment. He claimed to have cooked for other Confederate officers during the war as well, including General Stonewall Jackson and General J. E. B. Stuart.

== Post-war and legacy ==
Following the war, Shields attended many veterans reunions and was voted in as a member of the Stonewall Brigade at a reunion in Staunton, Virginia and was permitted to wear one of the Brigade's badges. He embraced this role, promoting the pseudo-historical Lost Cause of the Confederacy.

He was a trustee of First Baptist Church in Lexington, Virginia.

Following his death in 1918, Shields was buried with a military grave marker at Evergreen Cemetery in Lexington, Virginia. His headstone reads "Jefferson Shields, Pvt. Co. H 27th Va. Inf., Stonewall Brigade, Confederate States Army" despite him not actually serving in the military. The Sons of Confederate Veterans posthumously awarded Shields the honorary rank of private decades after his death. He, along with other "black Confederates" such as Weary Clyburn, William Mack Lee, and Marlboro Jones, helped to reinforce the stereotype of the "happy slave" narrative according to historian Kevin M. Levin.
