= Marlboro Jones =

American slave

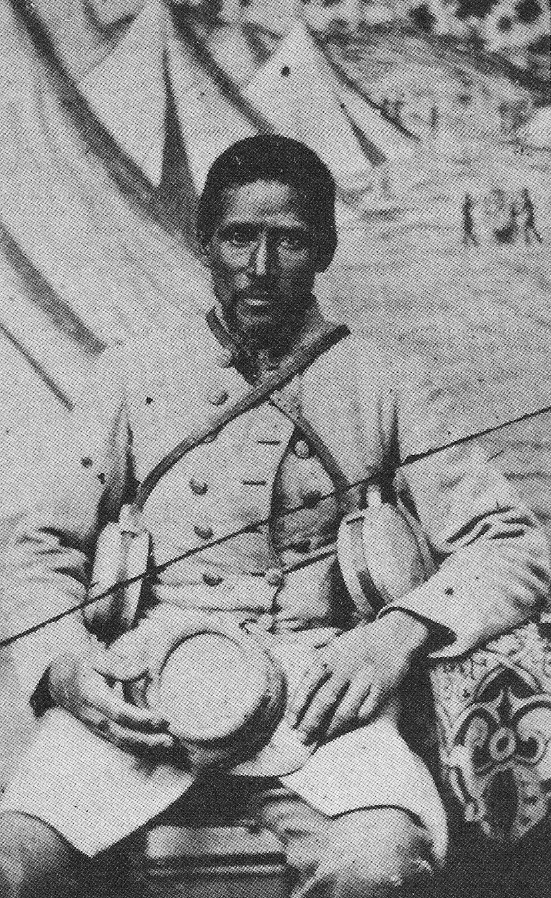
- Jones in Confederate uniform
- Born: Georgia, U.S.
- Died: Georgia, U.S.
- Occupation: slave

Marlboro Jones was an American slave who was a body servant to Confederate Captain Randal F. Jones during the American Civil War.

== Civil War ==
Jones accompanied his enslaver, Captain Randal F. Jones, during the American Civil War. He was not enlisted in the Confederate Army, as African Americans were not permitted to serve in the Confederacy, instead performing the duties of a manservant to Captain Jones, who was an officer in the 7th Georgia Cavalry. In June 1864, his enslaver was motally wounded during the Battle of Trevilian Station in Virginia, so Jones brought him back home to Savannah, Georgia.

== Legacy ==
Jones was the inspiration for the character Marlborough in Eugenia Jones Bacon's 1898 pro-slavery novel Lyddy: A Tale of the Old South.

== See also ==
- Weary Clyburn
- William Mack Lee
- Jefferson Shields
