= Francis Trevelyan Miller =

American film director

Francis Trevelyan Miller (October 8, 1877 – November 7, 1959) was an American writer and filmmaker.

He is known for his books about exploration, travel and photography. He wrote many books about the American Civil War, including The Photographic History of the Civil War, in Ten Volumes (New York: The Review of Reviews Co., 1912). He also wrote History of WWII: Armed Services Memorial Edition.

He made several feature films and wrote the screenplay for the 1919 film Deliverance, about Helen Keller. In 1955 his photograph of children at a Chicago funfair was selected by Edward Steichen for MoMA's world-touring The Family of Man exhibition.

== Early life and education ==
Francis Trevelyan Miller was born on October 8, 1877, in Southington, Connecticut. His mother, Jane A. Hull, was involved in the Woman's Christian Temperance Union and active in the women's suffrage movement in Connecticut. She was a descendant of the first settlers in Southington. His father, Elijah Hutchinson Miller, was a businessman in New York and Connecticut. The Miller family settled in North America during the 17th century, living in Lynn, Massachusetts, before establishing Long Island's Miller Place in 1649. Francis Trevelyan Miller was a direct descendent of William Bradford, the governor of Plymouth Colony.

Miller had three siblings. His brother Wallace was a journalist who served as editor of The Bristol Press for over 25 years. His sister Lanette was an artist who worked as an illustrator for the Meriden Journal. Lanette was married to J. Herbert Foster, the owner of a rubber plantation in Mexico. Following her death, Foster married Miller's other sister Grace.

=== Education ===
During his childhood, Miller moved from Southington to Meriden, Connecticut. He studied at Trinity College before receiving a law degree from Washington and Lee University.

At one point, he worked alongside his father at the Rubber Alphabet Company in Meriden.

== Writing career ==
From 1902 to 1908, Miller served as editor of the magazine The Connecticut.

In 1910, he edited the ten-volume book The Photographic History of the Civil War.

== Personal life ==
Miller's first wife was Clara E. Emerson-Bickford and his second was Ann Woodward. He had two daughters, Virginia and Lanette.

Miller died at Greenwich Hospital on November 7, 1959.
