= First Baptist Church (Lexington, Virginia) =

Historic church in Virginia, US

- First Baptist Church-Lexington
- U.S. National Register of Historic Places
- Virginia Landmarks Register
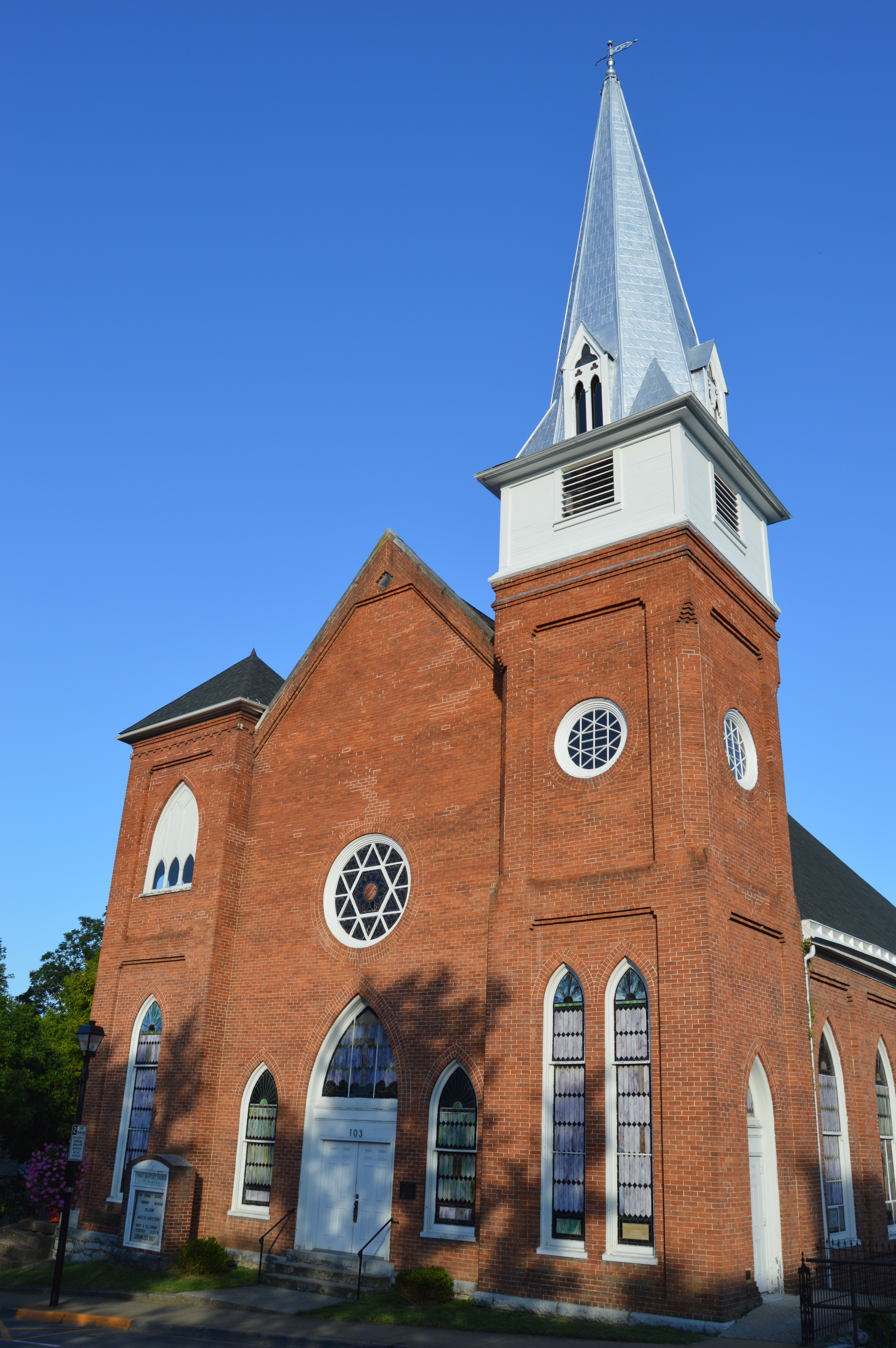
- Front of the church

- Location within Virginia Location within the United States
- Location: 103 N. Main St., Lexington, Virginia
- Coordinates: 37°47′10″N 79°26′26″W
- Area: 0.4 acres (0.16 ha)
- Built: 1894-1896
- Architect: E.N. Bogher, R. Jones, Irk Poindexter, the Moores, Carl Barckhoff
- Architectural style: Gothic Revival
- NRHP reference No.: 06000757
- VLR No.: 117-0027-0063

Significant dates
- Added to NRHP: August 30, 2006
- Designated VLR: June 8, 2006

First Baptist Church, originally known as Lexington African Baptist Church, is a historic Baptist church building in the city of Lexington, Virginia, United States. It was built between 1894 and 1896, and is a large brick church on a limestone basement in the Gothic Revival style. It has a front gable roof, round and lancet-arch stained glass windows, and towers at its two front corners. The right hand tower has a belfry and spire. The interior consists of a barrel-vaulted auditorium with a gallery on turned posts and the basement has classroom and meeting spaces. Historically First Baptist played a central role in the life of Lexington's African-American community. Former slave Jefferson Shields was a trustee of the church.

It was listed on the National Register of Historic Places in 2006.
