= Southern Legal Resource Center =

American nonprofit legal center

- Founded: 1996; 30 years ago
- Founder: Carl A. Barrington; Kirk David Lyons; Larry Norman; Lourie A. Salley III
- Type: Public-interest law firm; Civil rights advocacy org
- Tax ID no.: 56-1924497
- Purpose: Southern heritage
- Location: Black Mountain, North Carolina, US
- Region served: United States
- Product: Legal representation
- Website: www.slrc-csa.org

The Southern Legal Resource Center, Inc. (SLRC) is a non-profit and public law corporation in South Carolina which offers legal support to defend what they see as First Amendment violations, violation of civil rights, or "discrimination against advocates of southern heritage".

== History ==
In 2004 the SLRC hired advertising executive and Southern activist Roger McCredie as its full-time executive director. Under McCredie the organization doubled the size of its board of directors, increased its advertising program and undertook an ambitious five-year growth and development plan.

== SLRC advocacy ==
The SLRC has supported the rights of students to use and display Confederate symbols. Its most significant victory was Castorina v. Madison County Schools, in which the United States Court of Appeals for the Sixth Circuit in 2001 overturned a federal district court's ruling in favor of a Kentucky school board's ban on student displays of Confederate symbols, and remanded the case for further proceedings.

== Criticism ==
The SLRC has drawn fire from the Southern Poverty Law Center (SPLC), which has frequently attacked the SLRC by citing Lyons' pre-SLRC defense of some controversial right-wing figures such as Aryan Nations members, White Aryan Resistance founder Tom Metzger and Lyons' 1990 marriage to the sister of jailed Order defendant David Tate. The SPLC also criticized Lyons tie to Deborah Davila's FBI espionage case.

In addition the SPLC has called Southern Legal's fundraising practices "deceitful" citing, for example, "the SLRC Web site detailed two disputes under a headline that read 'Cases Pending,' implying that the SLRC represented the parties involved. In both cases, the plaintiff's families say Lyons actually did very little for them."

== "Confederate Southern Americans" ==
The SLRC called on "Confederate Southern Americans" to identify as a separate race on the 2010 United States census form.
