= Uriah Plantation =

Plantation in Kershaw, South Carolina

- Alternative names: Clyburn Plantation; Thomas L. Clyburn House

General information
- Type: plantation house
- Location: 5082 Gold Mine Highway; Kershaw, South Carolina, U.S.
- Coordinates: 34.5863°N 80.5497°W
- Owner: Clyburn family

The Uriah Plantation, also known as the Clyburn Plantation and the Thomas L. Clyburn House, is a historic plantation house in Kershaw, South Carolina.

== History ==
The plantation once belonged to Thomas Lorenzo Clyburn, who lived in Lancaster County as early as 1831. His son, William Uriah Clyburn, became the plantation owner in 1869.

The current house was built in 1876.

The plantation was the birthplace of former slave Weary Clyburn.
