= Weary Clyburn =

American former slave

- Clyburn in 1913
- Born: 1841; Lancaster County, South Carolina, U.S.
- Died: March 30, 1930 (aged 88–89); Union County, North Carolina, U.S.
- Occupation: slave
- Spouse(s): Viney Moore; Eliza Brown
- Children: Mattie Clyburn Rice

Weary D. Clyburn (1841–1930) was an American slave who was a body servant to a Confederate States Army officer during the American Civil War. Despite the fact that African-Americans were not permitted to serve in the Confederate military, Clyburn is recognized as a Confederate veteran by the United Daughters of the Confederacy and Sons of Confederate Veterans.

== Birth ==
Clyburn was born enslaved on the Uriah Plantation in Lancaster County, South Carolina.

== Civil War ==
During the American Civil War, Clyburn was a body servant to his enslaver, Captain Thomas Frank Clyburn, who was serving in the 12th South Carolina Infantry Regiment of the Confederate States Army. Clyburn was present at the Battle of Port Royal at Hilton Head Island and carried Captain Clyburn out of the field on his shoulder. Later, he performed personal service for General Robert E. Lee. Clyburn, like other slaves, did not serve the Confederate army willingly, but was forced to serve in the army by his enslaver.

Following the war, he attended gatherings for Confederate veterans.

== Personal life and death ==
In 1922, Clyburn moved to Union County, North Carolina. He was married multiple times and had multiple children, including Mattie Clyburn Rice.

In 1926, he applied for a Confederate military pension.

He was known to be a violinist and an expert marksman.

Clyburn died in Union County on March 30, 1930. He was buried in Methodist Cemetery, now part of Hillcrest Cemetery in Monroe. The Sons of Confederate Veterans honored him with a ceremony at his grave and he is a qualifying patriot ancestor for the United Daughters of the Confederacy.

== See also ==
- Marlboro Jones
- William Mack Lee
- Jefferson Shields
