= Bell I. Wiley =

American historian

Bell Irvin Wiley (January 5, 1906 – April 4, 1980) was an American historian who specialized in the American Civil War and was an authority on military history and the social history of common people. He died in Atlanta, Georgia, from a heart attack.

== Early life and career ==
Wiley earned a B.A. at Asbury College in 1928, a master's degree at the University of Kentucky, and a Ph.D. from Yale University in 1933, where he worked under Ulrich B. Phillips. In 1934 Wiley became a professor of history at State Teachers College (now the University of Southern Mississippi). He married Mary Frances Harrison in 1937; they had two children. He served as professor of history at the University of Mississippi (1938–1943), Louisiana State University (1946–1949), and Emory University (1949–1974).

Born in rural Halls, Tennessee, Wiley was one of 13 children, 11 of whom lived past infancy. The family did farm work, and Wiley had the experience of plowing behind a mule. His dislike for the drudgery of farm chores and the merciless Southern heat motivated him to plan a career in education.

Wiley's maternal grandfather had marched with the Army of Tennessee, fighting against Union General William Tecumseh Sherman’s army. While he barely remembered him, Wiley spent several summers as a boy with his widow, who often held him spellbound with her recollections of the period. Wiley's family frequently hosted both a Confederate and a Union soldier, who would entertain them with their accounts of what they experienced when each had opposed the other in battle.

== Legacy ==
A historian writing in 1967 commented, "Since the publication of Bell Wiley's Southern Negroes, 1861–1865 in 1938, historians have known that the moonlight and magnolia idea of loyal slaves, who cheerfully supported the masters who fought to keep them enslaved, is a myth. Every teacher of survey courses knows, however, that this myth dies hard."

The New York Civil War Round Table awards the Bell I. Wiley Award to deserving authors who write about Civil War themes.
