= The Richmond Review =

- The last issue of The Richmond Review
- Type: Biweekly community newspaper
- Format: Tabloid
- Owner(s): Black Press (pre 2015); Glacier Media (2015)
- Founder: Bill Carruthers
- Publisher: Pierre Pelletier
- Editor: Bhreandain Clugston
- Staff writers: Jeff Nagel; Martin van den Hemel; Matthew Hoekstra; Don Fennell
- Founded: April 1, 1932; 94 years ago
- Ceased publication: July 24, 2015; 11 years ago
- Language: Canadian English
- Headquarters: Richmond, British Columbia
- City: Richmond
- Country: Canada
- Circulation: 43,100 (as of 2015)
- Sister newspapers: Richmond News (2015)
- ISSN: 1186-4834
- Website: www.richmondreview.com (former)

The Richmond Review was a twice-weekly community newspaper based in Richmond, British Columbia, Canada. Founded in 1932, the newspaper served the local community for 83 years before ceasing operations in July 2015 due to corporate consolidation and changing media environments.

By the 1970s, it had grown to become British Columbia's largest circulating biweekly newspaper. At its closure, its vast collection of historical photographs and print archives was transferred to the City of Richmond Archives.

== History ==
The newspaper published its inaugural edition on April 1, 1932. It was launched by founder Bill Carruthers during the height of the Great Depression. After publishing only a few issues, Carruthers sold the business to Ethel Tibbits, a pioneering female editor and publisher in British Columbia, who managed the newspaper from 1932 until 1948.

For a significant portion of its history, the publication operated under the name Marpole-Richmond Review, expanding its reach to the adjacent Marpole neighborhood in Vancouver. The newspaper experienced significant growth throughout the mid-20th century, emerging as the largest biweekly newspaper by circulation in British Columbia during the 1970s.

== Final years and closure ==
During its later years, ownership of the paper shifted several times during an era of heavy consolidation in Canadian community media. For many years it was published by Black Press. In early 2015, Glacier Media acquired the Richmond Review as part of a multi-paper asset swap with Black Press.

The acquisition placed the Richmond Review under the same corporate umbrella as its primary, long-standing local competitor, the Richmond News. Citing unsustainable market forces and the financial strain of operating two competing local publications in the same municipality, Glacier Media announced the closure of the paper in July 2015. The Richmond Review published its final edition on July 24, 2015, ending 83 years of continuous operation. At the time of its closure, the paper employed 14 staff members, including a newsroom of four journalists led by editor Bhreandain Clugston.

== Archives ==
Following the closure, the City of Richmond Archives was invited to preserve the paper's physical and historical assets. The acquisition resulted in the transfer of more than 50,000 photographic negatives and digital images taken by staff reporters spanning from 1982 to 2015.

Additionally, the archives combined holdings with the Richmond Public Library to centralize a complete hard-copy and microfilm run of the paper from 1932 through 2015. Local historians and researchers utilize the collection as a primary source for 20th-century Richmond community history.

== Legacy ==
In 2016, former staff members of the Richmond Review—including reporters Martin van den Hemel and Don Fennell, photographer Chung Chow, production manager Jaana Bjork, joined to help launch the Richmond Sentinel, an independent community newspaper aimed at filling the local news coverage gap left by the Review's departure.

== See also ==
- List of newspapers in Canada
- Richmond News
