= A History of the Negro Troops in the War of the Rebellion, 1861–1865 =

1888 book by George Washington Williams

A History of the Negro Troops in the War of the Rebellion, 1861–1865 by George Washington Williams (published 1888) was a major book-length academic history of military history of African Americans in the American Civil War. Carter G. Woodson called it "one of the most valuable accounts of the Civil War."

Williams himself served with the U.S. Colored Troops. Williams has been described as "the finest black prose stylist of his day" and his History showcases this skill. Williams' book has been called the most important of a trio of histories of 19th-century African-American military histories written by black authors, alongside William Wells Brown's The Negro in the American Rebellion and Joseph T. Wilson's The Black Phalanx.

Williams' historiographic use of newspaper reports, soliciting records of local groups through newspaper advertisements, and oral histories, including traveling to interview soldiers, was pioneering. The creation of the book is considered a part of the "birth of black studies."

== See also ==
- Bibliography of the American Civil War § African Americans
