= George Washington Williams =

American soldier, minister, politician, lawyer, journalist and historian (1849–1891)

The Reverend George Washington Williams
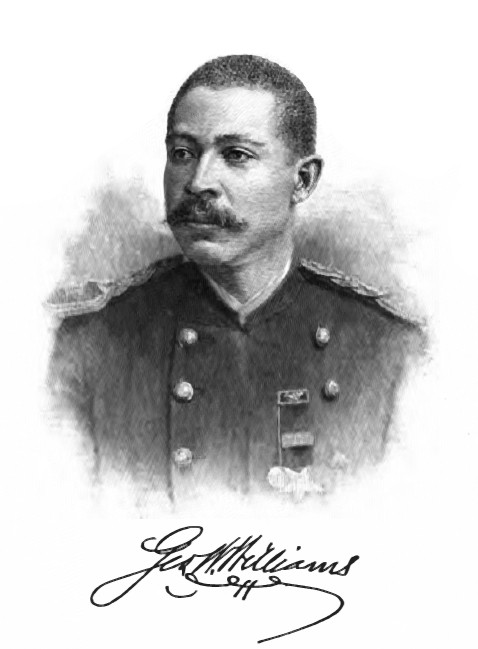

Member of the Ohio House of Representatives
- In office 1880–1881

Personal details
- Born: October 16, 1849 Bedford Springs, Pennsylvania, U.S.
- Died: August 1, 1891 (aged 41) Blackpool, England
- Party: Republican
- Children: 1
- Occupation: Soldier, minister, historian, journalist

George Washington Williams (October 16, 1849 – August 2, 1891) was an American soldier, minister, politician, lawyer, journalist and historian.

He served in the American Civil War and in Mexico before becoming a Baptist minister, politician, lawyer, journalist, and writer on African-American history. He served in the Ohio House of Representatives.

In the late 1880s, Williams turned his interest to Europe and Africa. After having been impressed by meeting King Leopold II of Belgium, he traveled in 1890 to the Congo Free State (then owned by the king) to see its development. Shocked by the widespread brutal abuses and slavery imposed on the Congolese, he wrote an open letter to Leopold in 1890 about the suffering of the region's native inhabitants at the hands of the king's agents. This letter, which subsequently popularized the term "crimes against humanity", was a catalyst for an international outcry against the regime running the Congo, which had caused millions of deaths.

== Early life ==
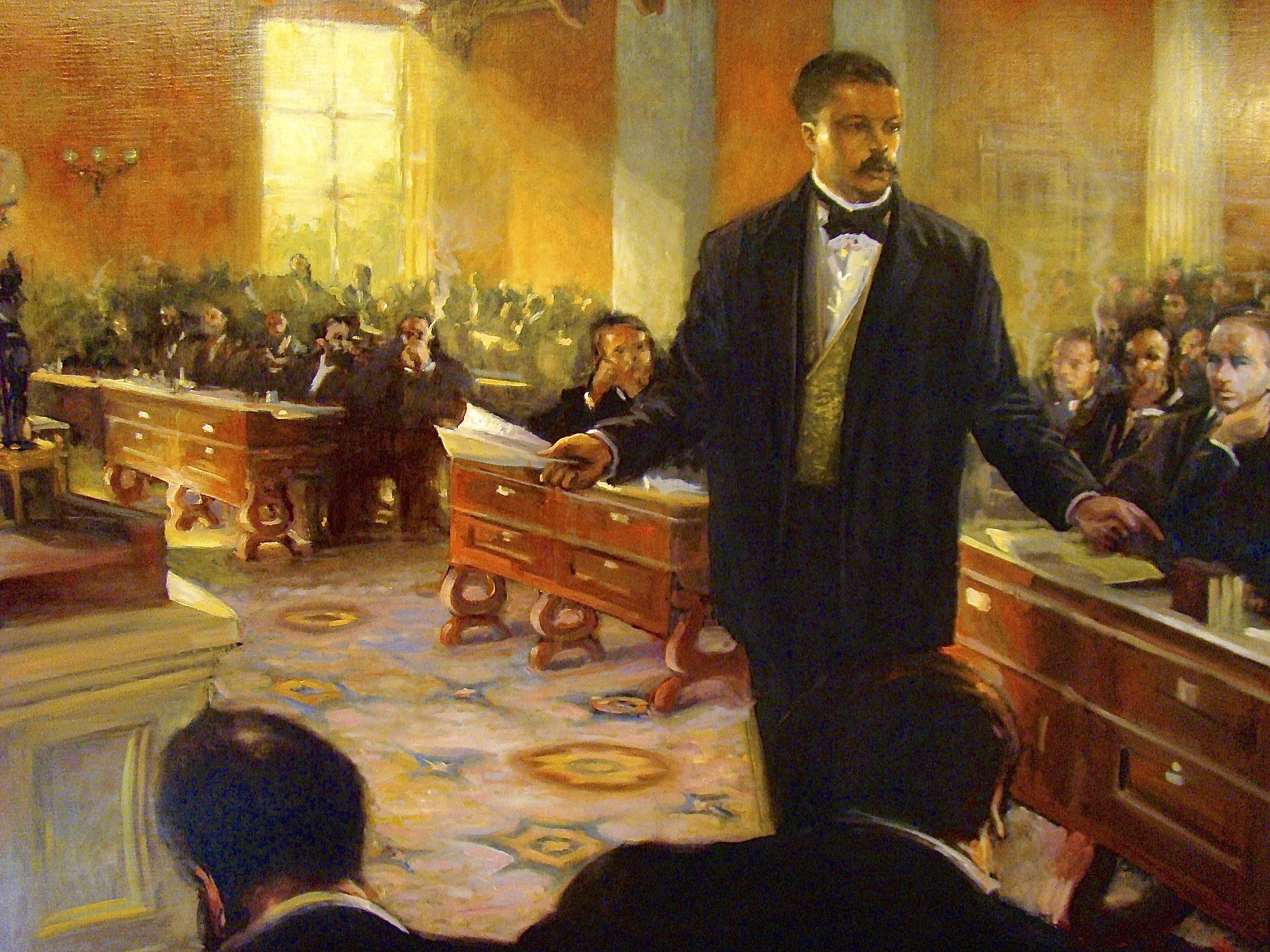
George Washington Williams addressing the Ohio Legislature

Williams was born free in 1849 in Bedford Springs, Pennsylvania, to two African Americans, Thomas, a laborer, and Ellen Rouse Williams. He was the oldest of four children; his brothers were John, Thomas and Harry Lawsom Williams. The boys had a limited education. For a time, Williams lived in a "house of refuge", where he learned barbering, considered a skilled and advantageous trade at the time. During the American Civil War, Williams ran away to enlist at the age of 14 in the Union Army under an assumed name; he fought during the final battles.

After the war, Williams went to Mexico, where he was among Americans who joined the Republican Army under the command of General Espinosa, fighting to overthrow Emperor Maximilian. He was commissioned as a lieutenant, learned some Spanish, and earned a reputation as a good gunner. He returned to the U.S. in the spring of 1867 and re-enlisted for a five-year stint in the Army. Williams was assigned to the 10th Cavalry "Buffalo Soldiers" in the Indian Territory, but was wounded in a lung in 1868 and was hospitalized until his discharge that year.

=== Education ===
After returning to civilian life, the young veteran decided to attend college. He was accepted at Howard University, a historically black college in Washington, DC, but did not stay long. In 1870, Williams began studies at the Newton Theological Institution near Boston, Massachusetts. In 1874, Williams became the first African American to graduate from Newton.

=== Marriage and family ===
He met Sarah A. Sterrett during a visit to Chicago in 1873. They were married the following spring when he graduated from Newton Theological. They had one son together.

== Religious and political career ==
After graduation, Williams was ordained as a Baptist minister. He held several pastorates, including the historic Twelfth Baptist Church of Boston. Williams served a pastorate in Washington, DC. While there, with support from many of the leaders of his time, such as Frederick Douglass and William Lloyd Garrison, Williams founded The Commoner, a weekly journal. (This had no relation to William Jennings Bryan's later publication of the same title). Williams published eight issues.

Williams moved with his family to Cincinnati, Ohio, where he continued as a preacher. In addition, he studied law under Alphonso Taft (father of President William Howard Taft), reading the law with an established firm. He passed the bar.

He became the first African American elected to the Ohio state legislature, serving one term from Cincinnati for 1880 to 1881. According to his biographer, historian John Hope Franklin, he offended his constituents by offering a bill that "threatened to deny members of a local African Methodist church the right to bury their dead in what was becoming an exclusive suburb" of the river city. Although the bill died in committee, Williams was not re-elected and his state political career abruptly ended. He turned to practicing law. Franklin noted Williams' ability to persist and pick up new endeavors after he had closed off some fields.

=== Nominated to state post ===
In the last weeks of his administration, President Chester A. Arthur nominated Williams as "Minister Resident and Consul General" to Haiti and Santo Domingo in early 1885, but he was not confirmed, as he was not considered qualified. Grover Cleveland, the president elected in 1884, nominated Democrat John E. W. Thompson to the positions soon after taking office in 1885. Thompson was confirmed by the Senate.

In 1887, Williams was given an honorary doctorate of law by Simmons College of Kentucky, a historically black college, where he spoke at a commencement ceremony.

In 1888, Thompson was a delegate to the World's Conference of Foreign Missions at London. Although he failed to gain entry as a delegate to an anti-slave trade conference in Brussels in the spring of 1890, he made other arrangements to visit the city and the continent. (See below)

=== Advocate for Colonizing South America with Freedmen ===
As of 1888, Williams favored relocating former U.S. slaves to South America.

=== Historian ===
Williams' most substantial achievement was as a historian. He wrote groundbreaking histories about African Americans in the United States: The History of the Negro Race in America 1619–1880 was published in 1882. It is considered to be the first overall history of African Americans, showing their participation and contributions from the earliest days of the colonies. Here, Williams used the term “crime against humanity” in his reflections about the immorality of slavery in the United States, which was one the earliest usages of the term in its modern sense. In addition, he wrote a history of the United States Colored Troops and African-American participation in the American Civil War, A History of Negro Troops in the War of Rebellion (1887).

=== Travel to Europe and Africa ===
In 1889, Williams arranged to go to Europe to write articles as a representative of S. S. McClure's Associated Literary Press. He was granted an informal interview with King Leopold II of Belgium, with whom he was initially very impressed. He became interested in traveling in the Congo Free State, which the King personally owned and discussed his interest in developing. Williams got additional support from President Benjamin Harrison's administration and traveled to the Congo in 1890. He was appalled at what he found, as the King employed a private militia to enforce rubber production by the Congolese. Williams found evidence to support the widespread rumors of harsh abuses against workers and their families, that had resulted in a state of near slavery for many families, physical mutilation of workers who could not meet production goals, and a high rate of deaths.

From Stanley Falls, Williams wrote "An Open Letter to His Serene Majesty Leopold II, King of the Belgians and Sovereign of the Independent State of Congo" on July 18, 1890. In this letter, he condemned the brutal and inhuman treatment of the Congolese at the hands of Europeans and Africans supervising them for the Congo Free State. He mentioned the role played by Henry M. Stanley, sent to the Congo by the King, in deceiving and mistreating local Congolese. Williams reminded the King that the crimes committed were all committed in his name, making him as guilty as the perpetrators. He appealed to the international community of the day to "call and create an International Commission to investigate the charges herein preferred in the name of Humanity ...".

The King and his supporters tried to discredit Williams, but he continued to speak out about the abuses in the Congo Free State, helping to generate actions in Belgium and the international community. Eventually the Belgian government took over supervising the Congo Free State and tried to improve treatment of the Congolese.

=== Death in England ===
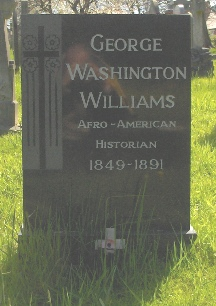
George Washington Williams' grave, Layton Cemetery, Blackpool, England

While travelling back from Africa, he became ill in Cairo and travelled back to London with his fiancée Alice Fryer as he was living separated from his wife. Williams died in Blackpool, England, on August 2, 1891, from tuberculosis and pleurisy. He is buried in Layton Cemetery, Blackpool. In 1975, a tombstone was placed at his grave by an American historian and local supporters, commemorating Williams as an "Afro-American historian".

== Legacy and honors ==
- In 1975 a tombstone was placed at Williams' grave in England, noting him as an "Afro-American historian".
- The George Washington Williams Memorial Room was named in his honor on the first floor of the Ohio State House.
- The GW Williams House at George Washington University is named in his honor.
- The Ohio legislature commissioned a video documentary of Williams: George Washington Williams: A Portrait of Faith, Courage and Wisdom (2002; run time = 26m29s). No longer available online, obtainable via interlibrary loan.
- Samuel L. Jackson played a fictionalized version of Williams in the Congo in the 2016 film The Legend of Tarzan. Jackson was in his late 60s during filming, an age which the real Williams never reached.

== Books ==
- History of the Negro Race in America From 1619 to 1800 (vol 1) and 1800–1880 (vol 2): Negroes As Slaves, As Soldiers, and As Citizens (1882) full text at Internet Archive
- A History of the Negro Troops in the War of the Rebellion, 1861–1865 (1888) full text at Internet Archive
