= William Mack Lee =

American fraudster who claimed to be Robert E. Lee's personal body servant

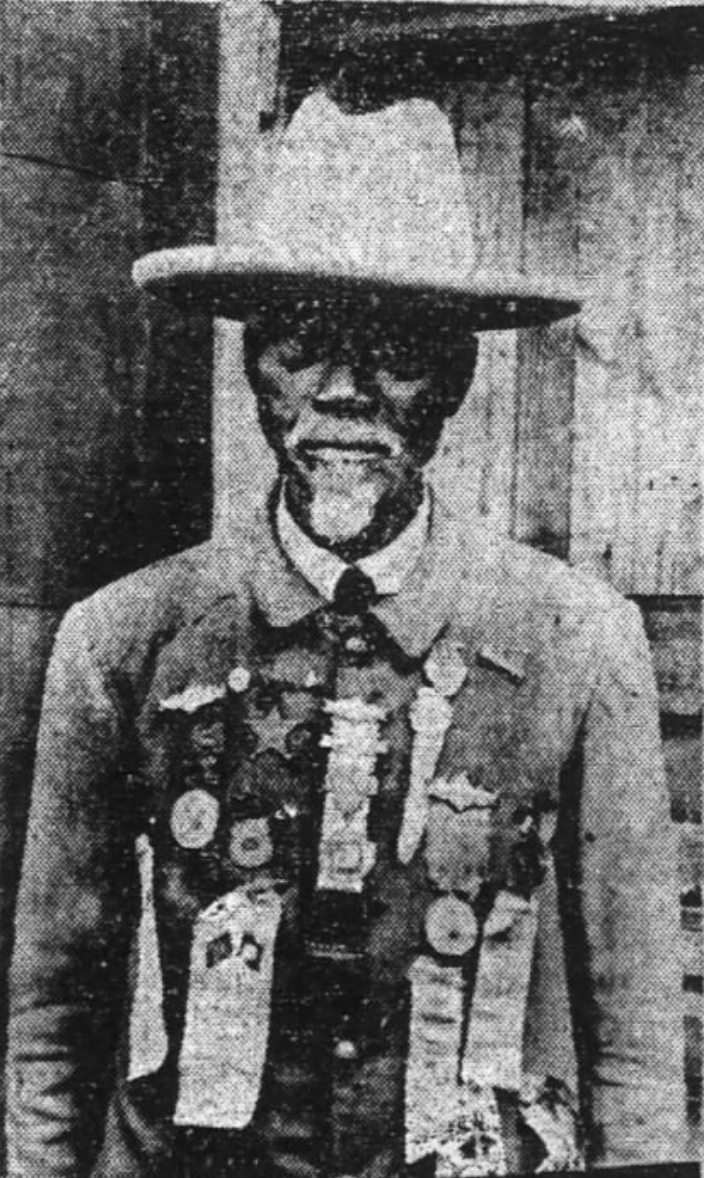
- Lee in 1919
- Born: June 12, 1835; Westmoreland County, Virginia, U.S.
- Died: November 6, 1932 (aged 97); Norfolk, Virginia, U.S.
- Occupation: minister
- Known for: Fraud claiming to be a body servant of Robert E. Lee

William Mack Lee (June 12, 1835 – November 6, 1932) was an American fraudster who claimed to have served as a cook and body servant to Confederate General Robert E. Lee during the American Civil War. He was referred to by The Roanoke News as "one of the best known colored men in the South" in 1921. His claims were refuted in a 1927 edition of Confederate Veteran.

== Biography ==
Lee was born on June 12, 1835, in Westmoreland County, Virginia. He claimed to have grown up as an enslaved person at Arlington House, a large plantation owned by the Lee family, despite his name not appearing on the list of enslaved persons at Arlington.

He claimed to have served in the Confederate States Army during the American Civil War as a cook and body servant to General Robert E. Lee, stating that he was with General Lee at the First Battle of Bull Run, the Second Battle of Bull Run, the First Battle of Manassas, the Second Battle of Manassas, and present at the surrender of Confederate forces at Appomattox. He often attended reunions of the United Confederate Veterans and was a guest speaker at various events hosted by the Sons of Confederate Veterans and the United Daughters of the Confederacy.

In 1918, Lee published a pamphlet called History of the Life of Rev. Wm. Mack Lee, Body Servant of General Robert E. Lee Through The Civil War.. Cook from 1861 to 1865.. Still Living Under the Protection of the Southern States.

His false claims fooled many prominent southerners at the time and his story was posted as truth in American newspapers. He was referred to by The Roanoke News as "one of the best known colored men in the South" in 1921.

In 1927, Edith D. Pope, the editor of Confederate Veteran, debunked Lee's claims of having served as Lee's personal servant in the magazine's September issue.

Lee died on November 6, 1932, in Norfolk, Virginia.

== See also ==
- Weary Clyburn
- Marlboro Jones
- Jefferson Shields
