= Klondike =

Klondike may refer to:

== Places ==
=== Canada ===
- Klondike, Yukon, a region in the Yukon
  - Klondike (electoral district), a district of the Legislative Assembly of Yukon
- Klondike Highway, connecting Skagway, Alaska to Dawson City, Yukon
- Klondike River, the landmark after which is named:
  - Klondike Gold Rush, a historical migration to this part of the Yukon
  - Klondike Gold Rush National Historical Park
  - North Klondike River, a tributary of the Klondike River

=== United States ===
- Klondike, DeKalb County, Georgia
- Klondike, Hall County, Georgia
- Klondike, Illinois
- Klondike, Indiana
- Klondike, Maryland
- Klondike, Louisville, Kentucky
- Klondike, Missouri
- Klondike, Oregon
- Klondike, Pennsylvania
- Klondike, Dawson County, Texas
- Klondike, Delta County, Texas
- Klondike, West Virginia
- Klondike, Kenosha County, Wisconsin
- Klondike, Oconto County, Wisconsin
- Klondike Glacier, in Shoshone National Forest, Wyoming
- Klondike Park (St. Charles County), in St. Charles County, Missouri

== Arts, entertainment and media ==
=== Games ===
- Klondike (board game)
- Klondike (solitaire), a popular solitaire card game

=== Television ===
- Klondike (miniseries), a 2014 Discovery Channel miniseries
- Klondike (TV series), a 1960-1961 television series on NBC
- An Klondike, a 2015 four-part TV series in both Irish and English

=== Other uses in arts, entertainment, and media ===
- Klondike (1932 film), an American film directed by Phil Rosen
- Klondike (2022 film), a Ukrainian film
- Klondike Kat, a cartoon
- 555 (North American Numbering Plan) (Klondike 5), the fictional telephone number prefix

== Brands and enterprises ==
- Klondike bar, a frozen confection consisting of an ice cream square coated in chocolate
- Klondike Hotel and Casino, a hotel and casino in Las Vegas
- Klondike Pete, a cartoon character created to promote the breakfast cereal Golden Nuggets

== Sports ==
- Klondike, the name for Ohio Northern University's mascot
- Klondike derby, a winter competition event for Boy Scouts
- Klondike Open, a darts tournament in Edmonton, Alberta, Canada

== Other uses ==
- Klondike (boxer), an African American boxer
- SS Klondike and SS Klondike II, two sternwheelers that carried freight on the Yukon River

== See also ==
- Clondalkin, Ireland
- Klendike, Kansas
- Klondyke (disambiguation)
- Alaska Gold Rush (disambiguation)
