= Klondike High School (Texas) =

Location
- 2911 County Road H Lamesa, Texas 79331; United States; 32.566133°N 101.958734°W

Information
- School type: Public high school
- School district: Klondike Independent School District
- Principal: Danielle Therwhanger
- Teaching staff: 22.82 (on an FTE basis)
- Grades: PK-12
- Enrollment: 253 (2023-2024)
- Student to teacher ratio: 11.09
- Colors: Maroon, black, and white
- Athletics conference: UIL Class A
- Mascot: Cougar
- Website: Klondike High School

Klondike High School or Klondike School is a public high school located just south of unincorporated Klondike, Texas (USA) and classified as a 1A school by the UIL. It is part of the Klondike Independent School District that covers the southwest portion of Dawson County along with much of northern Martin County. In 2013, the school was rated "Met Standard" by the Texas Education Agency. In 2015, Klondike was named a Blue Ribbon School by the United States Department of Education.

== Athletics ==
The Klondike Cougars compete in the following sports:

- Basketball
- Cross Country
- 6-Man Football
- Track and Field
- Volleyball

=== State Titles ===
- Girls Basketball
  - 1969(B)

== See also ==
List of Six-man football stadiums in Texas
