= Klondike, Texas =

Klondike, Texas may refer to:

- Klondike, Dawson County, Texas
- Klondike, Delta County, Texas
- Trotti, Texas, formerly Klondike

== See also ==
- Klondike (disambiguation)
