= Key, Texas =

- Unincorporated community
- Location within Texas Location within the United States
- Coordinates: 32°43′41″N 101°47′58″W
- Country: United States
- State: Texas
- County: Dawson
- Elevation: 2,933 ft (894 m)
- Time zone: UTC-6 (Central (CST))
  - Summer (DST): UTC-5 (CDT)
- Area code: 806
- GNIS feature ID: 1339063

Key is an unincorporated community in Dawson County, Texas, United States. According to the Handbook of Texas, the community had an estimated population of 20 in 2000.

== Geography ==
Key is located at the intersection of U.S. Highway 180 and Farm to Market Road 178, 12 mi (19 km) east of Lamesa, 45 mi (72 km) northwest of Big Spring, and 52 mi (84 km) west of Snyder in east-central Dawson County.

== Education ==
Key had its own school in 1947. Today, Key is served by the Lamesa Independent School District.
