= Midway, Dawson County, Texas =

- Unincorporated community
- Location within Texas Location within the United States
- Coordinates: 32°41′10″N 101°47′11″W
- Country: United States
- State: Texas
- County: Dawson
- Elevation: 2,900 ft (880 m)
- Time zone: UTC-6 (Central (CST))
  - Summer (DST): UTC-5 (CDT)
- Area code: 806
- GNIS feature ID: 1378675

Midway is an unincorporated community in Dawson County, Texas, United States. According to the Handbook of Texas, the community had an estimated population of 20 in 2000.

== Geography ==
Midway is located on Farm to Market Road 178, 12 mi (19 km) southeast of Lamesa in southeastern Dawson County.

== Education ==
The community's location between the Mount Olive and Mullins schools gave Midway its name. Today, Midway is served by the Lamesa Independent School District.
