= Arvana, Texas =

- Unincorporated community
- Location within Texas Location within the United States
- Coordinates: 32°48′35″N 101°54′53″W
- Country: United States
- State: Texas
- County: Dawson
- Elevation: 3,025 ft (922 m)
- Time zone: UTC-6 (Central (CST))
  - Summer (DST): UTC-5 (CDT)
- Area code: 806
- GNIS feature ID: 1377956

Arvana is an unincorporated community in Dawson County, Texas, United States. According to the Handbook of Texas, the community had an estimated population of 25 in 2000.

== History ==
Arvana was founded in 1949 on the Pecos and Northern Texas Railway.

On May 18, 2021, an EF0 tornado struck Arvana. A funnel cloud with rotating dust beneath lasted 3–5 minutes. No damage was reported.

== Geography ==
Arvana is located at the junction of U.S. Highway 87 and Farm to Market Road 2411 on the Atchison, Topeka and Santa Fe Railway, 5 mi (8.0 km) northeast of Lamesa in north-central Dawson County.

== Education ==
Arvana is served by the Lamesa Independent School District.
