= Lamesa Farm Workers Community Historic District =

Historic district in Texas, United States

- U.S. National Register of Historic Places
- U.S. Historic district
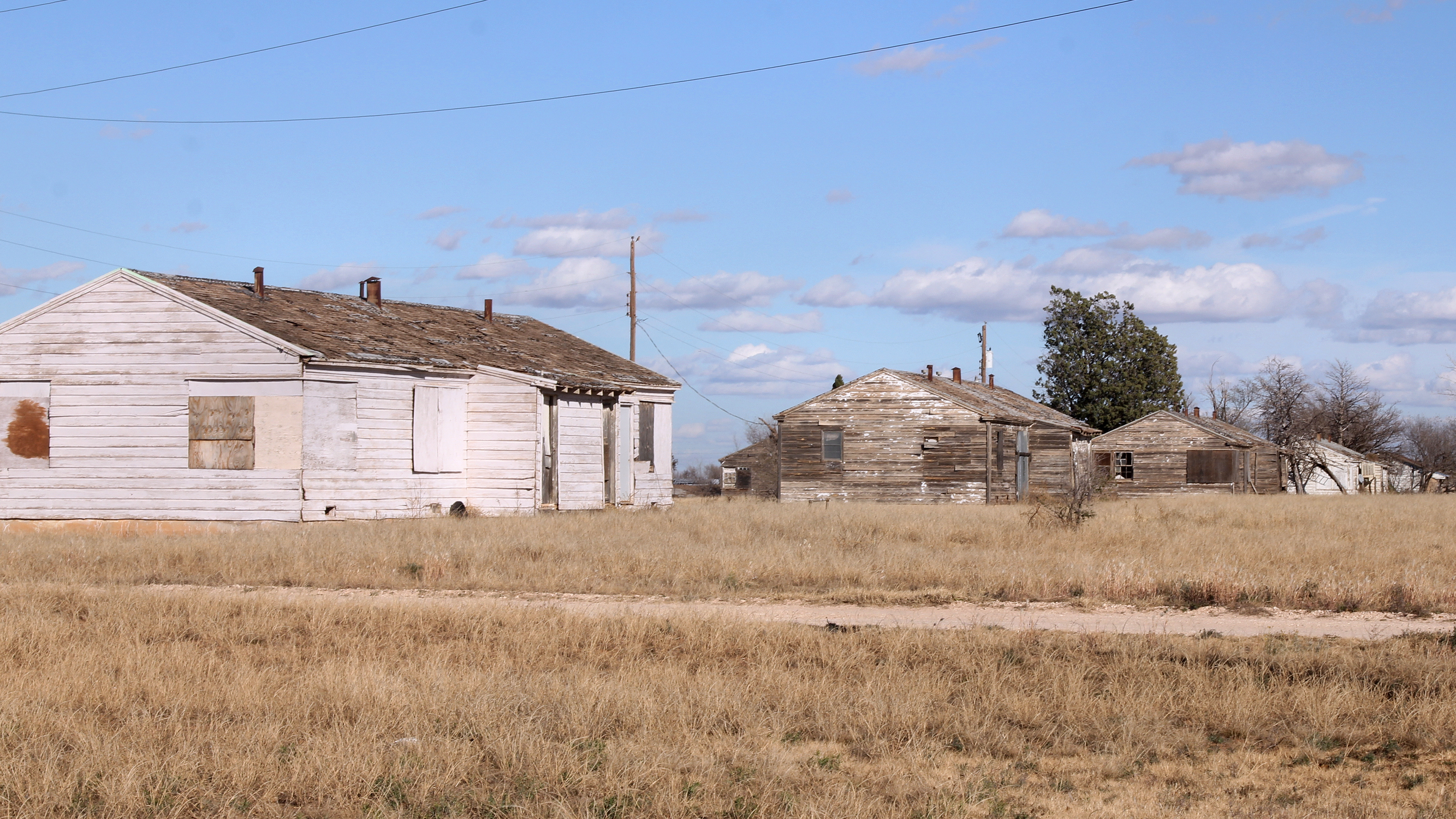
- Lamesa Farm Workers Community in 2018

- Location within Texas Location within the United States
- Location: Jct. of US 87 and US 180, Los Ybanez, Texas
- Coordinates: 32.7190°N 101.9178°W
- Area: 50 acres (20 ha)
- Built: 1941-1942
- Built by: Fox Rig & Lumber Co.
- Architect: Hudson J. Elmo
- NRHP reference No.: 93000771
- Added to NRHP: August 9, 1993

The Lamesa Farm Workers Community Historic District in Los Ybanez in Dawson County, Texas, was listed on the National Register of Historic Places in 1993. It is a 50 acres (20 ha) historic district which included 32 contributing buildings.

It includes a number of farm worker houses, a number of 60 by 22 feet (18.3 m × 6.7 m) quadruplex shelters, a community center, a manager's house, a liquor store, a water tank, and other structures.

It is located about 1 mile north of the junction of US 87 and US 180 in Los Ybanez.

== See also ==
- National Register of Historic Places listings in Dawson County, Texas
