= Connecticut Rivers Council =

Local council of Scouting America

Connecticut Rivers Council (#066)
- Owner: Scouting America
- Headquarters: Hartford, Connecticut
- Location: Connecticut & Fishers Island, New York
- Country: United States
- Founded: 1995
- Council President: Bill Shea
- Council Commissioner: Norman Noel
- Scout Executive: Mark Switzer
- Website ctscouting.org

The headquarters of the Connecticut Rivers Council of Scouting America is located in Hartford, Connecticut. The present council was formed as the result of the merger between the Indian Trails Council of Norwich, Connecticut and Long Rivers Council of Hartford, Connecticut. Now it is the largest council in the state with a youth membership of over 17,000 and a volunteer base of nearly 5,000 adults, serving over half of the state.

The council's camps include the June Norcross Webster Scout Reservation in Ashford, Mattatuck Scout Reservation in Plymouth, Edmund D. Strang Scout Reservation in Goshen, F.S. Barbour Scout Reservation in Norfolk, and Camp Workcoeman in New Hartford. See below for more information on the individual camps.

The council's Order of the Arrow Lodge is Tschitani Lodge No. 10.

== Organization ==
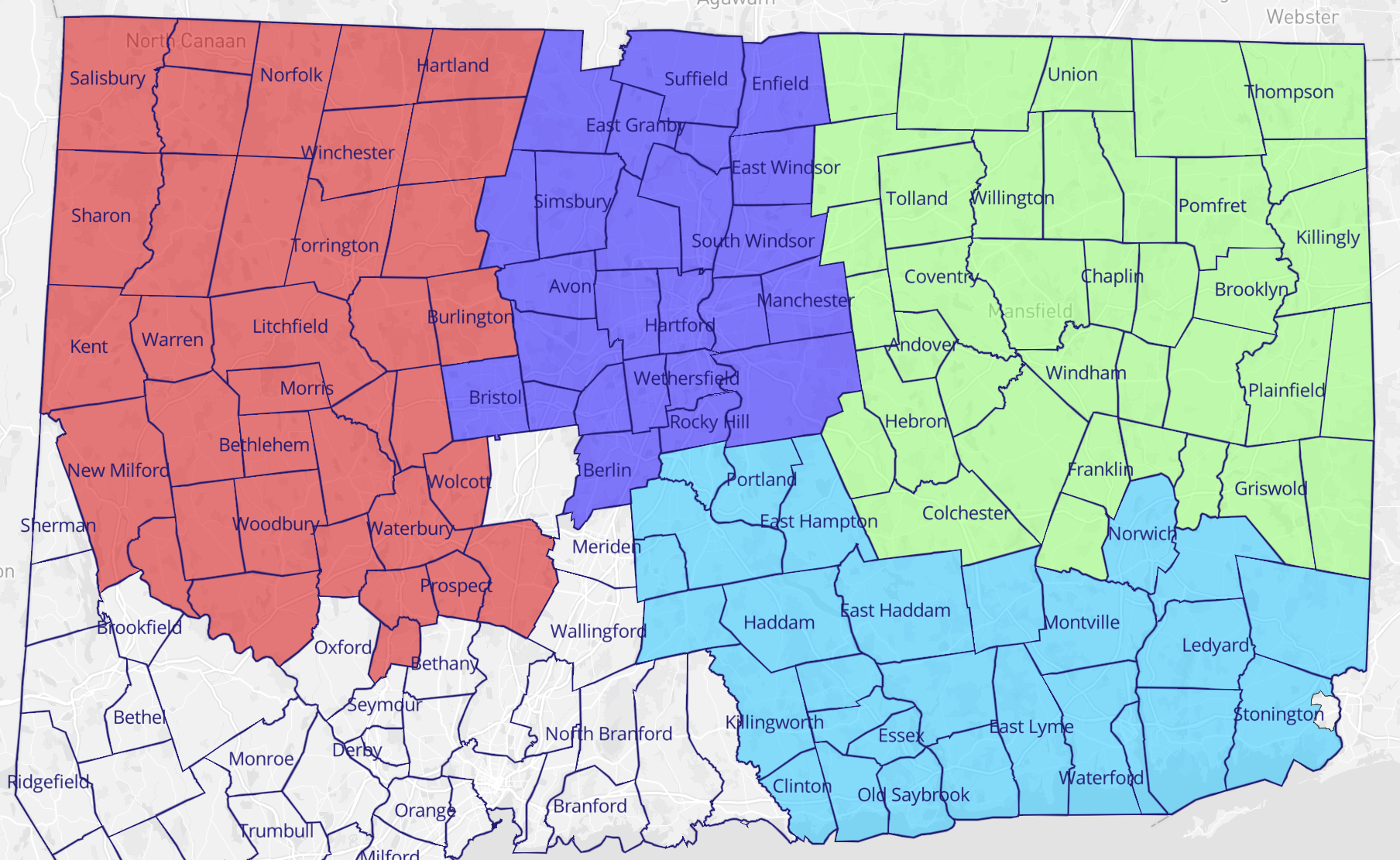
Map of the Connecticut Rivers Council, Scouting America (excluding Fisher's Island, NY). Red is the Western District, purple is the Charter Oak District, green is the Leaders of the Revolution District, and blue is the Southeastern District.

Connecticut Rivers Council is divided into the following districts:

- Leaders of the Revolution District serves the following communities: Somers, Stafford, Union, Woodstock, Thompson, Ellington, Tolland, Willington, Ashford, Eastford, Pomfret, Putnam, Vernon, Coventry, Mansfield, Chaplin, Hampton, Brooklyn, Killingly, Bolton, Andover, Columbia, Windham, Scotland, Canterbury, Plainfield, Sterling, Hebron, Marlborough, Colchester, Columbia, Lebanon, Franklin, Bozrah, Sprague, Lisbon, Griswold, and Voluntown
- Charter Oak District serves the following communities: Bloomfield, Canton, East Granby, East Windsor, Enfield, Granby, Simsbury, South Windsor, Suffield, Windsor, Windsor Locks, Avon, Berlin, Bristol, East Hartford, Farmington, Glastonbury, Hartford, Manchester, New Britain, Newington, Plainville, Rocky Hill, West Hartford, and Wethersfield
- Western District serves the following communities: Barkhamsted, Beacon Falls, Bethlehem, Bridgewater, Burlington, Canaan, Cheshire, Colebrook, Cornwall, Goshen, Hartland, Harwinton, Kent, Litchfield, Middlebury, Morris, Naugatuck, New Hartford, New Milford, Norfolk, North Canaan, Plymouth, Prospect, Roxbury, Salisbury, Sharon, Southbury, Thomaston, Torrington, Washington, Warren, Waterbury, Watertown, West Cornwall, Wolcott, Woodbury, Winchester, and Winsted
- Southeastern District serves the following communities: Chester, Clinton, Cromwell, Deep River, Durham, East Haddam, East Hampton, East Lyme, Essex, Groton, Haddam, Killingworth, Ledyard, Middlefield, Middletown, Montville, North Stonington, New London, Norwich, Old Lyme, Old Saybrook, Portland, Preston, Salem, Stonington, Waterford, Westbrook, and Fisher's Island, (NY).
- Housatonic District serves the following communities: Ansonia, Derby, Oxford, Seymour, and Shelton.
- Scoutreach Division

== Camps ==
=== June Norcross Webster Scout Reservation ===
June Norcross Webster Scout Reservation
- Location: Ashford, Connecticut
- Founded: 1964
- Director: Pat Boyd
- Council: Connecticut Rivers Council
- Website www.gotowebster.org

JN Webster Scout Reservation is located in the scenic New England Town of Ashford, Connecticut. Originally opened as Camp Ashford on June 28, 1964, today the reservation occupies 1,200 acres (4.9 km^{2}) of land and a 30-acre (120,000 m^{2}) man-made lake named Goss Pond. The camp is located on the farm once owned by Lt. Col. Thomas Knowlton, hero of the Battle of Bunker Hill and a commander in the Continental Army. The reservation has two camps; The Stanley Black & Decker Base Camp and the Cub Country. In 1963, Eastern Connecticut Council sold Camp Quinebaug to purchase 1,200 acres (4.9 km^{2}) property with a 25-acre (100,000 m^{2}) lake in Ashford, Connecticut. The camp was named Camp Ashford and was officially opened on June 28, 1964. After two years of operations, the name was changed to June Norcross Webster Scout Reservation after a donation on behalf of June Norcross-Webster, of the Norcross Greeting Card Company. A large land donation was also made by the Brand Trust. The Base Camp (Ashford 1) is the home to the Boy Scout Resident camp while the Cub Country (Ashford 2) is home to Cub Scout Resident Camp, Akela Day Camp, and National Youth Leadership Training. The reservation has been operated by three different councils: Eastern Connecticut Council of Norwich, Connecticut 1964–1971, Indian Trails Council of Norwich, Connecticut 1971-1995, and Connecticut Rivers Council of East Hartford, Connecticut since 1995. It is the largest Scout Camp in the State of Connecticut.

=== Mattatuck Scout Reservation ===
Mattatuck Scout Reservation
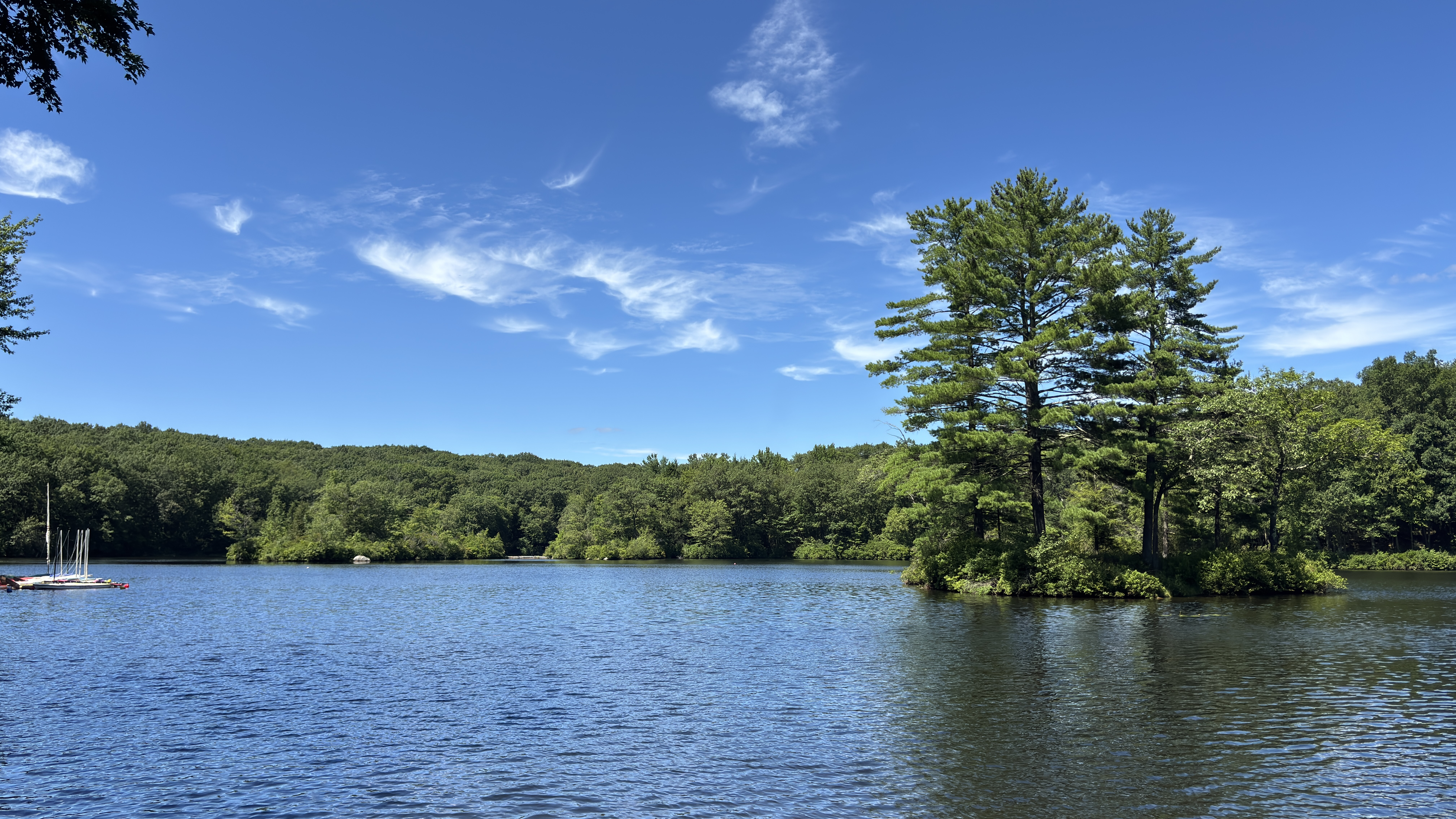
- Location: Plymouth, Connecticut
- Founded: 1939
- Director: Jeromy Nelson
- Council: Connecticut Rivers Council
- Website www.campmattatuck.org

Established in 1939, Mattatuck Scout Reservation sits on 500 acres of land in Plymouth, CT, just north of Waterbury. Included in the property are Tomlinson Pond (referred to by the camp as Lake Kenosha) and part of Brophy Pond. Each summer, Mattatuck runs a Scouts BSA Resident Camp, Cub Scout Resident Camp, and Cub Scout Day Camp. Mattatuck also hosts a variety of seasonal events such as fishing derbies, Klondike derbies, various camporees and a Halloween "Spooktacular". Since 2021, it has hosted Laurel Music Camp.

=== Frederick Sprague Barbour Scout Reservation ===
The 106-acre (0.43 km^{2}) camp is located in Norfolk, Connecticut. It is suitable for wilderness camping. The camp was devastated after an ice storm. However, in November 2010, a camp-wide project was held to restore the camp. Around 70 Scouts from the Connecticut Rivers Council helped to refurbish the camp, which is now usable again.

=== Edmund D. Strang Scout Reservation ===
The roughly 186-acre (0.75 km^{2}) scout camp is located in Goshen, Connecticut. Founded in 1961 under the name Housatonic Scout Reservation, the land was later renamed in 1990 to honor its co-founder: World War II veteran and life-long Scouter Ed Strang. Camp Strang was operated by Housatonic Council until its 2026 merger with Connecticut Rivers Council.

=== Camp Workcoeman ===
Camp Workcoeman is located on the shore of West Hill Lake in New Hartford, Connecticut. Established in 1924, it is one of the oldest, continuously operated Scout camps in the country. For over 100 years, thousands of Scouts and Scouters have experienced Scouting at its best at Camp Workcoeman. Until 2021, it was also home to Laurel Music Camp. In 1994, Camp Workcoeman was part of a study conducted by the National Boy Scout Council for exemplary Scout camps in the country.

The program includes Swimming and Boating on the West Hill Pond (sail boats, snorkeling, stand-up paddle boards, underwater nature hike, team canoeing, camp-wide aquatic meet, kayaking and Polar Bear Swim). Older Scouts can use the Shawtown Wilderness Trek. For younger Scouts, the Tenderfoot's Compass Program is offered. This program, based around the patrol method, focuses on teaching basic Scouting skills and includes Swimming Merit Badge. Each week a number of camp-wide activities are scheduled, including Aquatic Meet, Scoutmaster Shoot-Off, Friday Night Campfire, Saturday Court of Honor and Family Bar-B-Que.

Camp Workcoeman stopped offering Scouts BSA resident camp at the start of the COVID-19 pandemic in 2020. Since then, the camp offered weekend programs year around and also hosted one of two National Youth Leadership Training courses for the council during the summer. In 2026, Camp Workcoeman also began offering a resident Summer Camp program for Cub Scouts.

=== Mark Greer Scout Reservation (Sold) ===
This 340-acre (1.4 km^{2}) camp was located in Bozrah, Connecticut and was established in 1947 by the Middlesex County Council of Scouting America. It was the chief summer camp for Boy Scouts from this small council from 1947 until a merger of five councils in 1972. The Long Rivers Council, which resulted from this merger, used this camp as a Boy Scout summer camp up until 1976, when a declining Boy Scout-aged population forced the council to end the summer camp program. By the mid-1960s, the Camp Tadma property also became known as Mark Greer Scout Reservation in honor of a local Scouting patron.

There were five campsites available: Pioneer, Mohegan, Kiehtan, Tantaquidgeon and Uncas. The dining hall was also a small operation and could not have fit much more than 120 Scouts. During its last year of camp operations in 1976, the Tadma kitchen was run by Joe Grillo, who would go on to become the famous PGA caddy Joe "Gypsy" Grillo.

The council attempted to make the camp a high adventure base in 1977 and 1978, but demand was not there. It ran a pilot Cub Scout day camp during the summer of 1977. In the 1990s, Tadma's Venture Post number 78 was chosen to represent the year, 1978, that the council decided to make Camp Tadma strictly a Cub Scout resident camp during the summer camp season. In 1979, Long Rivers Council reopened summer camping at Camp Tadma for Webelos. Its program was one of five camps in the nation that was used to create the Cub Scout Camping Program in 1984. With the Long Rivers-Indian Trails Council merger in the 1990s, Camp Tadma retained this summer camp program but closed as a resident camp in 2013. The property was Sold to a local Church in February 2015.

== Order of the Arrow ==
Tschitani Lodge
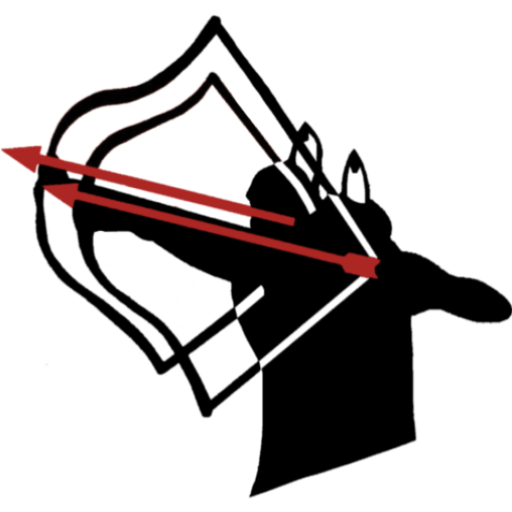

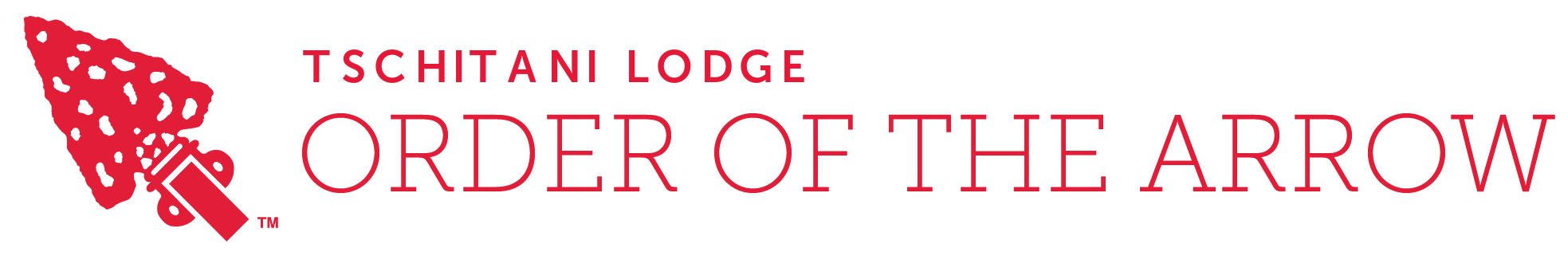
- Founded: 1995
- Lodge Chief: Jack Fitzgerald
- Lodge Adviser: Kevin Rame
- Staff Adviser: Michele Soboslai
- Website www.tschitani.org

Tschitani Lodge No. 10 is the Order of the Arrow lodge for the Connecticut Rivers Council. The name translates to "stronger one" in Lenape. Their totem is of two Native Americans shooting arrows, nicknamed the "twin archers" by members. Each archer represents one of the two Lodges, Sassacus and Eluwak, that merged to form Tschitani in 1995.

Before the merge, a joint meeting between Sassacus and Eluwak was held at Camp Tadma in the spring of 1995. In fall, a joint lodge conclave was held, hosted by Sassacus Lodge, at June Norcross Webster Scout Reservation in Ashford. On September 17, 1995, the membership voted on their bylaws, chose the name Tschitani for the new lodge, and a slate of officers were elected. An Official Charter was given to the Tschitani Lodge on January 1, 1996.

In the years 1996, 2001, 2009, and 2025 Tschitani Lodge hosted Section Conclaves for NE-1B, NE-2A, and now Section E20 at June Norcross Webster Scout Reservation. Since its founding, the Lodge has changed their bylaws to elect 3 Lodge Vice Chiefs of Program, Communications, and Administration at their annual Fall Fellowship. 3 Camp Chiefs, of JN Webster, Mattatuck, and Workcoeman, are elected as Lodge Officers in addition to the Chief and Vice Chiefs. The Lodge also now services 4 Chapters that align with Council Districts: Corsair (Western), Mantis (Charter Oak), Nathan Hale (Leaders of the Revolution), and Nautilus (Southeastern).

At the 2005 National Order of the Arrow Conference, Tschitani Lodge received the 2004 and 2006 NOAC Spirit Award and the ceremonial team received Honor Medals. The lodge received the National Quality Lodge award in 1997 and 2002. As the first lodge in the state, it was recipient of the National OA Service Grant in 2005.

In its over 30 year history, Tschitani Lodge has been home to 3 National Officers including Northeast Region Chiefs Pat Boyd (2001) and Jon Hagenow (2017), as well as the first Eastern Region Chief for the Order of the Arrow: Alex Pillis (2022). The Lodge has also had 5 Distinguished Service Award (DSA) recipients.

== See also ==
- Scouting in Connecticut
