= Sand, Dawson County, Texas =

Ghost town in Texas, US

Sand, Texas
- Ghost town
- Location in Texas
- Coordinates: 32.7042648°N 102.1723893°W
- Country: United States
- State: Texas
- County: Dawson
- Elevation: 3,028 ft (923 m)

Sand is a ghost town in Dawson County, Texas, United States.

== History ==
Sand is situated on U.S. Route 180, and is named for the surrounding sand dunes. A post office opened in 1935, with Ebbie Lee as postmaster, and closed on July 30, 1955, and became a substation of Lamesa. In 1990, the population was 20.
