= Dawson High School =

Dawson High School may refer to:

- Dawson Junior / Senior High School (Dawson, Texas), a High School in Texas
- Glenda Dawson High School in Pearland, Texas
- Dawson County High School in Glendive, Montana
- Dawson High School (Welch, Texas)
