= KJJT =

Radio station in Los Ybanez, Texas

- Los Ybanez, Texas; United States
- Broadcast area: Los Ybanez-Lamesa & following counties Midland, Howard, Midland, Gaines, Terry, Lynn, Garza, Dawson, and Borden Counties
- Frequency: 98.5 MHz

Programming
- Format: Defunct
- Affiliations: Paramount Ag News Network

Ownership
- Owner: Jesus Pena Acosta

History
- First air date: 1990
- Last air date: August 1, 2021
- Former call signs: KYMI (1990–2006); DKYMI (2006–2007); KYMI (2007); KBXJ (2007–2014)

Technical information
- Facility ID: 29267
- Class: C2
- ERP: 50,000 watts
- HAAT: 140 meters (460 ft)
- Transmitter coordinates: 32°43′22″N 102°1′50″W

Links
- Website: 985reddirtranch.com

KJJT (98.5 MHz) was an FM radio station licensed to Los Ybanez, Texas.

== History ==
KJJT was originally known as KYMI. While this was randomly assigned by the FCC (other new stations in this group were named KYMF, KYMG, KYMH, KYMJ, KYMK, etc.) and most of these changed names before actually going into operation, KYMI stayed with the name, using the retronym of "K Ybanez Mary and Israel". The founders (of the town as well as the station) were Israel and Mary Ybanez.

The station was initially on 107.9 mHz. It was moved to 98.5 as a result of changes at KADM (now KQLM) Odessa, which moved from a class C2 permit on 107.7 to a class C1 (more power, more antenna height) on 107.9. This obligated that station to move the station in Los Ybanez to a new, comparable channel, compensate them for changes in equipment, and pay to promote the changes .

The station had been programmed pursuant to a brokered time agreement where a group in Brownfield, Texas, was running a religious outreach. That group continues to this day. The group stopped feeding the station in March 2007, and the station went silent.

In November 2007, KYMI was sold to KYMI FM LLC, and its license sub KYMI License Sub LLC. The previous owner had not filed for license renewal in 2005. The next owner had to work with the previous owner to reinstate the authorization. The transmitter site (located west of Lamesa, Texas, on the Seminole Highway) was rebuilt with new air conditioning, new electrical wiring, and a rebuilt transmitter. The call letters were changed to KBXJ. The station returned to the air with a format of all Christmas music. The station called itself "Christmas 98.5" and began 24-hour-a-day operation. After Christmas, the station aired a grab-bag format of all kinds of music. In February 2008, the station began airing a format called "The West Texas Jukebox". The format is country music with album cuts by rock artists. The station also aired a few overflow sports broadcasts from KPET with which it shares facilities at 1 Radio Road. Other local programming included "Football Picks" in the fall when local politicians, students, and business owners are interviewed as to their best guess for local, area, and national contests. "Ask The Vets" Q & A with veterinarians from Brock Veterinary Clinic. A Christian music program aired in Spanish each Sunday afternoon.

In a pair of concurrent transactions, KYMI-FM LLC sold KBXJ-FM to former owner Israel Ybanez, who in turn sold it to Jesus Pena Acosta, effective March 17, 2014. On May 26, 2014, the station changed its call sign to the current KJJT. The format of general interest music in Spanish was redubbed "La Original" (The Original) because the music is a throwback to another, older KJJT station, a small daytime AM in Odessa, Texas. On June 30, an application was made to the FCC for silent authority because of a serious breakdown due to a lightning strike. This was extended into May 2, 2017. On March 17, KJJT began broadcasting a Texas Red Dirt Country format under the handle the "Red Dirt Ranch". This format was received well in this West Texas region. The Red Dirt Ranch is the only station offering this country format.

On February 6, 2020, KJJT dropped its country format and began stunting with a loop of Ritchie Valen's "La Bamba", indicating a new format was forthcoming. The next day, KJJT changed its format to Tejano music now known as KJJT, "98.5 The Wave". The station was operated by Multimedia Southwest Communications of Lubbock and J.P. Acosta from Odessa. According to Multimedia Southwest founder JL Rodriguez, the change came about because of a recently created void in the market as a result of changes in two stations from Lubbock. The station went silent May 3, 2020. Its license was not renewed and expired on August 1, 2021.
