= Mungerville, Texas =

- Unincorporated community
- Location within Texas Location within the United States
- Coordinates: 32°46′24″N 102°5′29″W
- Country: United States
- State: Texas
- County: Dawson
- Elevation: 3,025 ft (922 m)
- Time zone: UTC-6 (Central (CST))
  - Summer (DST): UTC-5 (CDT)
- Area code: 806
- GNIS feature ID: 1378719

Mungerville is an unincorporated community in Dawson County, Texas, United States. According to the Handbook of Texas, the community had an estimated population of 25 in 2000.

== History ==
Mungerville's population was 70 in 1947 and 25 in 2000.

== Education ==
Mungerville had its own school in 1947. Today, Mungerville is served by the Klondike Independent School District.
