= Klondyke =

Klondyke may refer to:

== Places ==
- Klondyke, Ontario, Canada
- The Klondyke, a causeway connecting Coley's Point and Bay Roberts, Newfoundland and Labrador, Canada
- the former name for Hazelridge, Manitoba, Canada
- an area south of Vang, Bornholm, Denmark
- Klondyke Pit, the colloquial name for the former Newcraighall Colliery in Edinburgh, Scotland
- Klondyke mill and mine, near Trefriw in north Wales

=== United States ===
- Klondyke, Arizona
  - Klondyke School District
- Klondyke, Indiana
- Klondyke, Parke County, Indiana
- Klondyke, Louisiana, the north end of Louisiana Highway 55
- Klondyke, Minnesota
- a neighbourhood of Asheville, North Carolina
- the former spelling for Klondike, Dawson County, Texas

== People ==
- Klondyke Kate (born c. 1962), English professional wrestler
- Klondyke Raaff (1879–1949), South African international rugby union player
- a ring name for Sirelda, a Canadian professional wrestler

== Other uses ==
- a nickname used for GNR Class C1 (small boiler), a class of steam locomotives
- the Klondyke wing of the Royal York Hotel in York, England
- King Klondyke, an 1899 silent film; see Stanley Lupino
- "Operation Klondyke", an episode of the television series Undercover Customs

== See also ==
- Melcher Covered Bridge, also known as the Klondyke Covered Bridge
- Klondike (disambiguation)
