= Hindman (disambiguation) =

Hindman is a surname. It may also refer to:

- Hindman, Kentucky, United States, a home-rule town
  - Hindman Settlement School, a settlement school in Hindman, Kentucky
- Hindman, Texas, United States, an unincorporated community
- Leslie Hindman Auctioneers, Chicago, USA

== See also ==
- Fort Hindman, a Confederate Civil War fort
