= Bo Robinson =

American football player (born 1956)

No. 36, 33, 41
- Positions: Running back, tight end

Personal information
- Born: May 27, 1956 (age 70); Lamesa, Texas, U.S.
- Listed height: 6 ft 2 in (1.88 m)
- Listed weight: 228 lb (103 kg)

Career information
- High school: Lamesa (Texas)
- College: West Texas State (1975–1978)
- NFL draft: 1979: 3rd round, 67th overall pick

Career history
- Detroit Lions (1979–1980); Atlanta Falcons (1981–1983); New England Patriots (1984)

Awards and highlights
- Third-team All-American (1977)

Career NFL statistics
- Rushing yards: 445
- Rushing average: 3.7
- Receptions: 37
- Receiving yards: 305
- Touchdowns: 5
- Stats at Pro Football Reference

Melvin Dell "Bo" Robinson Jr. (born May 27, 1956) is an American former professional football player who was a running back for six seasons in the National Football League (NFL) with the Detroit Lions, Atlanta Falcons and New England Patriots. He was selected by the Lions in the third round of the 1979 NFL draft after playing college football at West Texas State University.

== Early life and college ==
Melvin Dell Robinson Jr. was born on May 27, 1956, in Lamesa, Texas. He attended Lamesa High School in Lamesa.

He lettered for the West Texas State Buffaloes from 1975 to 1978. He rushed 136 times for 538 yards and five touchdowns as a freshman in 1975. He totaled 148 carries for 725 yards and three touchdowns in 1976. Robinson recorded 201 rushing attempts for 1,399 yards and 12 touchdown in 1977, leading the Missouri Valley Conference in all three categories. He rushed 168 times for 880 yards and three touchdowns his senior year in 1978.

== Professional career ==
Robinson was selected by the Detroit Lions in the third round, with the 67th overall pick, of the 1979 NFL draft. He played in 14 games, starting 12, for the Lions during his rookie year in 1979, rushing 87 times for 302 yards and two touchdowns while also catching 14 passes for 118 yards. He appeared in 14 games again in 1980, recording three carries for two yards. He was released by the Lions on August 31, 1981.

Robinson signed with the Atlanta Falcons on September 9, 1981. He played in 15 games during the 1981 season, rushing nine times for 24 yards. He appeared in nine games for the Falcons in 1982, totaling 19 rushing attempts for 108 yards and seven receptions for 55 yards and two touchdowns. Robinson also appeared in one playoff game that season but did not record any statistics. He played in 12 games, starting nine, in 1983, rushing three times for nine yards while catching 12 passes for 100 yards. He was waived by the Falcons on August 27, 1984.

Robinson was claimed off waivers by the New England Patriots on August 28, 1984. He played in all 16 games, starting one, for the Patriots in 1984, recording four receptions for 32 yards and a touchdown. He was placed on injured reserve on September 2, 1985, and spent the entire 1985 season there. The next year, he was placed on injured reserve again on August 19, 1986, before being released on September 20, 1986.
