= National Register of Historic Places listings in Dawson County, Texas =

Location of Dawson County in Texas

This is a list of the National Register of Historic Places listings in Dawson County, Texas.

This is intended to be a complete list of properties and districts listed on the National Register of Historic Places in Dawson County, Texas. One district is listed on the National Register in the county.

This National Park Service list is complete through NPS recent listings posted March 21, 2025.

== Current listings ==
The locations of National Register properties and districts may be seen in a mapping service provided.

	Name on the Register	Image	Date listed	Location	City or town	Description
1	Lamesa Farm Workers Community Historic District	Lamesa Farm Workers Community Historic District	August 9, 1993 (#93000771)	Approx 1 mile north of the junction of US 87 and US 180; 32°43′08″N 101°55′04″W	Los Ybanez	

== See also ==
- National Register of Historic Places listings in Texas
- Recorded Texas Historic Landmarks in Dawson County
