= Dawson High School (Welch, Texas) =

Location
- 600 Brownfield Highway; Welch, Texas 79377-0180; United States; 32.931921°N 102.123971°W

Information
- Type: Public
- School district: Dawson Independent School District
- Superintendent: Stacy Henderson
- Teaching staff: 13.35 (on an FTE basis)
- Grades: PK-12
- Enrollment: 132 (2023-2024)
- Student to teacher ratio: 9.89
- Colors: Purple & white
- Athletics conference: UIL Class A
- Mascot: Dragon
- Website: Dawson High School

Dawson High School is a public high school located in unincorporated Welch, Texas (USA) and classified as a 1A school by the University Interscholastic League. It is part of the Dawson Independent School District that covers the northwest portion of Dawson County. In 2013, the school was rated "Met Standard" by the Texas Education Agency.

== Athletics ==
The Dawson Dragons compete in the following sports:

- Basketball
- Cheerleading
- Cross country
- 6-man football
- Golf
- Tennis
- Track and field
