= Jerry Taff =

American journalist (1940–2025)

- Born: Gerald Edward Teaff; September 9, 1940; Lamesa, Texas, U.S.
- Died: October 27, 2025 (aged 85); Lubbock, Texas, U.S.
- Education: Texas Tech University
- Occupations: television anchor journalist
- Years active: 1957–2005

Gerald Edward Teaff (September 9, 1940 – October 27, 2025), known professionally as Jerry Taff, was an American television anchorman for WISN-TV in Milwaukee, Wisconsin.

== Early life ==
Taff was raised in Lamesa, Texas. And he also lived in Anadarko, Oklahoma, in the 1940s. His aunt and uncle had a small grocery store south of the school. Taff was a son of Doris (1918-1987) and Edward B. Teaff (1916-1986). He dropped this letter "e" from his surname around 1969. He worked in his grandparents' grocery store which was named Allen's Grocery. Jerry then worked as a bookkeeper at the Cameron Lumber Company, and served in the US Air Force. His family was living in Anadarko Oklahoma from 1942 to 1945, and then they moved to Texas. In 1958 Taff graduated from Lamesa high school and then received a degree in government from Texas Tech in Lubbock in 1962.

== Media career ==
Taff began working in the media at 17, when he worked at KPET in Lamesa. He went on to work at stations in New Haven, Connecticut at WTNH-TV, Flint, Michigan at WJRT-TV and Dallas at WFAA-TV. While working in Flint, Taff covered the story of a local teenager named Michael Moore who had been elected to the school board of Davison, Michigan. Taff mentored Moore and his friends for a year and a half, showing him the news business. Moore later said of Taff: "He was the one media person in a town dominated by General Motors to have the courage to report the truth."

== WISN-TV career ==
Taff joined WISN-TV as anchor in September 1979. He interviewed Jimmy Carter in October 1980. While working at WISN, Taff mentored reporters such as Shaun Robinson, Ben Tracy, and Jason DeRusha. He also taught a course on journalism at Carroll University.

After serving as lead male anchor for WISN-TV for 25 years, Taff retired on May 25, 2005. Taff was inducted into the Milwaukee Media Hall of Fame on October 23, 2009.

== Controversy ==
Taff's parents sued him in a Waukesha County, Wisconsin court in 1985, claiming he owed them nearly $90,000. Though the lawsuit was dismissed, Taff was fired from WISN. The station later re-hired him in 1987.

== Personal life and death ==
Taff lived in New Braunfels, Texas. He had two daughters, Sherry DiAnn Teaff Curtis and Sandra Denise McMahan.

Taff died October 27, 2025, at the age of 85.
