= Dawson Independent School District (Dawson County, Texas) =

School district in Texas

Coordinates: 31.86257°N 96.62035°W

Dawson Independent School District is a public school district based in the community of Welch, Texas (USA).

In addition to Dawson County, it includes sections in Lynn County and Terry County.

In 2009, the school district was rated "academically acceptable" by the Texas Education Agency.

== School ==
The school of Dawson ISD is home to a mere 149 students. Dawson is home to the Dawson Dragons. Most of the school is focused on meeting academic standards while some are more focused on athletics.

== Special programs ==
=== Athletics ===
Dawson High School plays six-man football.

== See also ==
- List of school districts in Texas
