= Lamesa High School =

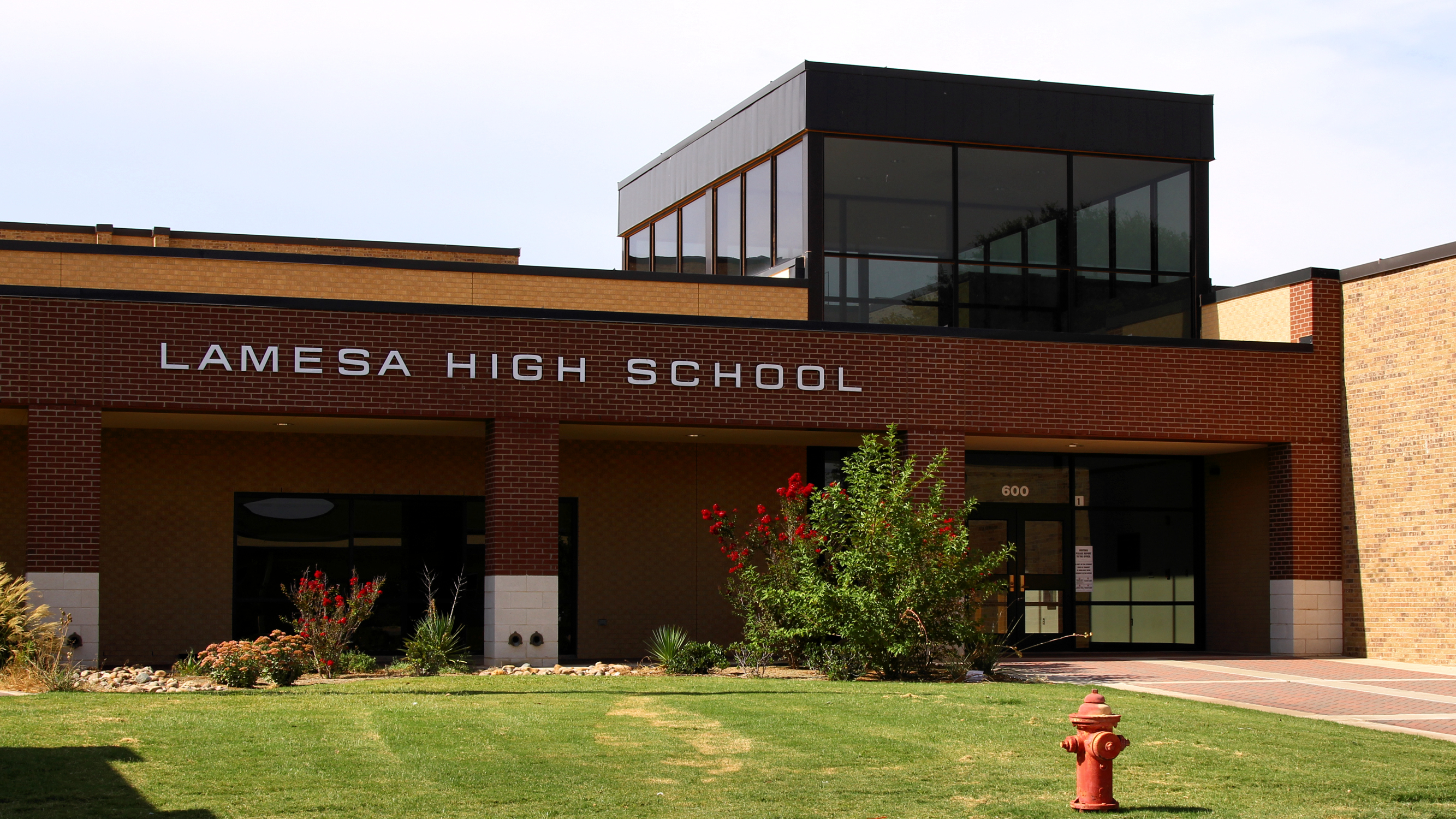

Location
- 600 N 14th St. Lamesa, Texas 79331-3220; United States; 32.746379°N 101.959562°W

Information
- School type: Public High School
- School district: Lamesa Independent School District
- Principal: James Lewallen
- Staff: 65
- Grades: 9-12
- Enrollment: 1,520 (K-12)(2023-2024)
- Colors: Black & Gold
- Athletics conference: UIL Class 3 AAA Div. I
- Mascot: Tornado
- Website: Lamesa High School

Lamesa High School is a public high school located in Lamesa, Texas, and classified as a 3A school by the University Interscholastic League. It is part of the Lamesa Independent School District located in central Dawson County. In 2013, the school received a "B rating" by the Texas Education Agency.

== Athletics ==
The Lamesa Tornadoes compete in these sports:

- Baseball
- Basketball
- Cross-country running
- Football
- Golf
- Powerlifting
- Softball
- Track and field
- Volleyball
- Tennis

=== State titles ===
- Boys basketball - 1960 (3A), 1967 (3A), 1975 (3A)
- Girls golf - 1999 (3A)
- Volleyball - 1986 (4A)

== Notable alumni ==
- Kilmer B. Corbin, attorney and Texas state senator, father of actor Barry Corbin
- Preston Smith, governor of Texas from 1969 to 1972
