= Klondike, Missouri =

Unincorporated community in Missouri, U.S.

Coordinates: 38°34′42″N 90°50′33″W

Klondike is an unincorporated community in southern St. Charles County, in the U.S. state of Missouri.

The community lies above the Missouri River floodplain, east of Augusta. Missouri Route 94 passes to the north of the community and St. Albans lies to the east across the river.

== History ==
A post office called Klondike was established in 1898, and remained in operation until 1943. The former mining community most likely takes its name from Klondike, Yukon.

== See also ==
- Klondike Park (St. Charles County)
