= Hindman, Texas =

- Unincorporated community
- Location within Texas Location within the United States
- Coordinates: 32°53′10″N 101°52′42″W
- Country: United States
- State: Texas
- County: Dawson
- Elevation: 2,995 ft (913 m)
- Time zone: UTC-6 (Central (CST))
  - Summer (DST): UTC-5 (CDT)
- Area code: 806
- GNIS feature ID: 1378455

Hindman is an unincorporated community in Dawson County, Texas, United States.
