= Klondike Independent School District =

School district in Texas

Coordinates: 32.5649°N 101.9585°W

Klondike Independent School District is a public school district located in southwestern Dawson County, Texas (USA). The district also serves most of northern Martin County.

In 2009, the school district was rated "recognized" by the Texas Education Agency. In 2010, Klondike ISD was recognized as an Exemplary District by the Texas Education Agency.

== Special programs ==
=== Athletics ===
Klondike High School plays six-man football.
