= Klondike, DeKalb County, Georgia =

Unincorporated community in Georgia, U.S.

Coordinates: 33°38′44″N 84°07′36″W

Klondike is an unincorporated community in DeKalb County, in the U.S. state of Georgia.

== History ==
The community was named from the Klondike Gold Rush.
