= KPET =

Radio station in Lamesa, Texas

- Lamesa, Texas; United States
- Broadcast area: Lamesa, Texas & Terry, Lynn, Garza, and Borden Counties
- Frequency: 690 kHz
- Branding: Country & More

Programming
- Format: Country/News/Sports
- Affiliations: ABC, Texas State Network

Ownership
- Owner: Dawson County Broadcasting LLC (David Stewart); (DCB License Sub LLC)

History
- First air date: 1947
- Call sign meaning: PETroleum

Technical information
- Licensing authority: FCC
- Facility ID: 71649
- Class: B
- Power: 250 watts (unlimited)
- Transmitter coordinates: 32°42′27″N 101°56′11″W
- Translators: (94.9 MHz) K235CZ (Lamesa) (105.1 MHz) K286AO (Lamesa)

Links
- Public license information: Public file; LMS

KPET (690 AM) is a radio station licensed to serve Lamesa, Texas, United States. The station is owned by Dawson County Broadcasting LLC/DCB License Sub LLC. The station's 280-foot tower is located at the south edge of the city of Lamesa.

== FM Translator ==
Programming is simulcast on FM translators:

Broadcast translators for KPET
Call sign	Frequency	City of license	FID	ERP (W)	Class	FCC info
K235CZ	94.9 FM	Lamesa, Texas	202619	250	D	LMS
K286AO	105.1 FM	Lamesa, Texas	153725	250	D	LMS

== Programming ==
KPET's plays country music, play-by-play sports and news. It operates 24 hours a day on 94.9 FM, 690 AM, and on Northland Cable across the area. The host of morning show is Mike Martini with Danny Moffat news.

Don Sitton worked at KPET for 29 years. He died October 13, 2018, of cancer.

KPET has previously aired Lamesa High School sports, Texas Tech Red Raiders basketball and football, and Texas Rangers Major League baseball.

== History ==
The call letters stand for "PET"roleum, found and pumped in nearby oil fields (Texas Permian Basin). The station was authorized by the FCC in 1946, and went on the air around May 10, 1947. The founders were Kermit S. Ashby, R. O. Parker, and R. A. Woodson doing business as Lamesa Broadcasting Company. Mr. Ashby was onetime owner or cofounder of several Texas stations, including KPET; 1400 AM KVOP Plainview, Texas; and 1050 AM KCAS Slaton, Texas. The studios were located on South First street, west of the town square and the tower sat/sits on a high knoll overlooking the city of Lamesa. Studios are now at the tower, directly above Sulphur Draw, which forms the headwaters of the Colorado River, one of the main rivers in Texas. The station has had the same call letters since it signed on in 1947.

The station was later owned by the Parkers and the Bradburys. In 1959, Thomas E. Conner and Bob Bradbury purchased KHEM and KFNE (FM) in Big Spring, Texas. In 1960, they bought KPET. They reorganized as The Cobra Corp. in 1963. Thomas E. Conner purchased the station on October 1, 1968, as The Conner Corporation. An FM station on 100.3 was added in 1966 (founded as KPET-FM, changed to KELE in early 1969, and voluntarily taken off air in 1972 or 1973); the station was sold in 1973 to a company headquartered in Dallas.

Don Sitton acquired the station in 1989 and was known as "The Voice of Lamesa." He remained with the station until his death in 2018.

It was acquired by the previous owners in January 2008.

The station founded and later spun off stations now known as KMMX (FM) Tahoka, Texas (Lubbock area) and KTXC Lamesa (Midland–Odessa area). KPET works with the schools in its home area, including the Lamesa Independent School District, Klondike schools, Odonnell School District, Sands schools, and Borden County schools. It has broadcast programs of the churches of Lamesa for more than 70 years.

The station went off the air in the summer of 2023 when David Stewart, the co-owner and operator at the time, unexpectedly died. It was resurrected in the summer of 2024 by co-owner Fred Morton.
