= Klondike, Hall County, Georgia =

Unincorporated community in Georgia, U.S.

Coordinates: 34°11′43″N 83°46′42″W

Klondike is an unincorporated community in Hall County, in the U.S. state of Georgia.

== History ==
The community took its name from a product produced by the Adams Canning Company.
