= Welch, Texas =

Census-designate place in Dawson County, Texas, United States

- Census-designated place
- Location in Texas
- Coordinates: 32°55′35″N 102°07′38″W
- Country: United States
- State: Texas
- County: Dawson County

Area
  - Total: 1.5 sq mi (3.8 km^{2})
  - Land: 1.5 sq mi (3.8 km^{2})
  - Water: 0 sq mi (0.0 km^{2})
- Elevation: 3,120 ft (950 m)

Population (2010)
  - Total: 222
  - Density: 152/sq mi (58.7/km^{2})
- Time zone: UTC−06:00 (Central Time)
  - Summer (DST): UTC−05:00 (Mountain Time)
- ZIP Code: 79377
- Area code: 806

Welch is a census-designated place in Dawson County, Texas, United States. As of the 2020 census, Welch had a population of 234.

The Dawson Independent School District serves area students.

== Demographics ==
Historical population
Census	Pop.	Note	%±
2010	222		—
2020	234		5.4%
U.S. Decennial Census; 1850–1900 1910; 1920 1930 1940; 1950 1960 1970; 1980 1990 2000; 2010 2020

Welch first appeared as a census designated place in the 2010 U.S. census.

Welch CDP, Texas – Racial and ethnic composition Note: the US Census treats Hispanic/Latino as an ethnic category. This table excludes Latinos from the racial categories and assigns them to a separate category. Hispanics/Latinos may be of any race.
Race / Ethnicity (NH = Non-Hispanic)	Pop 2010	Pop 2020	% 2010	% 2020
White alone (NH)	106	117	47.75%	50.00%
Black or African American alone (NH)	0	0	0.00%	0.00%
Native American or Alaska Native alone (NH)	0	0	0.00%	0.00%
Asian alone (NH)	0	0	0.00%	0.00%
Native Hawaiian or Pacific Islander alone (NH)	0	0	0.00%	0.00%
Other race alone (NH)	0	0	0.00%	0.00%
Mixed race or Multiracial (NH)	1	5	0.45%	2.14%
Hispanic or Latino (any race)	115	112	51.80%	47.86%
Total	222	234	100.00%	100.00%

== See also ==
- List of census-designated places in Texas
