= Los Ybanez, Texas =

- City
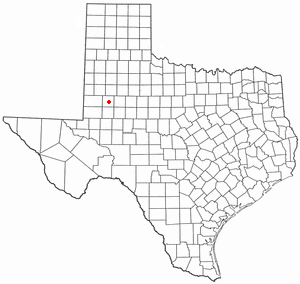
- Location of Los Ybanez, Texas

- Coordinates: 32°43′5″N 101°55′9″W
- Country: United States
- State: Texas
- County: Dawson

Area
  - Total: 0.085 sq mi (0.22 km^{2})
  - Land: 0.085 sq mi (0.22 km^{2})
  - Water: 0 sq mi (0.00 km^{2})
- Elevation: 2,972 ft (906 m)

Population (2020)
  - Total: 28
  - Density: 330/sq mi (130/km^{2})
- Time zone: UTC-6 (Central (CST))
  - Summer (DST): UTC-5 (CDT)
- FIPS code: 48-44170
- GNIS feature ID: 1388571

Los Ybanez is a city in Dawson County, Texas, United States. The population was 28 at the 2020 census.

== Geography ==
According to the United States Census Bureau, the city has a total area of 0.1 square miles (26 ha), all land.

== History ==
Los Ybanez was organized in the late 1970s (formally incorporated in 1983) as one of several Texas municipalities that were organized in order to legalize local sale of alcoholic spirits. These were usually small areas of land, adjacent to larger towns or cities. Others included Impact near Abilene, TX and Orbit near Monahans, TX.

Texas law provides that all its 254 counties are essentially "dry"; that is, liquor sales are not allowed. Local governments can opt for these sales through "local option" elections. The western half of Texas is generally and historically dry, though as the metro areas grew, most allow liquor in clubs, some on sale in stores.

Los Ybanez was founded by members of the family of Israel G. and Mary Ybanez. Ybanez purchased a tract of land outside all towns from the state of Texas (which had obtained title from the federal government after World War II.) The land had been used for soldiers' barracks during military training exercises at an adjoining glider base. Family members were moved to the land to occupy the houses and establish residency. Later they incorporated as a town, got a US Post Office, and legalized liquor sales. The store operates to this day as a drive through only operation, accepting only cash.

The Ybanez family also founded a local radio station, KYMI (later KJJT) as a vehicle for advertising for the liquor store business. KYMI began on 107.9 MHz, but moved to 98.5 in 1996 when a station in Odessa upgraded facilities. KYMI received money for a new transmitter and antenna in return for agreeing to change channels.

== Demographics ==
Historical population
Census	Pop.	Note	%±
1990	83		—
2000	32		−61.4%
2010	19		−40.6%
2020	28		47.4%
U.S. Decennial Census; 1850–1900 1910; 1920 1930 1940; 1950 1960 1970; 1980 1990 2000; 2010 2020

=== 2020 census ===
As of the 2020 census, Los Ybanez had a population of 28. The median age was 35.5 years. 25.0% of residents were under the age of 18 and 14.3% of residents were 65 years of age or older. For every 100 females there were 115.4 males, and for every 100 females age 18 and over there were 133.3 males age 18 and over.

0.0% of residents lived in urban areas, while 100.0% lived in rural areas.

There were 8 households in Los Ybanez, of which 50.0% had children under the age of 18 living in them. Of all households, 37.5% were married-couple households, 12.5% were households with a male householder and no spouse or partner present, and 37.5% were households with a female householder and no spouse or partner present. About 12.5% of all households were made up of individuals and 12.5% had someone living alone who was 65 years of age or older.

There were 8 housing units, of which 0.0% were vacant. The homeowner vacancy rate was 0.0% and the rental vacancy rate was 0.0%.

Racial composition as of the 2020 census
Race	Number	Percent
White	17	60.7%
Black or African American	3	10.7%
American Indian and Alaska Native	1	3.6%
Asian	0	0.0%
Native Hawaiian and Other Pacific Islander	0	0.0%
Some other race	0	0.0%
Two or more races	7	25.0%
Hispanic or Latino (of any race)	19	67.9%

=== 2000 census ===
As of the census of 2000, there were 32 people, 10 households, and 9 families residing in the city. The population density was 365.1 inhabitants per square mile (141.0/km^{2}). There were 12 housing units at an average density of 136.9 per square mile (52.9/km^{2}). The racial makeup of the city was 50.00% White, 6.25% African American, 21.88% from other races, and 21.88% from two or more races. Hispanic or Latino of any race were 75.00% of the population.

There were 10 households, out of which 40.0% had children under the age of 18 living with them, 60.0% were married couples living together, 20.0% had a female householder with no husband present, and 10.0% were non-families. 10.0% of all households were made up of individuals, and 10.0% had someone living alone who was 65 years of age or older. The average household size was 3.20 and the average family size was 3.44.

In the city, the population was spread out, with 31.3% under the age of 18, 12.5% from 18 to 24, 21.9% from 25 to 44, 31.3% from 45 to 64, and 3.1% who were 65 years of age or older. The median age was 27 years. For every 100 females, there were 100.0 males. For every 100 females age 18 and over, there were 83.3 males.

The median income for a household in the city was $11,250, and the median income for a family was $11,250. Males had a median income of $9,750 versus $0 for females. The per capita income for the city was $22,324. There were 50.0% of families and 56.8% of the population living below the poverty line, including 100.0% of under eighteens and none of those over 64.

== Education ==
The City of Los Ybanez is served by the Lamesa Independent School District.
