= Klondike Park (St. Charles County) =

- Interactive map of Klondike Park
- Type: County park
- Location: St. Charles County, Missouri, United States
- Coordinates: 38.582°N 90.833°W
- Area: 250 acres (100 ha)
- Created: 1999
- Status: Open all year (7:00 a.m. to half an hour after sunset)
- Website: Klondike Park

Klondike Park is a county park in St. Charles County, Missouri. The park offers access to hiking and cycling trails including the Katy Trail. Camping and fishing facilities are also available. Klondike park also has a very diverse set of wildlife and habitats.

== History ==
Klondike Park was originally a silica sand quarry, but was restored to its natural condition by St. Charles County Parks. One unique feature of the park is the powdery white silica sand. This substance was mined to be blown into glass when the park was still an operating silica mine.

The Lewis and Clark Expedition passed along what would be the park's northern border in 1804. The expedition stopped at nearby Tavern Rock on May 23, 1804, and again on September 21, 1806.

The land was originally owned by Wilhelm (William) Engelage. The park is located on the site of the old Klondike Sandstone Quarry, which was founded in 1898 when the Tavern Rock Sand Company acquired the land. This location is on the eastern end of a 45-mile belt of St. Peter Sandstone. The sandstone was found well below ground level so the surface rock, Joachim dolomite, needed to be removed to access the sandstone. The sandstone was crushed on site, and then shipped by railroad to be used in the manufacture of glass. The quarry closed in 1983. St. Charles County purchased the land in 1999.

Cliffs and bluffs are made of limestone and sandstone. There are many warning signs on cliffs due to numerous deaths of cliffs giving away to weight.

== Location ==
Klondike Park is located along the Missouri River. Klondike Park is located next to the Katy Trail State Park, and the rail runs through the park.

== Activities ==
The park features six different cabins that can host up to eight guests each, and over forty campsites with restrooms and shower houses.

== Wildlife ==
One of the most popular locations in the park is the large lake. The lake resides in what used to be the quarry itself, and was filled with water after being purchased by the St. Charles County Parks Department; this was likely a combination of both rain water accumulation and the use of artificial means. During its operation, the quarry mined silica sand from the St. Peter Sandstone formation, and the bright, white sand can be seen around the lake today. The park has many different habitats for wildlife such as the large lake, riparian forest, emergent wetland, and grassland. Different animals and life forms call Klondike Park their home. Shorebirds and waterfowl can be found on the lake’s edge, along with sunfish, channel catfish, bluegill, and largemouth bass found in the park's lakes. There are also multiple types of woodpeckers, such as hairy, downy, and red-bellied woodpeckers, which can be found around the park. The grassland areas attract white-throated sparrow, dickcissel, and eastern meadowlark. Bald eagles, northern harrier, red-tailed hawk, red-shouldered hawk, and other birds-of-prey frequent the varied habitats in the park. Great blue heron, green heron, and great egret can be found on the pond's shoreline. Pied-billed grebe, Canada geese, and mallards use the deeper water in the center. There are many different kinds of plants, including horsetail (puzzlegrass).

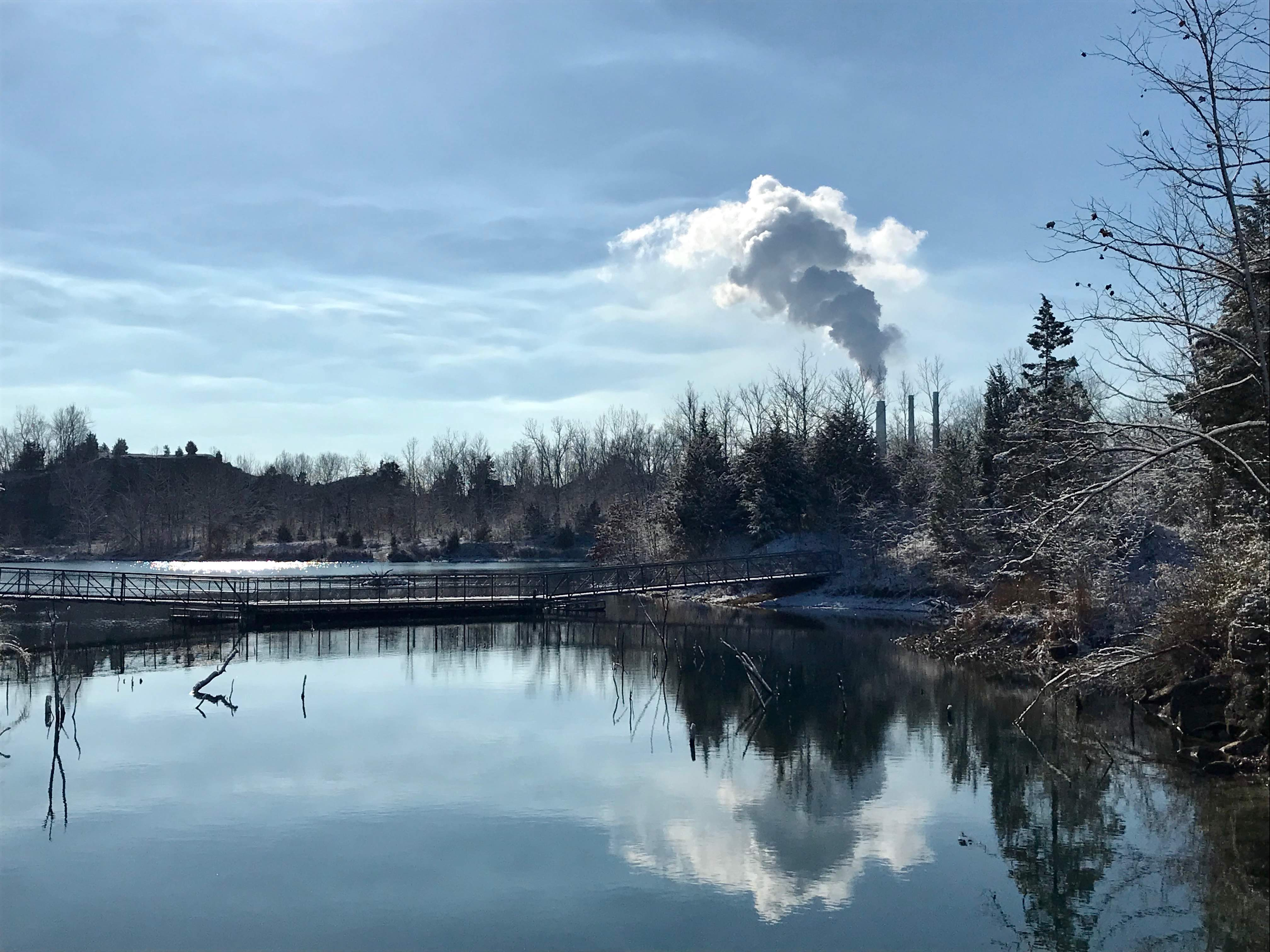
Klondike Park lake in winter.

== Photos ==
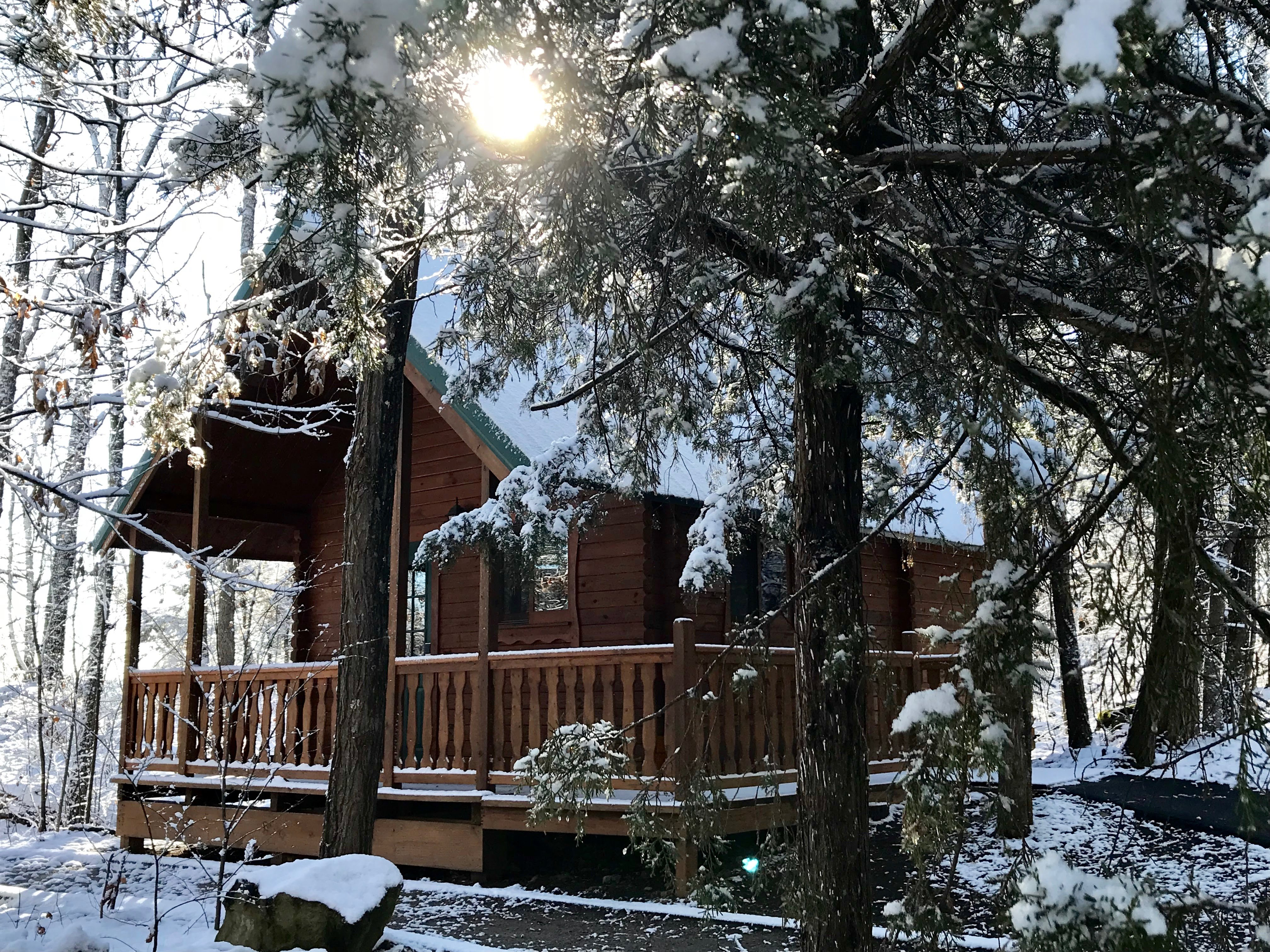
Cabin at Klondike Park, Charles County in the winter time

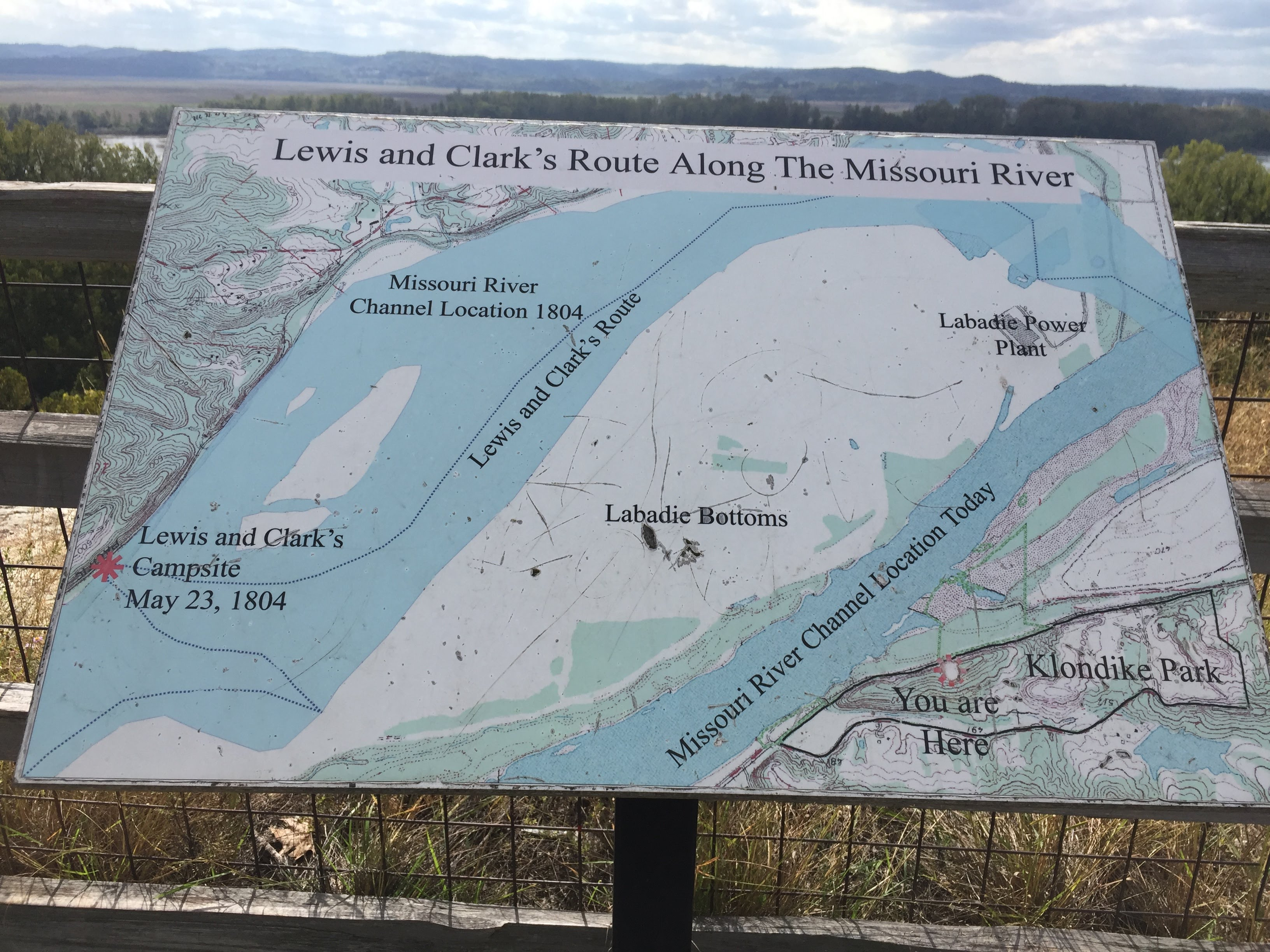
Lewis and Clark route signage, Klondike Park, St. Charles, MO
