= Klondike derby =

Annual winter Scouting event

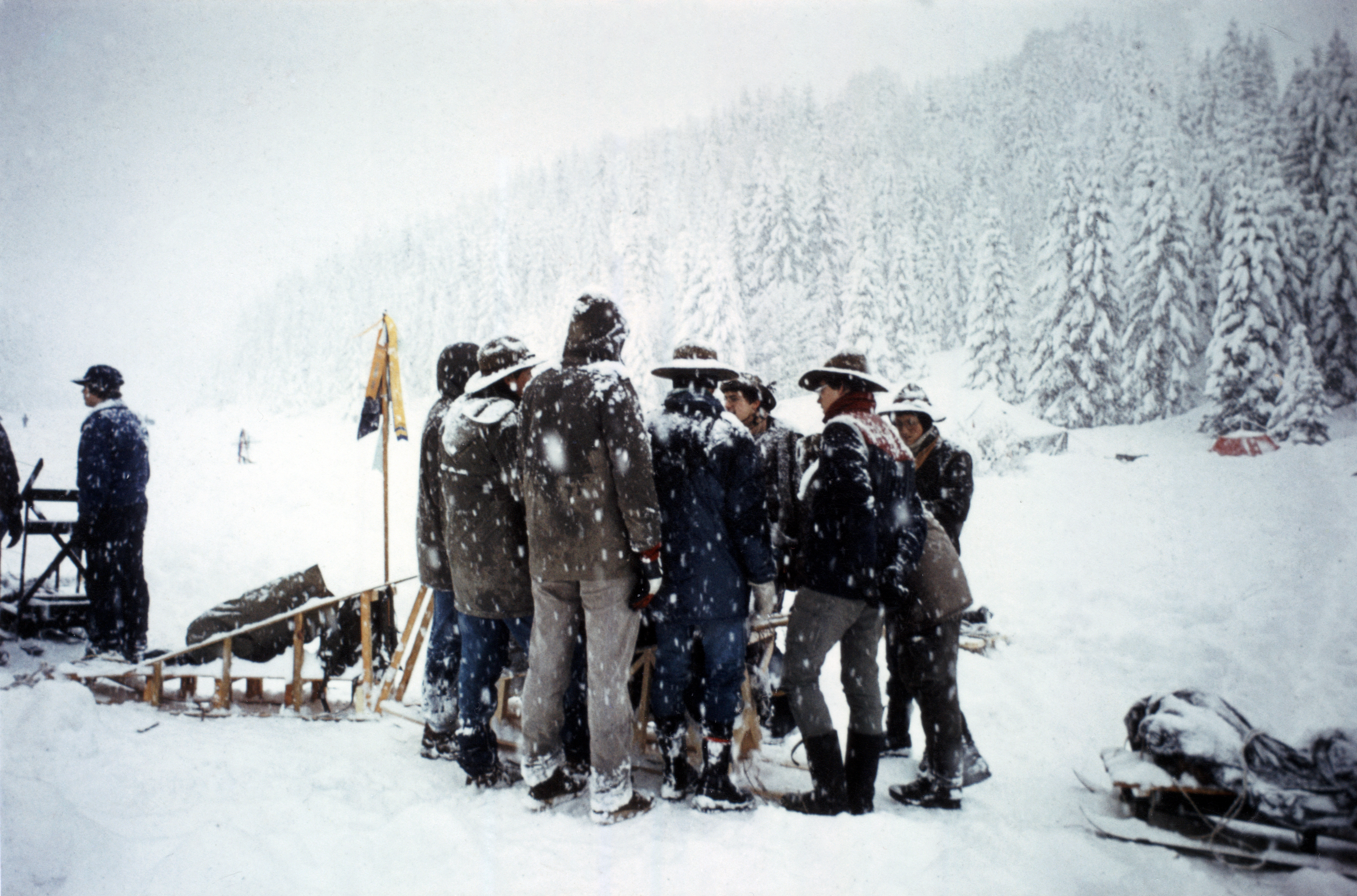
- The Klondike derby of the BSA Transatlantic Council at Germany, 1984 near Garmisch-Partenkirchen: German Scouts of the Deutsche Pfadfinderschaft Sankt Georg.
- Owner: Local councils of Scouting America
- Country: United States, Canada
- Date: Winter

A Klondike derby is an annual event held by some Scouting America and Scouts Canada districts during the winter months and is based on the heritage of the Klondike Gold Rush. Scouting America units have been running Klondike derbies since 1949.

The event varies by district, but the typical Klondike derby consists of several stations where patrols/units must test their Scoutcraft skills and their leadership abilities, earning points towards a total score. Often, one or more races are included while the Scouts navigate between stations.

The unit must transport their gear on a homemade sled pulled by the Scouts. In the case where there is not sufficient snow on the ground, many sleds use wheels in the place of skis. Districts may have specific guidelines for the construction of sleds.

== Variations ==
Extreme Klondike! is a front-country (in contrast with backcountry), up-to-24-hour, cold-weather, personal and team challenge for older Scouts and Venturers often held in conjunction with Klondike Derby. The aim of this variation is to increase/sustain older youth participation. Part backpacking, part survival, and/or part winter camping, the mini-High-Adventure Extreme Klondike! Collection of events aims to replicate trail life in the Great Northwest by presenting a wide range of basic-skill, higher-standard challenges, letting the Scout-led team decide who, when and how to complete each event.
