= Dawson County, Texas =

County in Texas, United States

- County
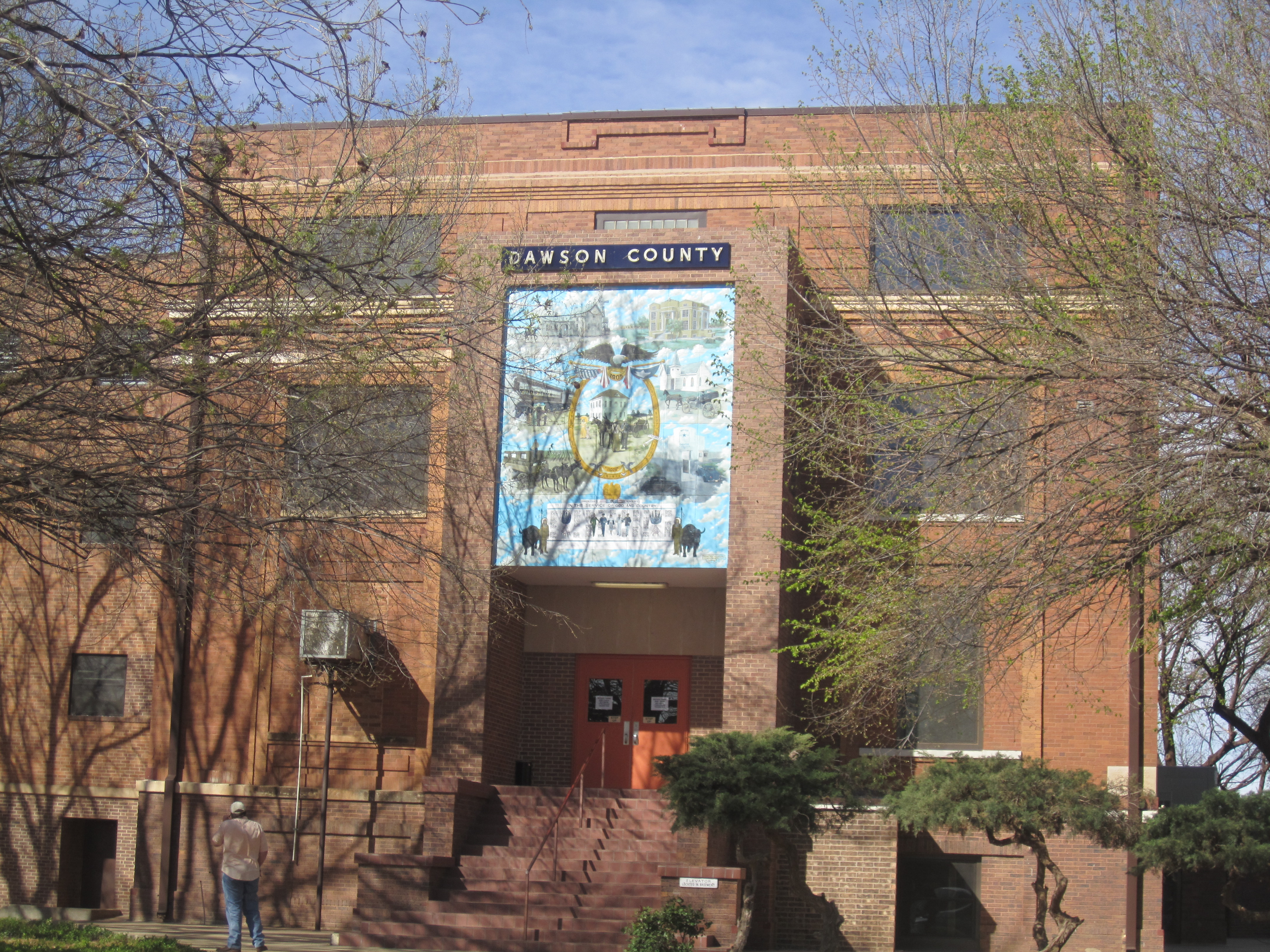
- The Dawson County Courthouse in Lamesa

- Location within the U.S. state of Texas
- Coordinates: 32°44′N 101°57′W
- Country: United States
- State: Texas
- Founded: 1905
- Named for: Nicholas Mosby Dawson
- Seat: Lamesa
- Largest city: Lamesa

Area
  - Total: 902 sq mi (2,340 km^{2})
  - Land: 900 sq mi (2,300 km^{2})
  - Water: 1.8 sq mi (4.7 km^{2}) 0.2%

Population (2020)
  - Total: 12,456
  - Estimate (2025): 11,776 ▼
  - Density: 14/sq mi (5.3/km^{2})
- Time zone: UTC−6 (Central)
  - Summer (DST): UTC−5 (CDT)
- Congressional district: 19th
- Website: www.co.dawson.tx.us

Dawson County is a county in the U.S. state of Texas. As of the 2020 census, its population was 12,456. The county seat is Lamesa. The county was created in 1876 and later organized in 1905. It is named for Nicholas Mosby Dawson, a soldier of the Texas Revolution. Dawson County comprises the Lamesa, Texas micropolitan statistical area (μSA), and by population is the smallest μSA in the United States.

== History ==
A Dawson County was founded in 1856 from Kinney County, Maverick County, and Uvalde County, but was divided in 1866 between Kinney and Uvalde Counties. The current Dawson County was founded in 1876.

In 1943, the discovery well for the Spraberry Trend, the third-largest oil field in the United States by remaining reserves, was drilled in Dawson County on land owned by farmer Abner Spraberry, for whom the geological formation and associated field were named. While most of the oil fields are in the counties to the south, a small portion of the Spraberry Trend is in Dawson County. Production on the field did not begin until 1949, and by 1951, an oil boom was underway in the area, with Midland at its center.

Like all Texas counties as stipulated in the Texas Constitution of 1876, Dawson County has four commissioners chosen by single-member district and a countywide-elected county judge, the chief administrator of the county.

== Geography ==
According to the U.S. Census Bureau, the county has an area of 902 square miles (2,340 km^{2}), of which 1.8 square miles (4.7 km^{2}) (0.2%) are covered by water.

=== Major highways ===
- U.S. Highway 87
- U.S. Highway 180
- State Highway 83
- State Highway 115
- State Highway 137
- State Highway 349

=== Adjacent counties ===
- Lynn County (north)
- Borden County (east)
- Howard County (southeast)
- Martin County (south)
- Gaines County (west)
- Terry County (northwest)

== Demographics ==
Historical population
Census	Pop.	Note	%±
1880	24		—
1890	29		20.8%
1900	37		27.6%
1910	2,320		6,170.3%
1920	4,309		85.7%
1930	13,573		215.0%
1940	15,367		13.2%
1950	19,113		24.4%
1960	19,185		0.4%
1970	16,604		−13.5%
1980	16,184		−2.5%
1990	14,349		−11.3%
2000	14,985		4.4%
2010	13,833		−7.7%
2020	12,456		−10.0%
2025 (est.)	11,776	▼	−5.5%
U.S. Decennial Census; 1850–2010 2010 2020

Dawson County, Texas – Racial and ethnic composition Note: the US Census treats Hispanic/Latino as an ethnic category. This table excludes Latinos from the racial categories and assigns them to a separate category. Hispanics/Latinos may be of any race.
Race / Ethnicity (NH = Non-Hispanic)	Pop 2000	Pop 2010	Pop 2020	% 2000	% 2010	% 2020
White alone (NH)	6,439	5,402	4,590	42.37%	39.05%	36.85%
Black or African American alone (NH)	1,285	860	847	8.58%	6.22%	6.80%
Native American or Alaska Native alone (NH)	23	28	23	0.15%	0.20%	0.18%
Asian alone (NH)	32	46	56	0.21%	0.33%	0.45%
Pacific Islander alone (NH)	0	2	4	0.00%	0.01%	0.03%
Other race alone (NH)	10	13	17	0.07%	0.09%	0.14%
Multiracial (NH)	64	95	152	0.43%	0.69%	1.22%
Hispanic or Latino (any race)	7,222	7,387	6,767	48.19%	53.40%	54.33%
Total	14,985	13,833	12,456	100.00%	100.00%	100.00%

=== 2020 census ===
As of the 2020 census, the county had a population of 12,456, with a median age of 37.3 years; 24.1% of residents were under the age of 18 and 16.8% were 65 years of age or older, and for every 100 females there were 120.7 males while 128.3 males were present for every 100 females age 18 and over.

The racial makeup of the county was 61.1% White, 7.2% Black or African American, 0.8% American Indian and Alaska Native, 0.4% Asian, <0.1% Native Hawaiian and Pacific Islander, 14.6% from some other race, and 15.8% from two or more races, while Hispanic or Latino residents of any race comprised 54.3% of the population.

Seventy.1 percent of residents lived in urban areas and 29.9% lived in rural areas.

There were 4,079 households, of which 34.5% had children under the age of 18. Of all households, 49.0% were married-couple households, 18.1% were households with a male householder and no spouse or partner present, and 27.1% were households with a female householder and no spouse or partner present; about 26.8% of all households were made up of individuals and 13.5% had someone living alone who was 65 years of age or older.

There were 4,859 housing units, 16.1% of which were vacant; among occupied units, 72.4% were owner-occupied and 27.6% were renter-occupied, with a homeowner vacancy rate of 1.8% and a rental vacancy rate of 15.6%.

=== 2000 census ===
As of the 2000 census, 14,985 people, 4,726 households, and 3,501 families lived in the county. The population density was 17 people per square mile (6.6 people/km^{2}). There were 5,500 housing units at an average density of 6 units per square mile (2.3/km^{2}). The racial makeup of the county was 72.47% White, 8.66% Black or African American, 0.30% Native American, 0.25% Asian, 16.56% from other races, and 1.77% from two or more races, while about 48.19% of the population were Hispanic or Latino of any race.

Of the 4,726 households, 35.1% had children under 18 living with them, 59.4% were married couples living together, 11.0% had a female householder with no husband present, and 25.9% were not families. About 23.9% of all households were made up of individuals, and 13.3% had someone living alone who was 65 or older. The average household size was 2.69 and the average family size was 3.20.

In the county, the population was distributed as 25.6% under 18, 8.9% from 18 to 24, 30.7% from 25 to 44, 20.5% from 45 to 64, and 14.3% who were 65 or older. The median age was 36 years. For every 100 females, there were 124.30 males. For every 100 females age 18 and over, there were 129.90 males.

The median income for a household in the county was $28,211, and for a family was $32,745. Males had a median income of $27,259 versus $16,739 for females. The per capita income for the county was $15,011. About 16.40% of families and 19.70% of the population were below the poverty line, including 29.20% of those under age 18 and 12.80% of those age 65 or over.

== Communities ==
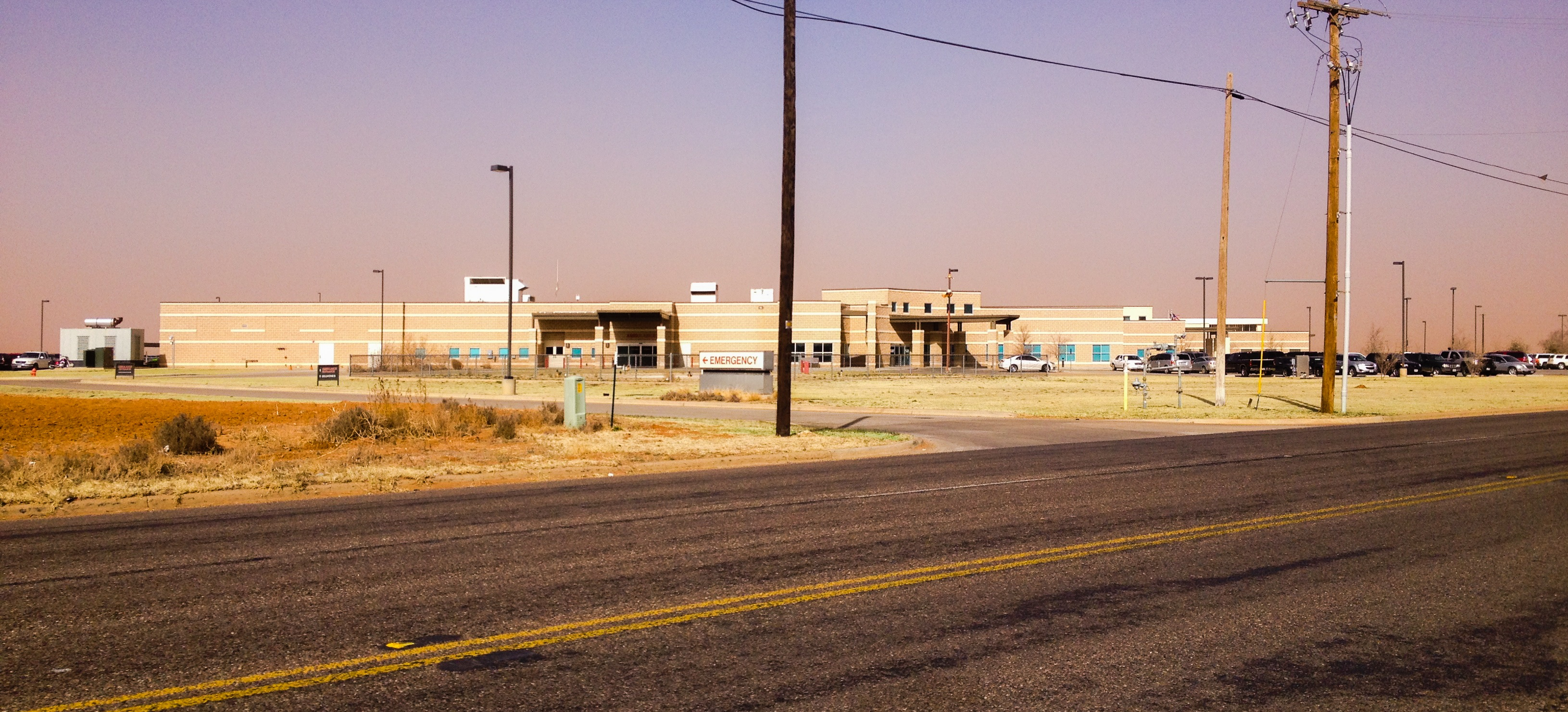
Medical Arts Hospital in Lamesa serves Dawson County residents.

=== Cities ===
- Ackerly (partly in Martin County)
- Lamesa (county seat)
- Los Ybanez
- O'Donnell (mostly in Lynn County)

=== Census-designated place ===
- Welch

=== Unincorporated communities ===
- Arvana
- Hindman
- Key
- Klondike
- Midway
- Mungerville
- Patricia
- Sparenberg

=== Ghost towns ===
- Pride
- Sand

== Politics ==
Dawson County is located within District 82 of the Texas House of Representatives. Dawson County is located within District 31 of the Texas Senate.

United States presidential election results for Dawson County, Texas
Year	Republican		Democratic		Third party(ies)	
Year	No.	%	No.	%	No.	%
1912	7	8.14%	74	86.05%	5	5.81%
1916	14	4.40%	288	90.57%	16	5.03%
1920	75	17.90%	296	70.64%	48	11.46%
1924	185	14.24%	1,079	83.06%	35	2.69%
1928	1,448	77.23%	427	22.77%	0	0.00%
1932	153	8.44%	1,659	91.51%	1	0.06%
1936	156	7.83%	1,829	91.82%	7	0.35%
1940	361	11.37%	2,808	88.47%	5	0.16%
1944	472	16.43%	2,149	74.83%	251	8.74%
1948	393	12.51%	2,605	82.94%	143	4.55%
1952	2,388	53.29%	2,093	46.71%	0	0.00%
1956	1,615	44.01%	2,049	55.83%	6	0.16%
1960	2,161	50.89%	2,063	48.59%	22	0.52%
1964	1,691	34.74%	3,171	65.14%	6	0.12%
1968	2,091	46.33%	1,522	33.72%	900	19.94%
1972	3,247	79.29%	846	20.66%	2	0.05%
1976	2,474	53.17%	2,162	46.46%	17	0.37%
1980	3,267	62.77%	1,867	35.87%	71	1.36%
1984	3,685	67.21%	1,781	32.48%	17	0.31%
1988	3,154	59.32%	2,155	40.53%	8	0.15%
1992	2,691	55.43%	1,639	33.76%	525	10.81%
1996	2,319	55.53%	1,612	38.60%	245	5.87%
2000	3,337	68.96%	1,463	30.23%	39	0.81%
2004	3,419	75.23%	1,114	24.51%	12	0.26%
2008	2,906	70.95%	1,152	28.13%	38	0.93%
2012	2,591	71.14%	1,019	27.98%	32	0.88%
2016	2,636	73.98%	835	23.44%	92	2.58%
2020	2,951	77.88%	808	21.32%	30	0.79%
2024	2,810	79.99%	667	18.99%	36	1.02%

United States Senate election results for Dawson County, Texas1
Year	Republican		Democratic		Third party(ies)	
Year	No.	%	No.	%	No.	%
2024	2,686	77.74%	688	19.91%	81	2.34%

United States Senate election results for Dawson County, Texas2
Year	Republican		Democratic		Third party(ies)	
Year	No.	%	No.	%	No.	%
2020	2,827	77.64%	738	20.27%	76	2.09%

Texas Gubernatorial election results for Dawson County
Year	Republican		Democratic		Third party(ies)	
Year	No.	%	No.	%	No.	%
2022	2,088	82.99%	402	15.98%	26	1.03%

== Education ==
School districts serving the county include:

- Dawson Independent School District
- Klondike Independent School District
- Lamesa Independent School District
- O'Donnell Independent School District
- Sands Consolidated Independent School District

The county is in the service area of Howard County Junior College.

== See also ==
- Dry counties
- National Register of Historic Places listings in Dawson County, Texas
- Recorded Texas Historic Landmarks in Dawson County
