= Klondike, Dawson County, Texas =

Klondike, Texas
- Unincorporated community
- Location within Texas Location within the United States
- Coordinates: 32°33′32″N 101°57′26″W
- Country: United States
- State: Texas
- County: Dawson
- Elevation: 2,884 ft (879 m)
- Time zone: UTC-6 (Central (CST))
  - Summer (DST): UTC-5 (CDT)
- Area code: 806
- GNIS feature ID: 1378529

Klondike (formerly Klondyke) is an unincorporated inhabited place in Dawson County, Texas, United States. It is located about 15 mi south of Lamesa, the county seat, at an elevation of 2884 ft (879 m) above sea level.
