= Lamesa Independent School District =

School district in Texas

Lamesa Independent School District is a public school district based in Lamesa, Texas (USA).

In addition to Lamesa, the district also serves the city of Los Ybanez.

The Lamesa athletic teams are known as the Golden Tornadoes or "Tors" for short. In 2009, the school district was rated "academically acceptable" by the Texas Education Agency.

== Schools ==
- Lamesa High School (Grades 9–12)
- Lamesa Middle School (Grades 6–8)
- North Elementary School (Grades 3–5)
- South Elementary School (Grades PK-2)
