= Lamesa, Texas =

- City
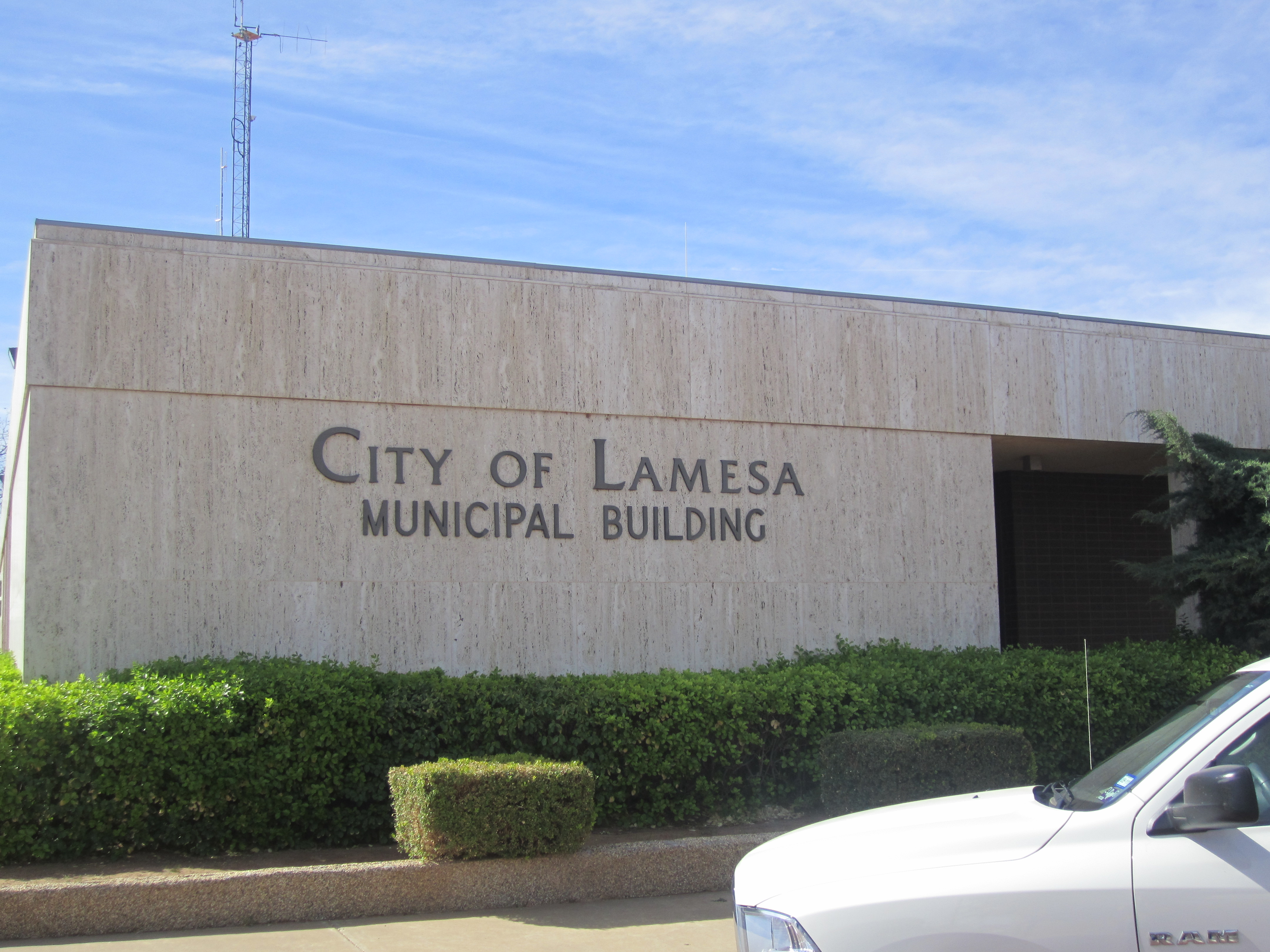
- Lamesa City Hall
- Motto(s): Together, Progress with a Purpose
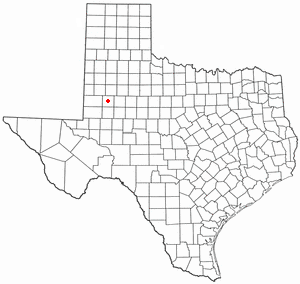
- Location of Lamesa, Texas

- Coordinates: 32°44′4″N 101°57′29″W
- Country: United States
- State: Texas
- County: Dawson

Government
  - Mayor: Hayden Davis

Area
  - Total: 5.14 sq mi (13.31 km^{2})
  - Land: 5.11 sq mi (13.23 km^{2})
  - Water: 0.031 sq mi (0.08 km^{2})
- Elevation: 2,992 ft (912 m)

Population (2020)
  - Total: 8,674
  - Density: 1,791.3/sq mi (691.62/km^{2})
- Time zone: UTC-6 (Central (CST))
  - Summer (DST): UTC-5 (CDT)
- ZIP code: 79331
- Area code: 806
- FIPS code: 48-41164
- GNIS feature ID: 1339590
- Website: www.ci.lamesa.tx.us

Lamesa (/ləˈmiːsə/ lə-MEE-sə) is a city in and the county seat of Dawson County, Texas, United States. Its population was 8,674 at the 2020 census, down from 9,952 at the 2000 census. Located south of Lubbock on the Llano Estacado, Lamesa was founded in 1903. Most of its economy is based on cotton farming. The Preston E. Smith prison unit, named for the former governor of Texas, is located just outside Lamesa.

== Geography ==
According to the United States Census Bureau, the city has a total area of 5.0 square miles (13.0 km^{2}), of which 0.03 square miles (0.08 km^{2}), or 0.62%, is covered by water.

=== Climate ===
According to the Köppen climate classification, Lamesa has a semiarid climate, BSk on climate maps. The town is known for hot summers—frequently topping 100 °F (38 °C)—and cold winter nights (where the temperature goes below freezing on an average of 91 nights). The average annual temperature is 61.4 °F (16.3 °C), making it the ninth-coldest place in Texas after cities such as Amarillo and Lubbock. Lamesa averages 17.6 inches (45 cm) of rain and 4 inches (10 cm) of snow annually.

Climate data for Lamesa, Texas (1991–2020 normals, extremes 1927–2020)
Month	Jan	Feb	Mar	Apr	May	Jun	Jul	Aug	Sep	Oct	Nov	Dec	Year
Record high °F (°C)	84 (29)	91 (33)	95 (35)	103 (39)	109 (43)	114 (46)	111 (44)	111 (44)	106 (41)	101 (38)	92 (33)	86 (30)	114 (46)
Mean maximum °F (°C)	75.8 (24.3)	79.9 (26.6)	87.0 (30.6)	92.3 (33.5)	99.3 (37.4)	103.3 (39.6)	101.9 (38.8)	100.7 (38.2)	97.1 (36.2)	91.5 (33.1)	82.3 (27.9)	74.5 (23.6)	105.3 (40.7)
Mean daily maximum °F (°C)	55.3 (12.9)	60.2 (15.7)	68.5 (20.3)	77.4 (25.2)	85.1 (29.5)	92.4 (33.6)	94.3 (34.6)	93.1 (33.9)	85.4 (29.7)	76.4 (24.7)	64.7 (18.2)	56.3 (13.5)	75.8 (24.3)
Daily mean °F (°C)	40.8 (4.9)	44.7 (7.1)	52.4 (11.3)	60.7 (15.9)	69.8 (21.0)	77.9 (25.5)	80.3 (26.8)	79.0 (26.1)	71.8 (22.1)	61.6 (16.4)	49.7 (9.8)	41.8 (5.4)	60.9 (16.1)
Mean daily minimum °F (°C)	26.2 (−3.2)	29.2 (−1.6)	36.3 (2.4)	44.1 (6.7)	54.5 (12.5)	63.5 (17.5)	66.2 (19.0)	65.0 (18.3)	58.3 (14.6)	46.7 (8.2)	34.8 (1.6)	27.2 (−2.7)	46.0 (7.8)
Mean minimum °F (°C)	14.8 (−9.6)	17.8 (−7.9)	22.3 (−5.4)	31.5 (−0.3)	41.1 (5.1)	56.3 (13.5)	61.4 (16.3)	59.2 (15.1)	46.3 (7.9)	33.2 (0.7)	21.6 (−5.8)	15.4 (−9.2)	11.0 (−11.7)
Record low °F (°C)	−6 (−21)	−12 (−24)	7 (−14)	23 (−5)	28 (−2)	42 (6)	54 (12)	50 (10)	36 (2)	22 (−6)	6 (−14)	−3 (−19)	−12 (−24)
Average precipitation inches (mm)	0.60 (15)	0.75 (19)	1.01 (26)	0.88 (22)	2.09 (53)	2.36 (60)	1.45 (37)	1.60 (41)	2.89 (73)	1.41 (36)	1.04 (26)	0.80 (20)	16.84 (428)
Average snowfall inches (cm)	0.8 (2.0)	0.6 (1.5)	0.0 (0.0)	0.0 (0.0)	0.0 (0.0)	0.0 (0.0)	0.0 (0.0)	0.0 (0.0)	0.0 (0.0)	0.0 (0.0)	0.7 (1.8)	0.5 (1.3)	2.6 (6.6)
Average precipitation days (≥ 0.01 in)	3.0	3.7	3.2	2.9	5.1	5.5	4.6	5.0	5.6	4.1	3.1	2.9	48.7
Average snowy days (≥ 0.1 in)	0.5	0.5	0.0	0.0	0.0	0.0	0.0	0.0	0.0	0.0	0.2	0.4	1.6
Source: NOAA

== Demographics ==
Historical population
Census	Pop.	Note	%±
1920	1,188		—
1930	3,528		197.0%
1940	6,038		71.1%
1950	10,704		77.3%
1960	12,438		16.2%
1970	11,559		−7.1%
1980	11,790		2.0%
1990	10,809		−8.3%
2000	9,952		−7.9%
2010	9,422		−5.3%
2020	8,674		−7.9%
U.S. Decennial Census

=== Racial and ethnic composition ===
Lamesa city, Texas – Racial and ethnic composition Note: the US Census treats Hispanic/Latino as an ethnic category. This table excludes Latinos from the racial categories and assigns them to a separate category. Hispanics/Latinos may be of any race.
Race / Ethnicity (NH = Non-Hispanic)	Pop 2000	Pop 2010	Pop 2020	% 2000	% 2010	% 2020
White alone (NH)	4,171	3,374	2,717	41.91%	35.81%	31.32%
Black or African American alone (NH)	412	401	296	4.14%	4.26%	3.41%
Native American or Alaska Native alone (NH)	16	20	20	0.16%	0.21%	0.23%
Asian alone (NH)	19	39	50	0.19%	0.41%	0.58%
Native Hawaiian or Pacific Islander alone (NH)	0	2	0	0.00%	0.02%	0.00%
Other race alone (NH)	10	8	12	0.10%	0.08%	0.14%
Mixed race or Multiracial (NH)	53	48	123	0.53%	0.51%	1.42%
Hispanic or Latino (any race)	5,271	5,530	5,456	52.96%	58.69%	62.90%
Total	9,952	9,422	8,674	100.00%	100.00%	100.00%

=== 2020 census ===
As of the 2020 census, Lamesa had a population of 8,674. The median age was 37.6 years. 27.4% of residents were under the age of 18 and 18.3% of residents were 65 years of age or older. For every 100 females there were 93.1 males, and for every 100 females age 18 and over there were 88.9 males age 18 and over.

99.3% of residents lived in urban areas, while 0.7% lived in rural areas.

There were 3,307 households in Lamesa, of which 33.8% had children under the age of 18 living in them. Of all households, 45.6% were married-couple households, 18.6% were households with a male householder and no spouse or partner present, and 29.6% were households with a female householder and no spouse or partner present. About 28.6% of all households were made up of individuals and 14.7% had someone living alone who was 65 years of age or older.

There were 3,919 housing units, of which 15.6% were vacant. The homeowner vacancy rate was 1.7% and the rental vacancy rate was 16.1%.

Racial composition as of the 2020 census
Race	Number	Percent
White	5,333	61.5%
Black or African American	345	4.0%
American Indian and Alaska Native	76	0.9%
Asian	50	0.6%
Native Hawaiian and Other Pacific Islander	0	0.0%
Some other race	1,109	12.8%
Two or more races	1,761	20.3%

=== 2000 Census ===
As of the census of 2000, 9,952 people, 3,696 households, and 2,679 families resided in the city. The population density was 2,080.8 inhabitants per square mile (803.4/km^{2}). The 4,270 housing units averaged 892.8 per square mile (344.9/km^{2}). The racial makeup of the city was 41.9% White non-Hispanic, 4.2% African American, 0.7% Native American, 0.19% Asian, 19.51% from other races, and 2.13% from two or more races. Hispanics or Latinos of any race were 52.96% of the population.

Of the 3,696 households, 34.4% had children under 18 living with them, 56.5% were married couples living together, 12.2% had a female householder with no husband present, and 27.5% were not families. About 25.5% of all households were made up of individuals, and 14.6% had someone living alone who was 65 or older. The average household size was 2.66 and the average family size was 3.20.

In the city, the population was distributed as 29.7% under 18, 8.0% from 18 to 24, 24.4% from 25 to 44, 20.4% from 45 to 64, and 17.4% who were 65 or older. The median age was 36 years. For every 100 females, there were 90.1 males. For every 100 females 18 and over, there were 83.3 males.

The median income for a household in the city was $27,362, and for a family was $31,556. Males had a median income of $26,393 versus $16,826 for females. The per capita income for the city was $16,211. About 18.1% of families and 21.9% of the population were below the poverty line, including 33.4% of those under 18 and 12.9% of those 65 or over.

== Arts and culture ==
During the last weekend of April, Lamesa hosts the annual Chicken Fried Steak Festival. Lamesa has been called "the birthplace of the chicken-fried steak", but the reporter who made the designation later confessed that the claim is fictional. Nevertheless, in 2011, Governor Rick Perry declared Lamesa the home of the chicken-fried steak. In the 2013 competition, Mayor Dave Nix teamed with city councilman Greg Hughes as contestants. The community event attracted 65 sponsors and 104 booths.

La Entrada al Pacifico is an international trade corridor that begins in Topolobampo, Mexico, runs through Midland-Odessa, and ends in Lamesa (according to the legal definition).

Lamesa's Sky-Vue Drive-In Theater, established in 1948, became a well-known regional fixture. It has been closed since a kitchen fire destroyed the snack bar on November 27, 2015. Known for its "Chihuahua sandwich", conceived by owners R. A. "Skeet" Noret and his wife, Sarah, the Sky-Vue was one of only 14 remaining drive-in theaters in Texas. Others are in Lubbock and Clarendon. Before he became famous, musician Buddy Holly performed on the roof of the Sky Vue's projector building. The theater was also used as cover art and named in the title of country music album Down at the Sky-Vue Drive-In by country music artist Don Walser. Lamesa also has an indoor movie theater, Movieland, which has two screens.

"The Wall" on S 2nd Street is a brick wall on which graduating seniors of Lamesa High School paint their names. Each year, the new graduating class adds their own graffiti on top of the last.

=== Dal Paso Museum ===
The Dal Paso Museum, a collection of local artifacts housed in a former hotel, is located in downtown Lamesa. The name is derived from the fact that Lamesa is located on the table land of the Staked Plains. On display are home furnishings, pioneer tools, ranch and farm equipment, and exhibits by local artists. The museum, at 306 South First Street, has limited afternoon hours to the public.

== Education ==
Lamesa is served by the Lamesa Independent School District, which includes Lamesa High School and Lamesa Middle School.

A branch of Howard College, a community college in Big Spring, is located in Lamesa.

== Media ==
The city is served by a biweekly newspaper, The Lamesa Press Reporter. Local radio station KPET (AM 690) broadcasts local news, call-in shows, and country music, in addition to sporting events from the hometown Golden Tornadoes, the Red Raiders, and the Texas Rangers. Other radio stations include KBKN (FM) and KVLM (FM). The cable TV system is operated by Northland Cable Television. Other signals are received from stations in Lubbock, Midland-Odessa, and other area towns. Television signals are provided by ABC, CBS, NBC, PBS, Fox, Telemundo, and CW stations in Lubbock and the Univision station in the Permian Basin (Midland-Odessa).

== Infrastructure ==
U.S. Highway 87 (Lynn Avenue) passes through the eastern side of the city, leading north 61 miles (98 km) to Lubbock and southeast 44 miles (71 km) to Big Spring. U.S. Highway 180 passes through the center of town as 4th Street and leads west 41 miles (66 km) to Seminole and east 62 miles (100 km) to Snyder. Texas State Highway 137 passes through the city as Bryan Avenue and leads northwest 38 miles (61 km) to Brownfield and south 45 miles (72 km) to Stanton. Texas State Highway 349 branches off Highway 137 south of Lamesa and leads southwest 55 miles (89 km) to Midland.

== Notable people ==
- Barry Corbin, actor
- Steve Freeman, former Buffalo Bills defensive back and NFL referee
- V. O. Key, Jr., political scientist
- Lynn Morris, bluegrass musician
- Steve Pearce, former U.S. representative from New Mexico
- Bo Robinson, NFL player
- Jerry Taff, journalist
- Don Walser, Country musician

== In popular culture ==
The CBS television series Dallas had one of its more profitable oil wells, Ewing 23, in Lamesa. In one of the more dramatic scenes of the series, in season four, J. R. Ewing flies in his Learjet to the Lamesa airport. Shortly thereafter, gunfire erupts and Dawson County sheriff's deputies shoot a man who blew up the oilfield after a failed effort to blackmail Ewing.

Stephen Graham Jones' Bram Stoker Award winning novel I Was a Teenager Slasher is based in Lamesa. The main characters Tolly Driver and Amber Dennison are both juniors at Lamesa High School during the events of the novel.

== Photo gallery ==
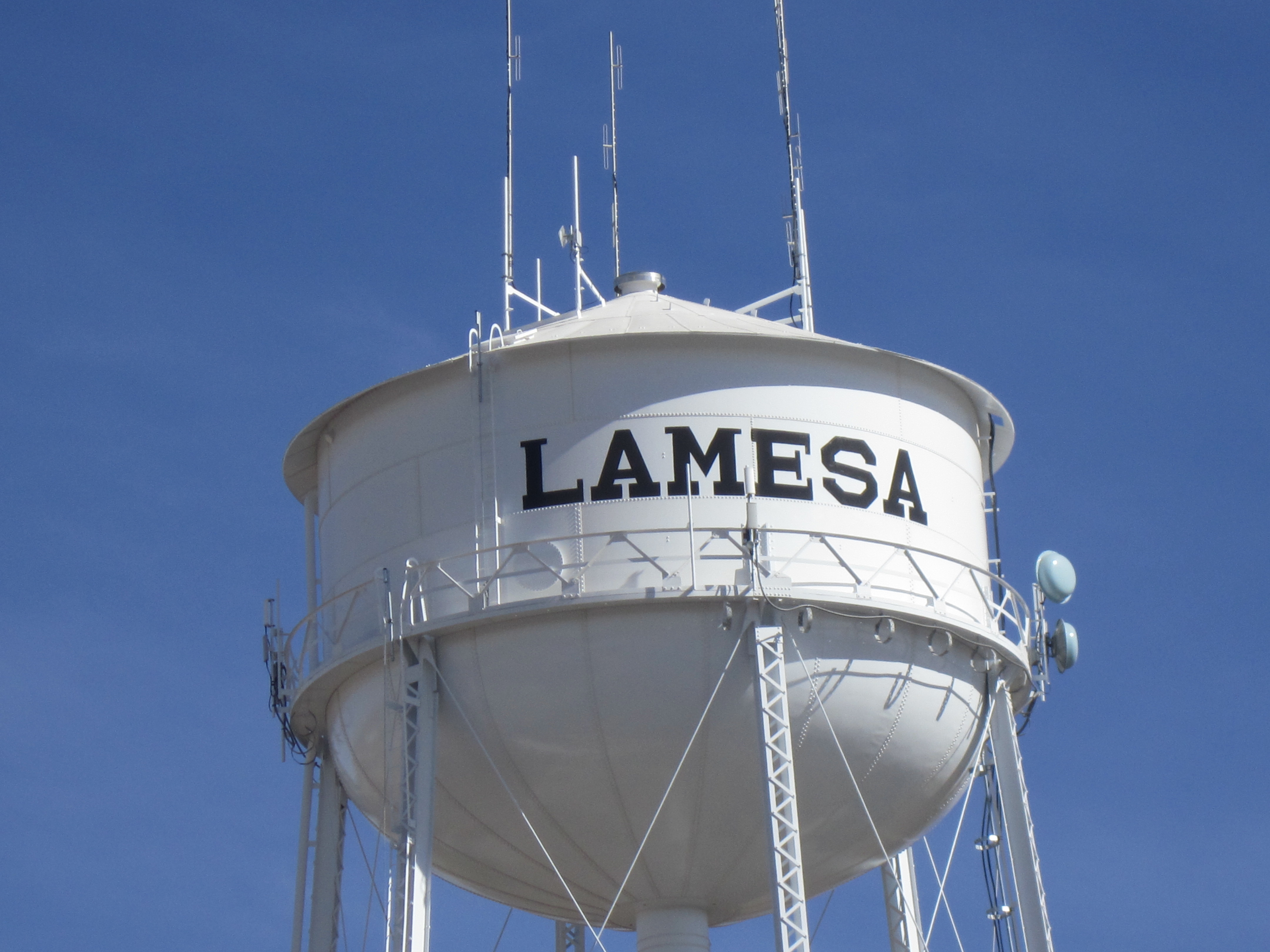
Lamesa water tower

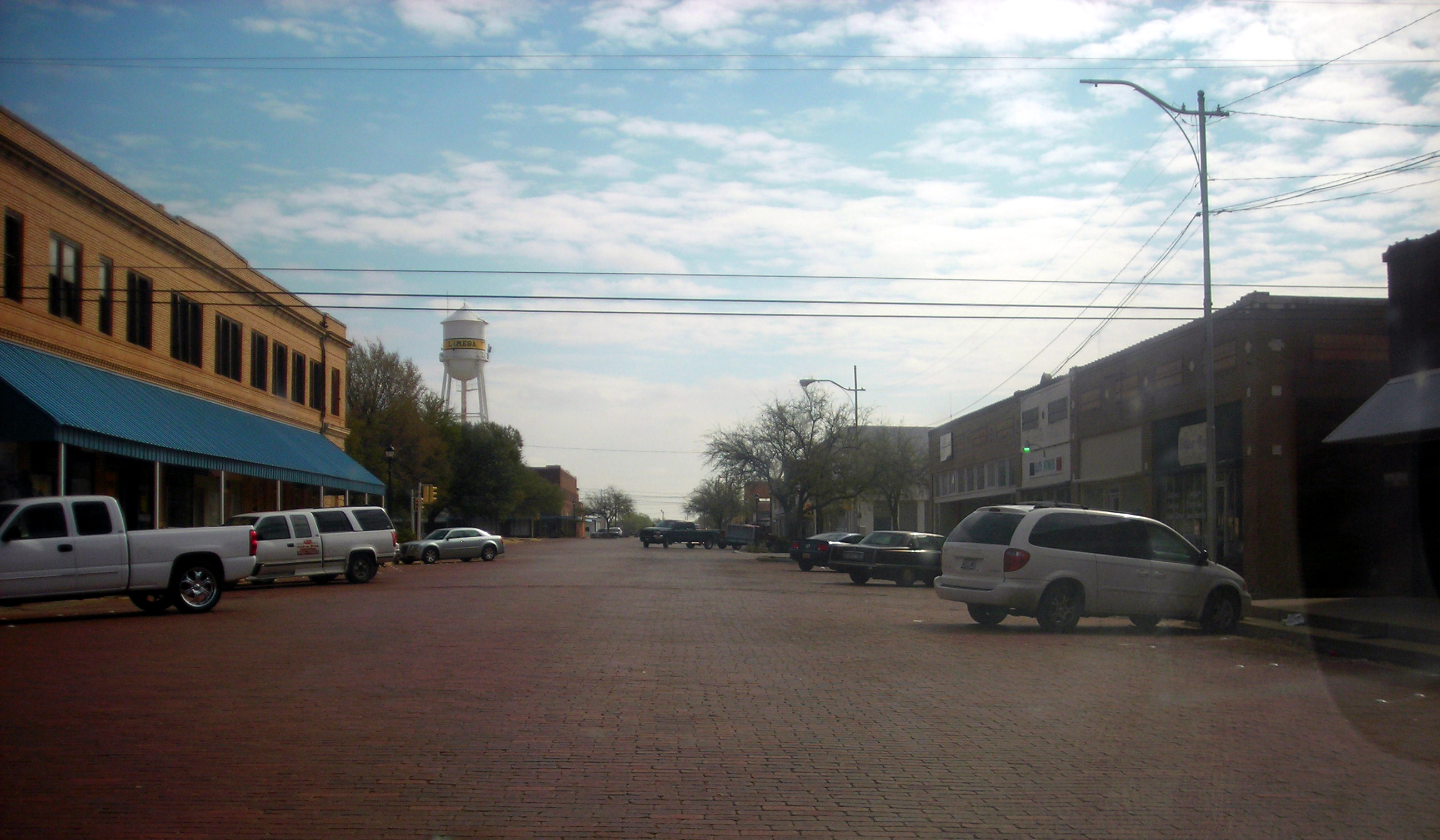
A view of downtown Lamesa

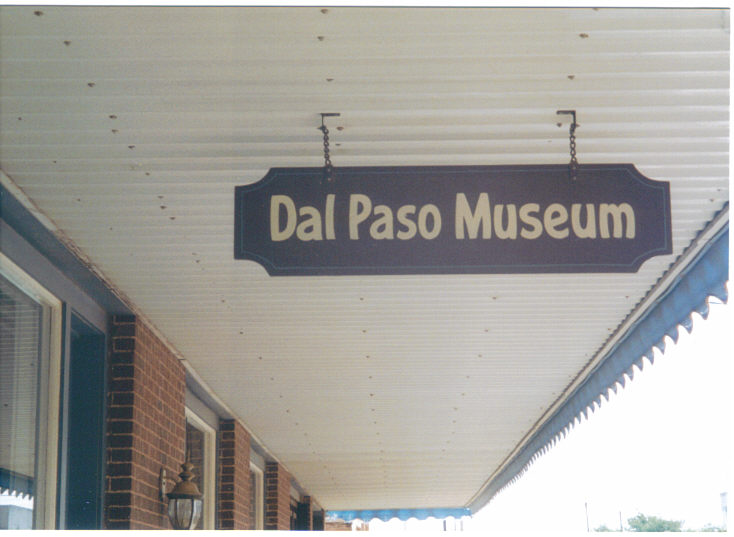
Entrance to Dal Paseo Museum in Lamesa, located in a former hotel

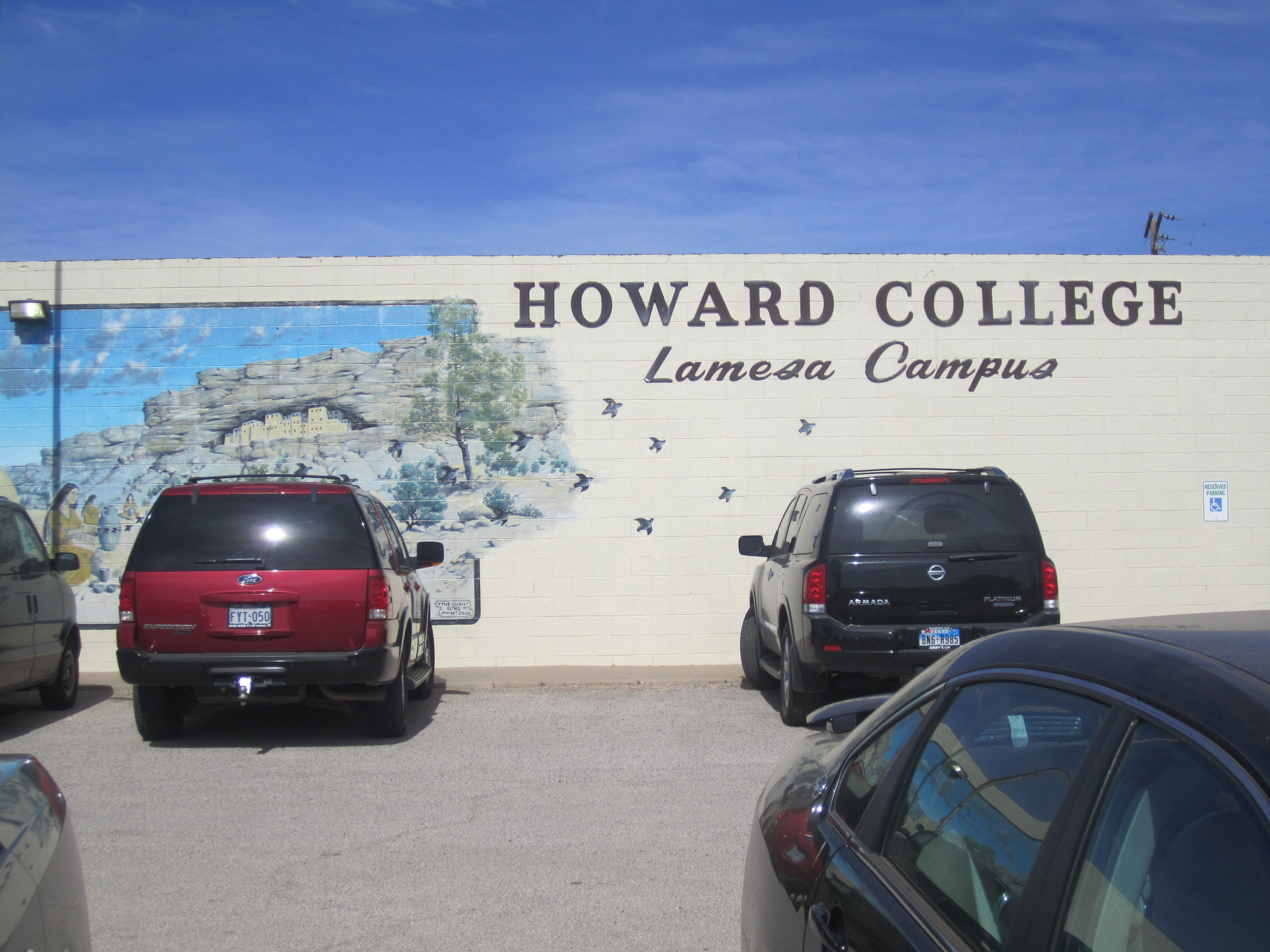
Lamesa campus of Howard College, a community college based in Big Spring

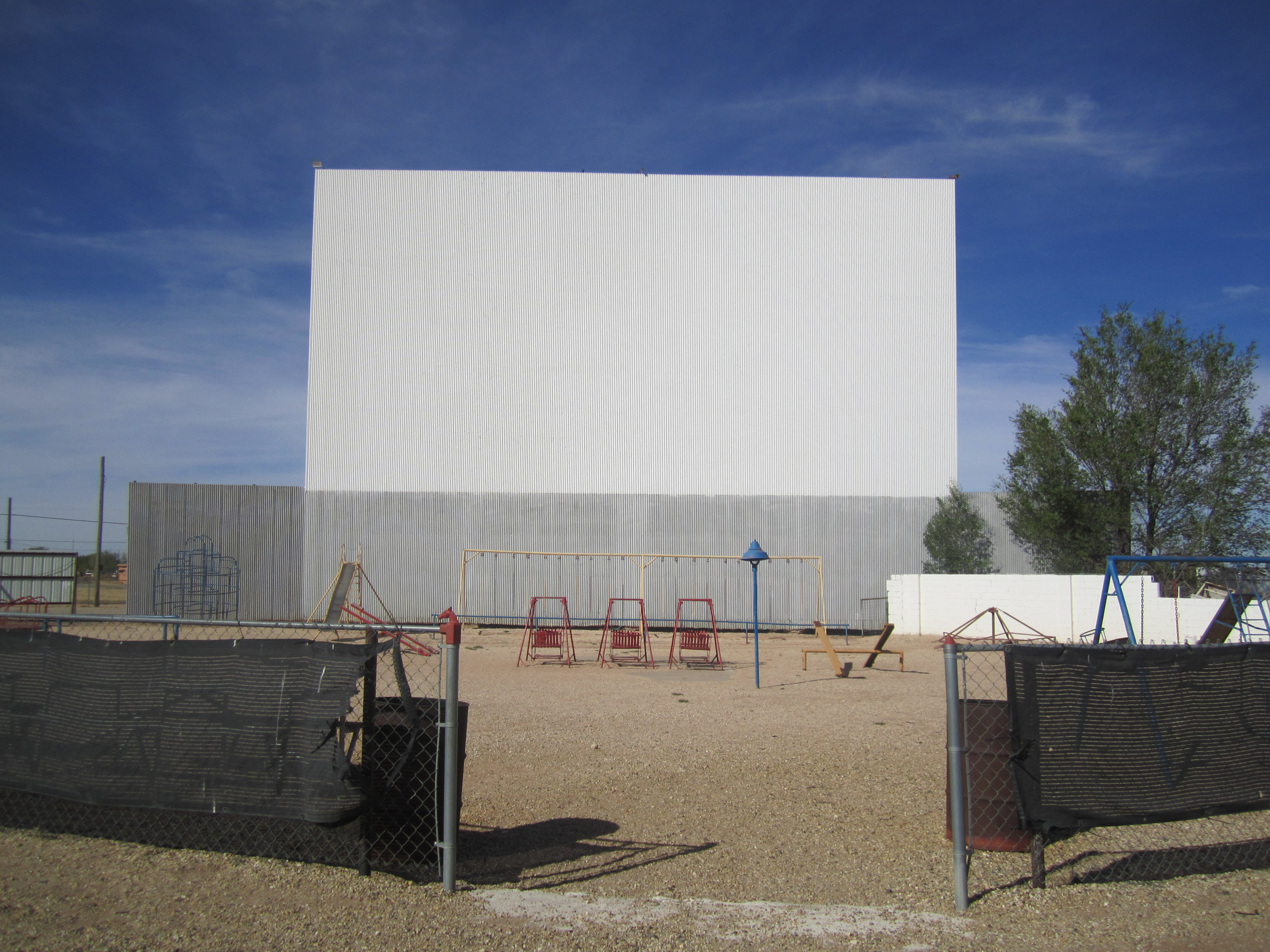
The Sky-Vue Drive-in Theater in Lamesa operated from 1948 until its concession stand burned in November 2015 and the facility closed for further business.

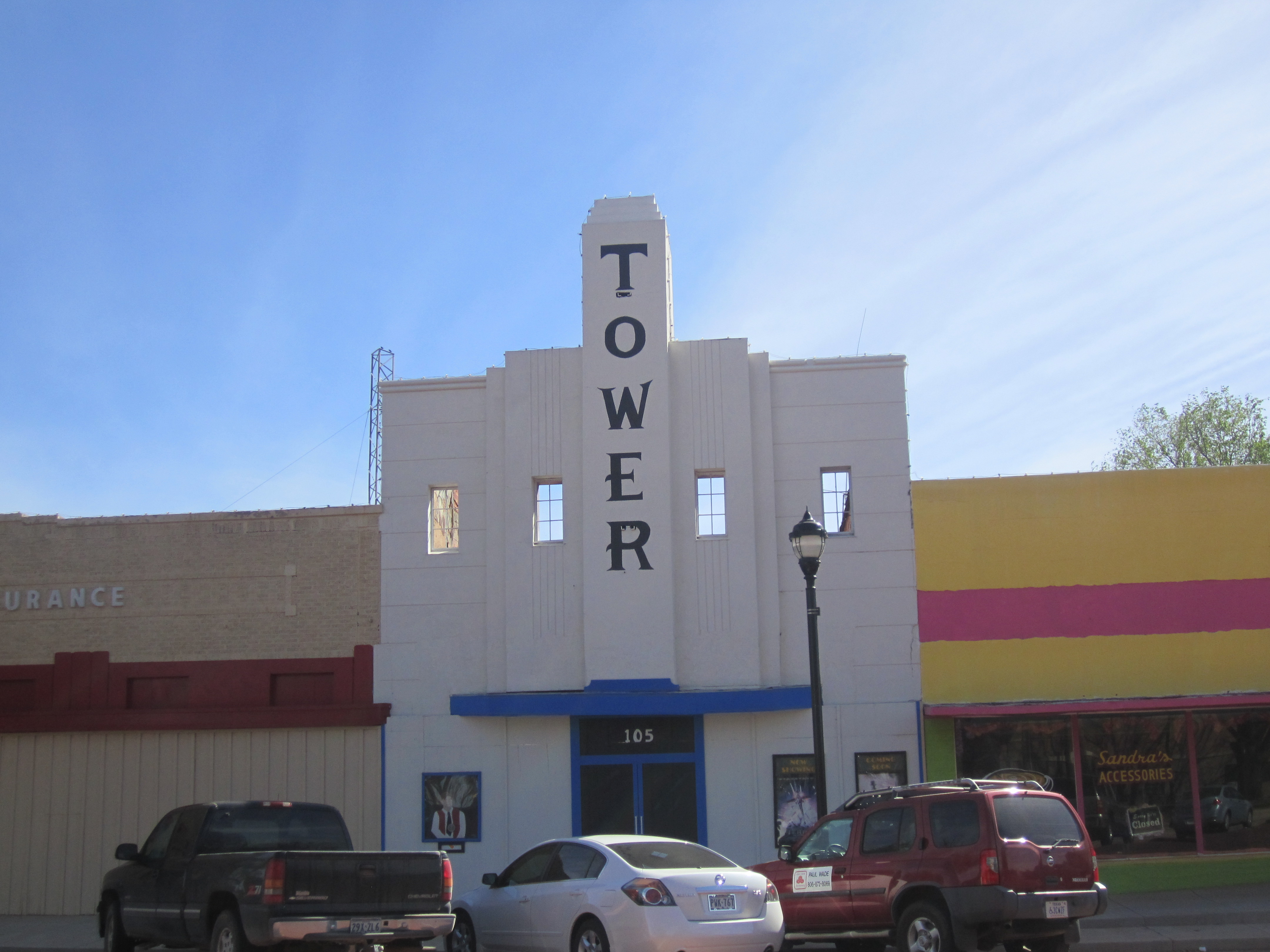
No longer in use, the Tower Theater is located in downtown Lamesa across from the Dawson County Courthouse.

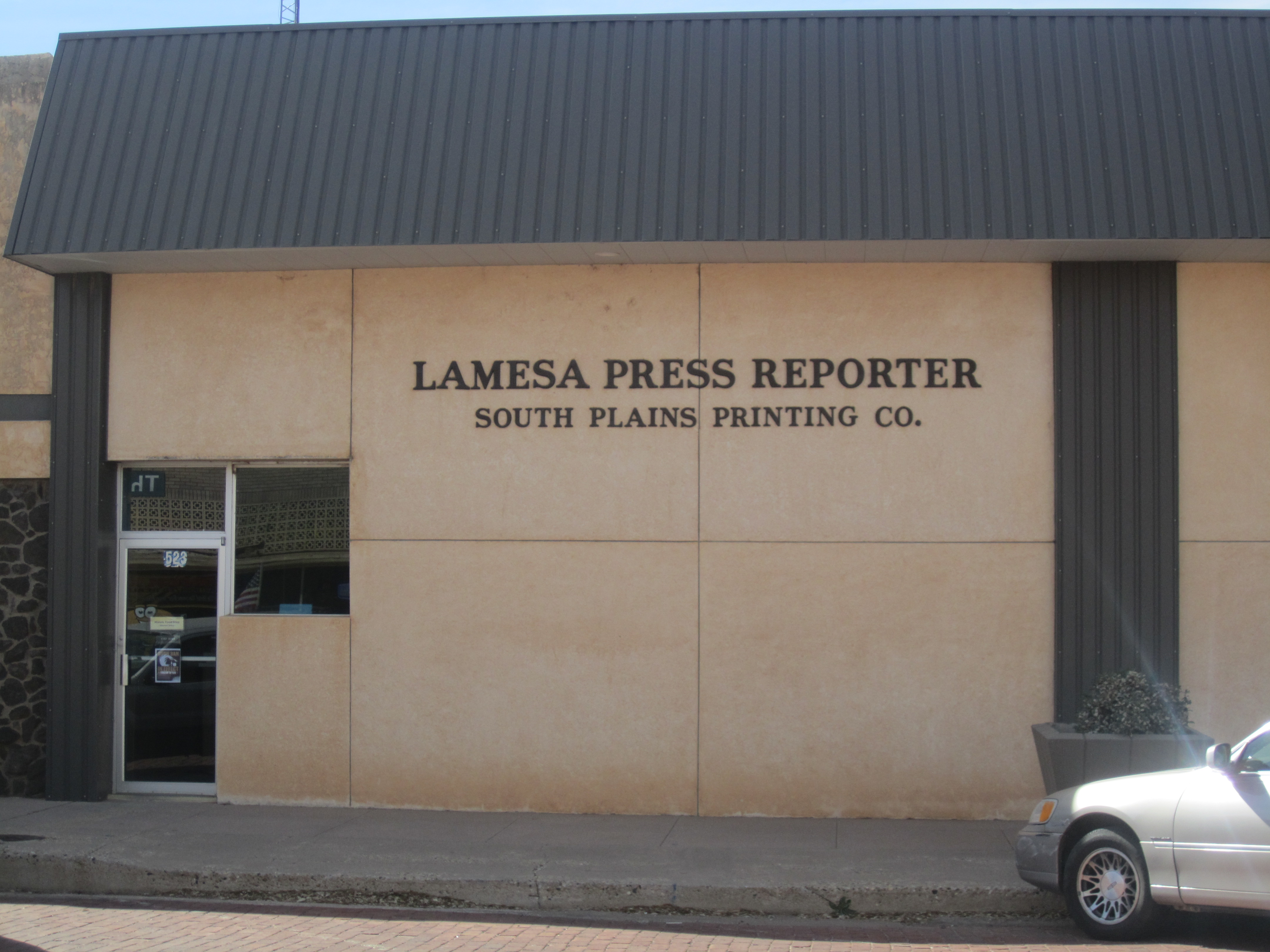
Lamesa Press Reporter newspaper office

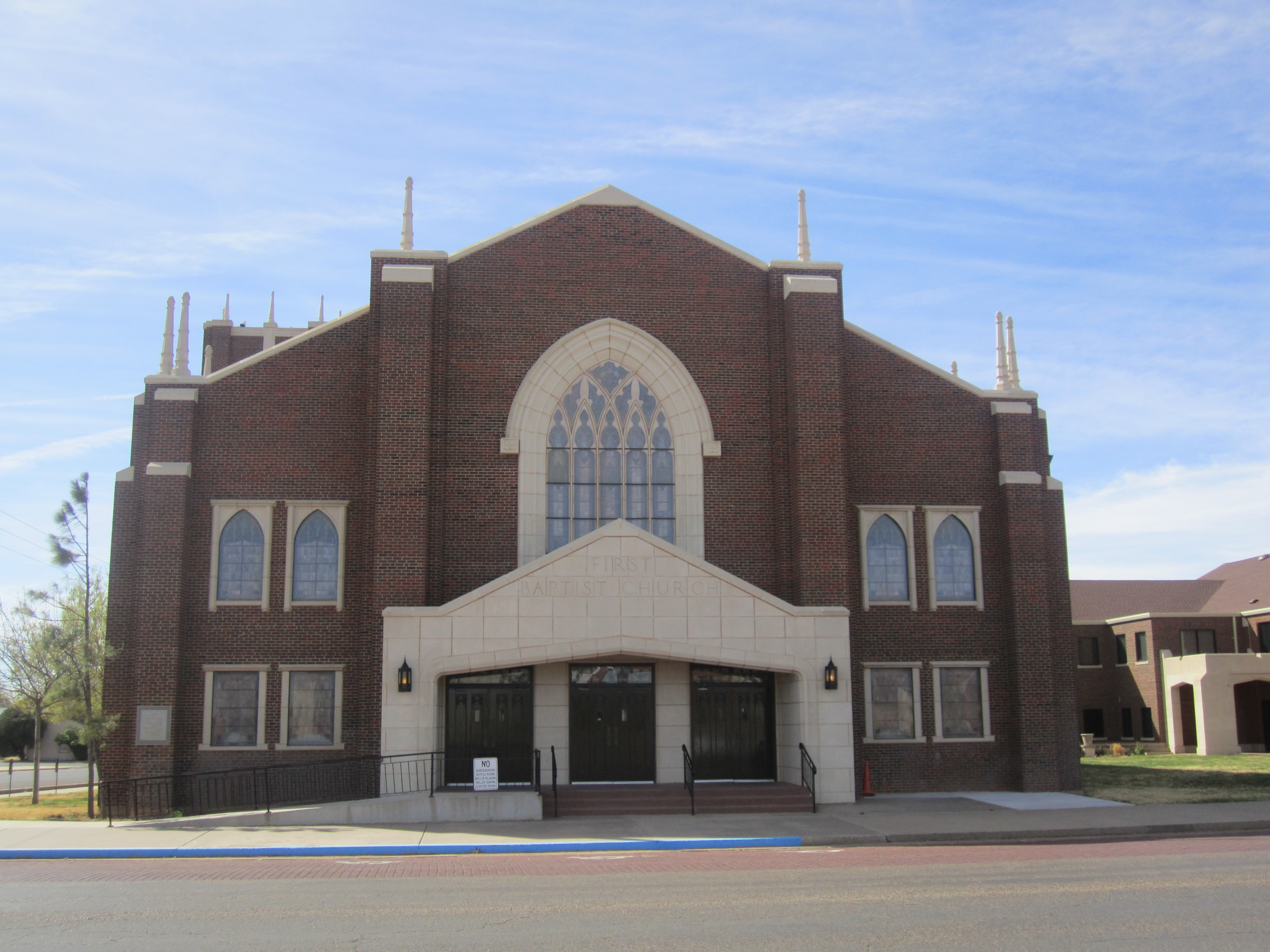
First Baptist Church of Lamesa at 801 S 1st St.

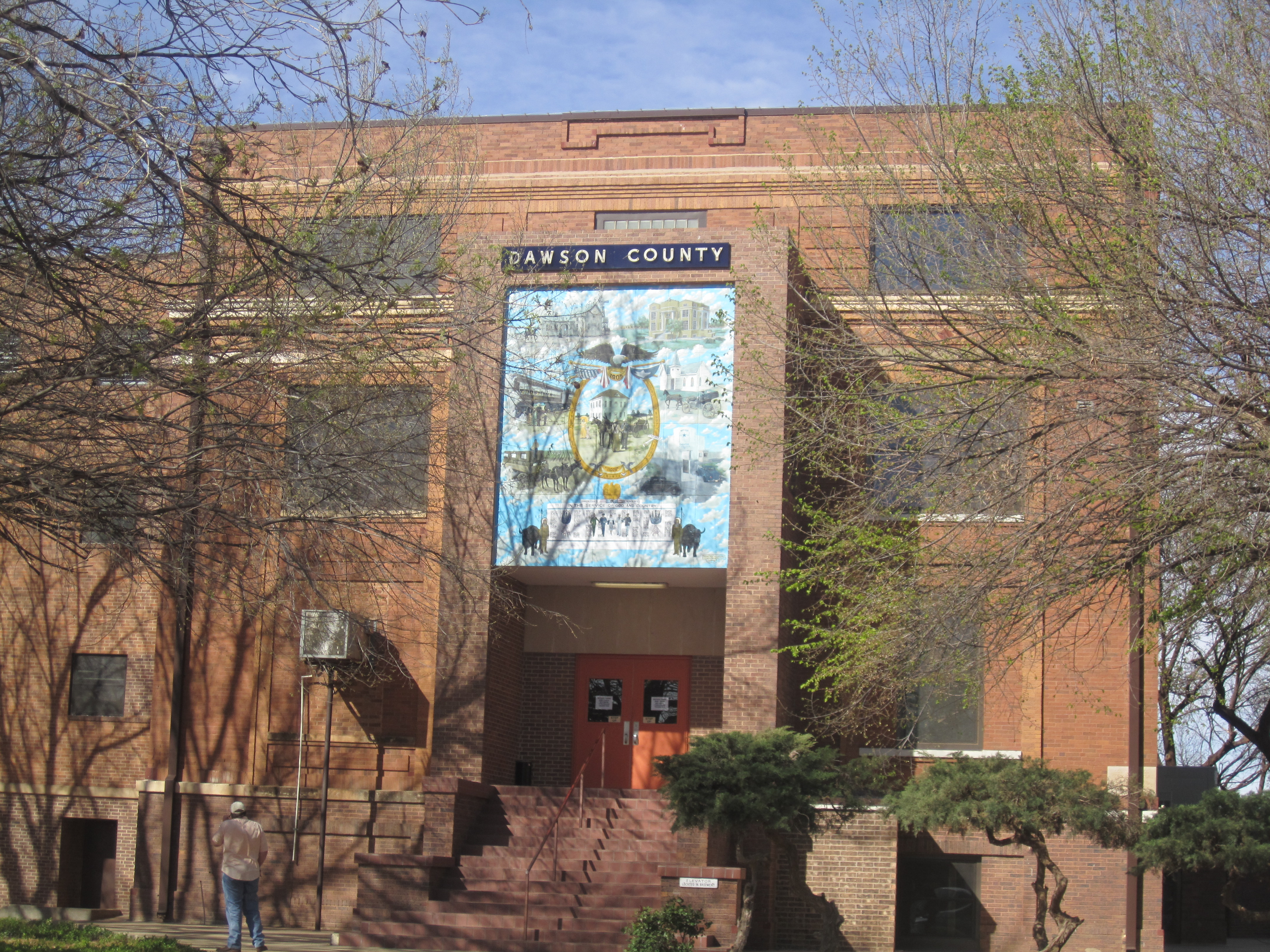
Dawson County Courthouse in downtown Lamesa
