= March 1918 =

Month in 1918

<<	March 1918					>>
Su	Mo	Tu	We	Th	Fr	Sa
					1	2
3	4	5	6	7	8	9
10	11	12	13	14	15	16
17	18	19	20	21	22	23
24	25	26	27	28	29	30
31

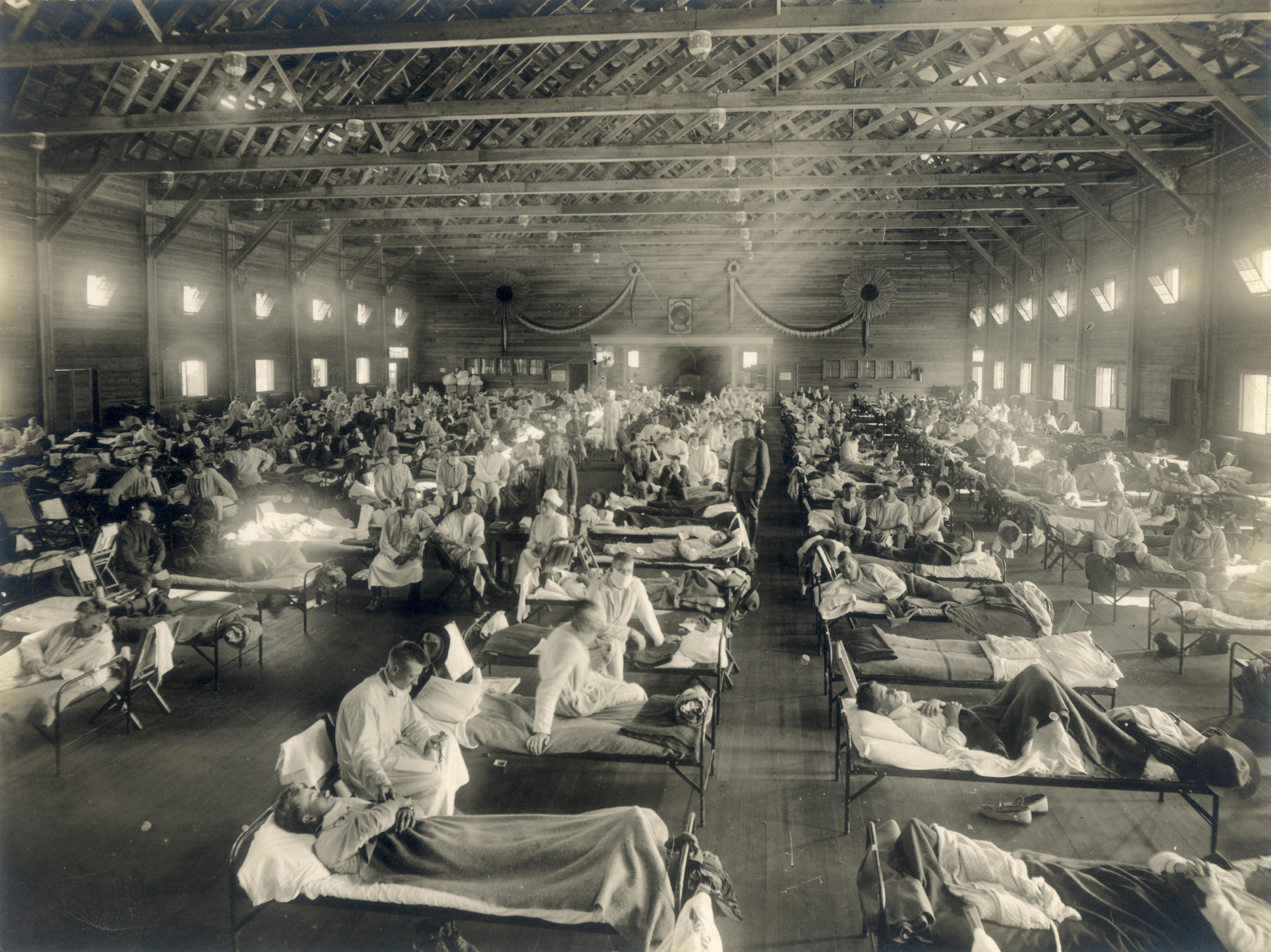
Soldiers from Fort Riley, Kansas, ill with Spanish flu at a hospital ward at Camp Funston.

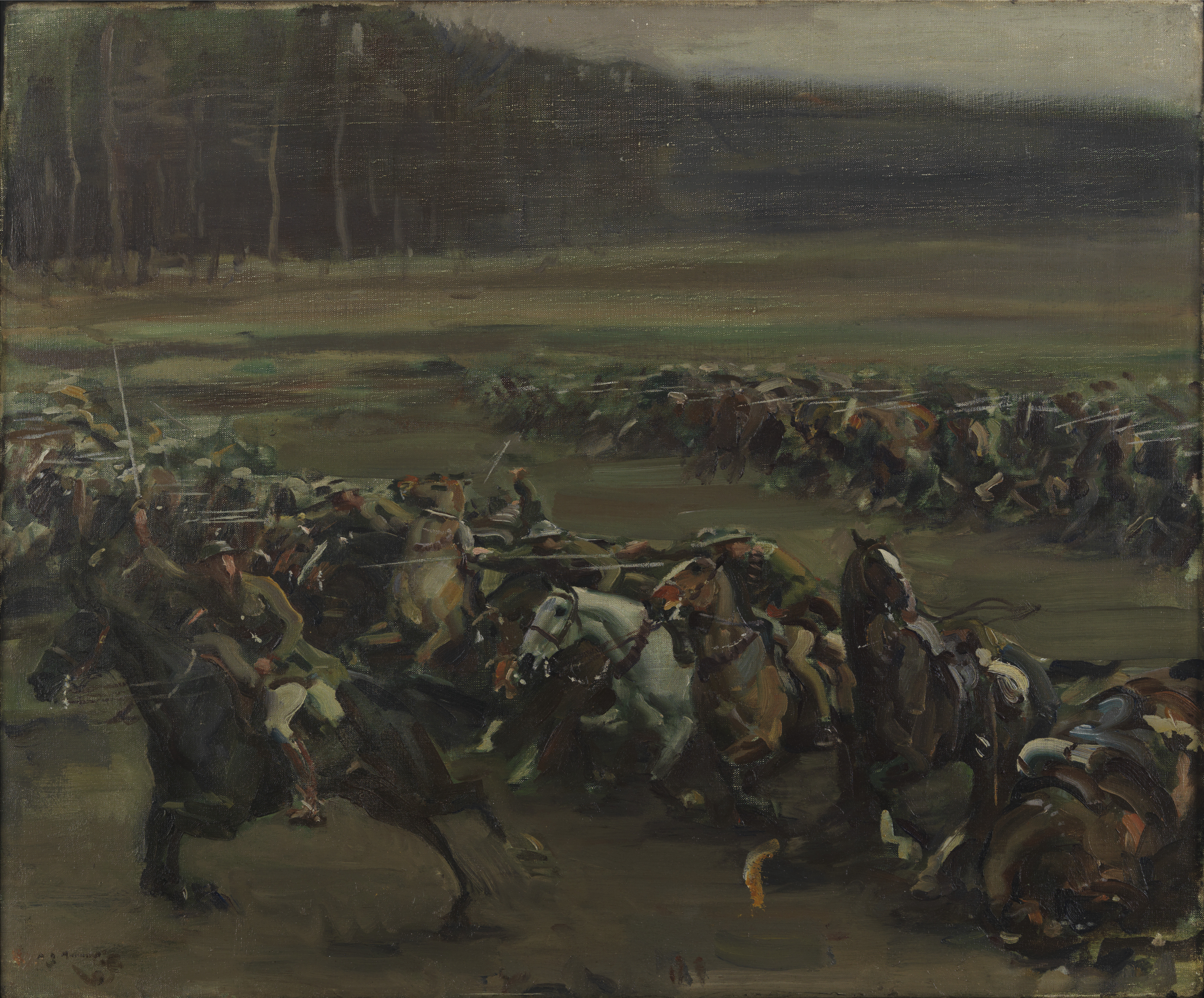
Painting by Alfred Munnings of the Allied cavalry attack against the Germans during Battle of Moreuil Wood.

The following events occurred in March 1918:

== March 1, 1918 (Friday) ==
- Soviet–Ukrainian War – Ukrainian military commander Symon Petliura, with support from the Central Powers, pushed Russian Soviet forces out of Kiev.
- Former president Rodrigues Alves received nearly the entire electoral vote - 99.1% - during the general election in Brazil.
- Royal Navy armed merchant cruiser HMS Calgarian was sunk by German submarine U-19 off the coast of Ireland with the loss of 49 lives.
- German submarine SM UB-54 went missing after departing for patrol in the English Channel. It was believed it had struck a mine and sank with all 29 crew.
- The Royal Flying Corps established air squadrons No. 130, No. 131, No. 132, No. 133, No. 134, No. 135, and No. 143.
- Air force base March Field was established in Riverside County, California.
- The Uruguayan Athletics Federation, later renamed the Uruguayan Athletics Confederation, was established as the official governing body of all sports in Uruguay.
- The fraternity Phi Mu Delta was established at the University of Connecticut.
- Veiveriai Teachers' Seminary graduated its last class before closing in Veiveriai, Congress Poland (now part of Lithuania).
- Born:
  - Roger Delgado, British actor, best known for the role of The Master in Doctor Who; full name Roger Caesar Marius Bernard de Delgado Torres Castillo Roberto, in London, England (d. 1973)
  - Duncan White, Ceylonese runner, silver medalist in the 1948 Summer Olympics, first athlete from Ceylon to win an Olympic medal; in Kalutara, British Ceylon (present-day Sri Lanka) (d. 1998)
- Died:
  - Harlan Carey Brewster, 47, Canadian politician, 18th Premier of British Columbia (b. 1870)
  - Charles Mackarness, English clergy, Archdeacon of the East Riding for the Church of England from 1898 to 1916 (b. 1850)
  - Jacob H. Smith, 67, American army officer, controversial commander of American forces during the Philippine–American War (b. 1840)

== March 2, 1918 (Saturday) ==
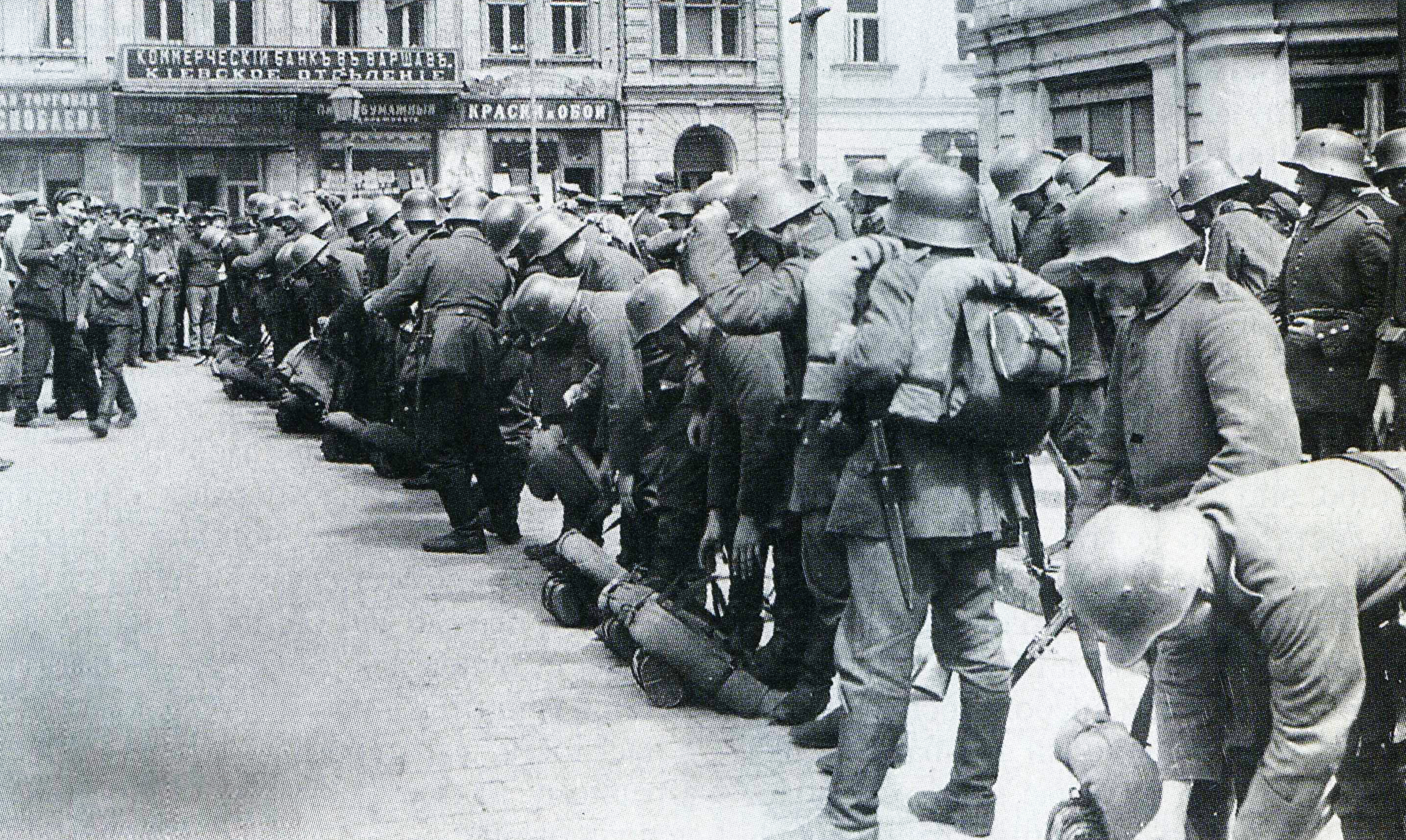
German troops in Kiev, March 1918.

- Operation Faustschlag – The Central Powers captured Kiev during the "Operation Fist Punch".
- Royal Navy submarine HMS H5 was mistaken for a German U-boat and rammed by another British ship, killing all 26 crew.
- The Australian Army established the 1st, 2nd, 3rd, 4th, and 5th Machine Gun Battalions to support the 1st, 2nd, 3rd, 4th, and 5th Australian Divisions respectively.
- Irish revolutionary leader Ernest Blythe was arrested in Skibbereen, County Cork, Ireland for non-compliance with a military rule directing him to reside in Ulster.
- Died: Prince Mirko, 38, Montenegrin noble, son of Nicholas I of Montenegro (b. 1879)

== March 3, 1918 (Sunday) ==
- The Central Powers and Russia signed the Treaty of Brest-Litovsk, ending Operation Faustschlag and Russia's involvement in World War I.
- Hipólito Yrigoyen retained his seat as President of Argentina after his party, the Radical Civic Union, won majority of the seats in the Chamber of Deputies during the legislative election in Argentina (where voter turnout was 54 percent).
- The Royal Flying Corps established air squadron No. 149.
- Kaiser Wilhelm established the Wound Badge for all soldiers of the Imperial German Army who were wounded during military service.
- Born:
  - Arthur Kornberg, American biochemist, recipient of the Nobel Prize in Physiology or Medicine for his research into DNA; in New York City, United States (d. 2007)
  - Peter O'Sullevan, Irish radio broadcaster, leading horse race commentator for BBC during the Grand National race series; in Newcastle, County Down, Ireland (d. 2015)
  - Fritz Thiedemann, German equestrian, gold medalist at the 1956 and 1960 Summer Olympics, two-time bronze medalist at the 1952 Summer Olympics; in Weddinghusen, German Empire (present-day Germany) (d. 2000)
  - San Yu, Burmese state leader, 5th President of Burma; in Prome, British India (present-day Pyay, Myanmar) (d. 1996)

== March 4, 1918 (Monday) ==
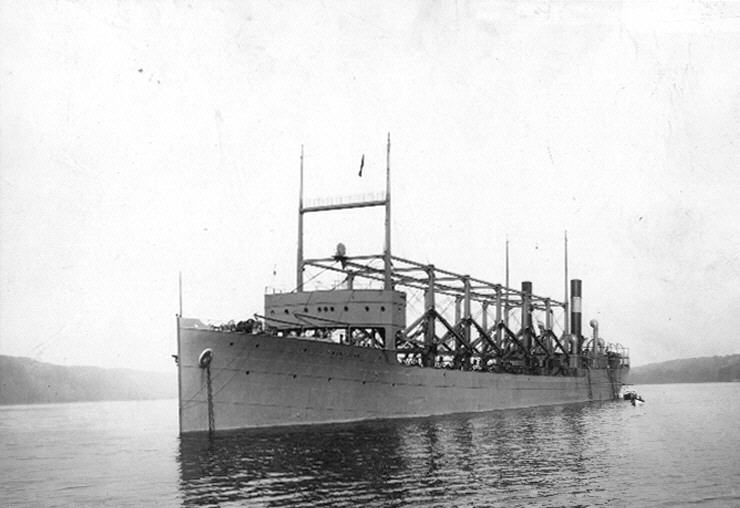
USS Cyclops, disappeared after leaving Barbados.

- American collier ship USS Cyclops disappeared with all 306 crew and passengers on-board after departing from Barbados for Baltimore following an unscheduled stop for repairs. The cargo ship went missing in the Bermuda Triangle, a sea region notorious for unexplained disappearances, although the United States Navy speculated the ship may have had experienced structural failure and foundered en route. Along with her cargo of 10,800 long tons (10,973 t) of manganese ore that would have been used to manufacture munitions, the ship was the single biggest non-combative loss of life and cargo in American naval history.
- The Airco Amiens bomber was first flown.
- Born:
  - Margaret Osborne duPont, American tennis player, number one world tennis champion in 1947, record-holder of 25 Grand Slam titles at the US Open; as Margaret Evelyn Osborne, in Joseph, Oregon, United States (d. 2012)
  - Alfred Judson Force Moody, American army officer, member of the Supreme Headquarters Allied Expeditionary Force during World War II, three-time recipient of the Legion of Merit, Distinguished Service Medal, Bronze Star Medal, and seven Air Medals; in New Haven, Connecticut, United States (d. 1967)

== March 5, 1918 (Tuesday) ==
- Nearly the entire Baltic Fleet of the Imperial Russian Navy arrived safely in Helsinki following their strategic retreat from Tallinn, Estonia.
- Invasion of Åland – A German naval unit landed on the Åland Islands in the Baltic Sea in an attempt to secure strategic naval staging areas for Operation Faustschlag ("Operation Fist Punch") before islands fell under Swedish control. The unit captured 1,200 Russian troops while Sweden interned another 250 Ukrainian, Russian and Estonian soldiers on the islands it controlled.
- Born: James Tobin, American economist, recipient of the Nobel Memorial Prize in Economic Sciences for his contributions to Keynesian economics; in Champaign, Illinois, United States (d. 2002)

== March 6, 1918 (Wednesday) ==
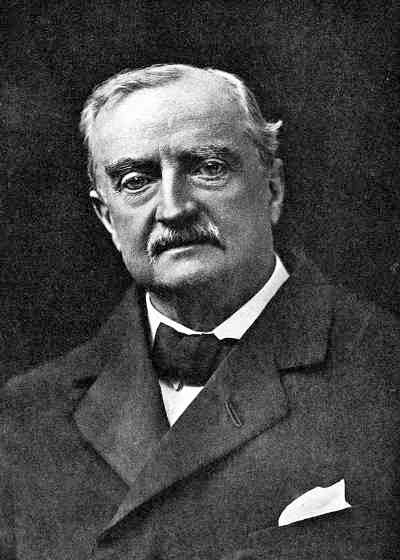
John Redmond

- The House of Commons of the United Kingdom paid tributes to Irish Nationalist leader John Redmond, who died in London from heart failure. Redmond had summoned a Jesuit priest before he died, saying "Father, I am a broken-hearted man." John Dillon succeeded him as leader of the Irish Parliamentary Party.
- John Oliver became the 19th Premier of British Columbia following the death of Harlan Carey Brewster.
- The Finnish Army Corps of Aviation was established as a forerunner to the Finnish Air Force, with the first plane donated by Swedish explorer and aviator Eric von Rosen.
- The first pilotless drone, the Hewitt-Sperry Automatic Airplane, was developed and test-flown by aviation engineers Elmer Ambrose Sperry and Peter Cooper Hewitt, in Long Island, New York. However, the model was scrapped in 1925 after its guidance system proved unreliable.

== March 7, 1918 (Thursday) ==
- Finland formed an alliance with Germany, based on its support of the White Guards during the Finnish Civil War.
- Five German Riesenflugzeug bombers raided England, with one of them dropping a 1,000-kg (2,205-lb) bomb on Warrington Crescent near London Paddington station. Lena Guilbert Ford, lyricist of the popular wartime song "Keep the Home Fires Burning", and her 30-year-old son Walter were killed in the bombing, becoming the first U.S. citizens to be killed in a German bombing raid.
- The Argentine women's magazine Atlántida had a successful debut with a circulation of 45,000.
- The Vanderbilt Theatre, designed by architect Eugene De Rosa, opened at 148 West 48th Street in Manhattan, New York City.
- Died: Clopton Lloyd-Jones, 59, English football player and cricketer, member of the Clapham Rovers and 1880 FA Cup champion (b. 1858)

== March 8, 1918 (Friday) ==
A United States Marshals wanted poster for Tom Sisson and the Power brothers following a shootout in Arizona.

- Battle of Tell 'Asur – The Egyptian Expeditionary Force crossed the Judaean Mountains at night to the edge of the Jordan Valley in Palestine as it started to push north against the front line defenses of the Ottoman Seventh and Eighth Armies.
- Battle of Bakhmach – The Czechoslovak Legion clashed with German forces at Bakhmach, Ukraine in one of the last major battles on the Eastern Front.
- The 7th Congress of the Russian Social Democratic Labor Party officially changed the name of the political party to the Russian Communist Party.
- The United States Cavalry caught three fugitives from a shootout at a mining cabin in the Galiuro Mountains of Arizona on February 10, ending the largest manhunt in the state's history. All three received life sentences for the shooting deaths of three lawmen but two of the surviving fugitives were released and pardoned in 1960.
- The first Yiddish communist newspaper The Truth was published in Petrograd. It was closed down soon after and restarted as Der Emes.
- Born:
  - Mendel L. Peterson, American archaeologist, pioneer in underwater archaeology; in Moore, Idaho, United States (d. 2003)
  - Poon Lim, Chinese sailor, survived 133 days adrift in the Atlantic Ocean from 1942 to 1943 following the sinking of SS Benlomond by a German U-boat, recipient of the British Empire Medal; in Hainan, Republic of China (present-day China) (d. 1991)
- Died: Otto von Diederichs, 74, German naval officer, commander of the East Asia Squadron and Chief of the German Imperial Admiralty Staff from 1898 to 1902 (b. 1843)

== March 9, 1918 (Saturday) ==
- Battle of Tell 'Asur – The British 158th Infantry Brigade captured Tell 'Asur, a key hill that served as an observation post for the lower half of the Jordan Valley towards Galilee.
- Wageningen University was established in the Netherlands.
- Born:
  - Mickey Spillane, American crime writer, creator of the private eye Mike Hammer; as Frank Morrison Spillane, in New York City, United States (d. 2006)
  - George Lincoln Rockwell, American fringe politician, founder of the American Nazi Party; in Bloomington, Illinois, United States (d. 1967, murdered)
- Died:
  - Frank Wedekind, 53, German playwright, best known for the plays Spring Awakening, Earth Spirit and Pandora's Box (b. 1864)
  - George von Lengerke Meyer, 59, American public servant, 43rd United States Postmaster General and 40th United States Secretary of the Navy (b. 1858)

== March 10, 1918 (Sunday) ==
- A cyclone struck Innisfail, Queensland, Australia, delivering winds exceeding 100 km/h and destroying all but a dozen houses in the town. The storm killed 37 people in the town itself and another 40 to 60 people in the surrounding countryside.
- Battle of Bakhmach – Fighting between the Czechoslovak Legion and the Germans climaxed with intense hand-to-hand fighting for control of the bridge over the Desna River.
- Invasion of Åland – The Finnish Red Guards opened negotiations with Germany over the Åland Islands as the presence of the Imperial German Navy in the islands made the Red Guards capital of Turku, Finland vulnerable to attack.
- The Spanish Liberal coalition won 42% of the vote in the general election, allowing Antonio Maura to resume a third term as Prime Minister of Spain.
- German submarine SM UB-58 struck a mine and sank in the English Channel with the loss of all 35 crew.
- German flying ace Hans-Joachim Buddecke, the third pilot to receive the Pour le Mérite (Blue Max) after fellow pilots Max Immelmann and Oswald Boelcke, was shot down and killed during an aerial battle over Lens, Pas-de-Calais, France.
- The British Army established the 56th Indian Brigade to serve in the Mesopotamian campaign.
- The Warner Brothers released their first film feature, the propaganda drama My Four Years in Germany, in New York City before going into wide release in April. The film was based on the memoirs of American diplomat James W. Gerard.
- Born:
  - Günther Rall, German air force officer, commander of Jagdgeschwader 52 and Jagdgeschwader 11 for the Luftwaffe during World War II, third highest-ranking German fighter ace with 275 victories, recipient of the Knight's Cross of the Iron Cross; in Gaggenau, German Empire (present-day Germany) (d. 2009)
  - Víctor Manuel Blanco, Puerto Rican astronomer, second director of the Cerro Tololo Inter-American Observatory in Chile; as Víctor Manuel Blanco Pagán, in Guayama, Puerto Rico (d. 2011)
- Died:
  - Jim McCormick, 61, Scottish-American baseball player, pitcher for many National League teams including the Cleveland Blues (b. 1856)
  - Ernest Wild, 38, British explorer, member of the Ross Sea party of the Imperial Trans-Antarctic Expedition, recipient of the Albert Medal for Lifesaving, brother to explorer Frank Wild (b. 1879)

== March 11, 1918 (Monday) ==
- 1918 flu pandemic – U.S. Army mess cook Private Albert Gitchell of Fort Riley, Kansas became the first documented case of Spanish flu. However, cases of the flu were observed as early as January in Haskell County, Kansas.
- A general election was held in Liechtenstein with a second round of voting held March 18.
- German submarine SM UB-17 disappeared after departing from Zeebrugge, Belgium with all 18 crew missing. Her wreck was discovered in 2013 off the coast of Suffolk, England.
- British Foreign Office Under-Secretary Charles Hardinge established the Political Intelligence Department, with William Tyrrell as director.
- The first two wings of the Newman College in Melbourne, designed by American architect Walter Burley Griffin, opened for classes.
- The Indian Iron and Steel Company was established to own and operate the former Bengal Iron & Steel Co. iron works plant in Burnpur, India.
- The silent film comedy Amarilly of Clothes-Line Alley, starring Mary Pickford and directed by Marshall Neilan, premiered as an adaptation of the novel by Belle K. Maniates by screenwriter Frances Marion.
- The play Friendly Enemies by Aaron Hoffman premiered at the Woods Theatre in Chicago.

== March 12, 1918 (Tuesday) ==
- Moscow became the new capital of Soviet Russia due to the security risk of Petrograd being too close to territory seized by the Central Powers during "Operation Fist Punch".
- Battle of Tell 'Asur – British forces captured the town of Deir Ballut before securing the new Palestinian front line at a cost of 1,300 casualties. It would hold until the next general advance in the fall.
- British submarine HMS D3 was bombed and sunk in the English Channel after it was mistaken for a German U-boat by a French airship, killing all 25 crew on board.
- The Fourth All Russian Conference of Trade Unions was held in Moscow with Mikhail Tomsky as council leader.
- A naval air station was established on Whiddy Island in Bantry Bay, Ireland but was closed the following year.
- D. W. Griffith released the war film Hearts of the World, with film star siblings Lillian and Dorothy Gish in the lead roles, as part of a propaganda effort by the British government to grow public support in the United States for the war effort.
- Born:
  - Elaine de Kooning, American artist, member of the abstract expressionism movement, wife to artist Willem de Kooning; as Elaine Marie Catherine Fried, in New York City, United States (d. 1989)
  - William E. Nichol, American politician from Nebraska; in Windsor, Colorado, United States (d. 2006)

== March 13, 1918 (Wednesday) ==
- Battle of Bakhmach – The Czechoslovak Legion defeated the Germans at Bakhmach, Ukraine at a cost of 145 killed, 210 wounded, and 41 missing. German forces suffered 300 dead and hundreds more wounded.
- Several groups of female Red Guards were recognized by the Finnish Red government as combat units during the Finnish Civil War, but newer all-female fighting units were discouraged from forming.
- The Marinens Flyvebaatfabrikk floatplane was given its first test flight.
- Japanese businessman Kōnosuke Matsushita founded the Matsushita Electric Industrial Company in Osaka as a wholesaler of light sockets. The company expanded to selling other electrical products and eventually became the electronics manufacturer Panasonic Electric Works, and its electronics brand name Panasonic.
- Al Jolson released a recording of the song "Rock-a-Bye Your Baby with a Dixie Melody", which was originally the opening song for the Broadway musical Sinbad.
- Born:
  - Eddie Pellagrini, American baseball player, infielder for the Boston Red Sox, St. Louis Browns, Philadelphia Phillies, Cincinnati Reds, and Pittsburgh Pirates from 1946 to 1954, baseball coach for Boston College from 1958 to 1988; as Edward Charles Pellagrini, in Boston, United States (d. 2006)
  - Grigory Pomerants, Soviet philosopher, noted dissident of Joseph Stalin, recipient of the Order of the Red Star; in Vilnius, Lithuania (d. 2013)
- Died: Henry Janeway Hardenbergh, 71, American architect, designer of famous hotels in New York City including the original Waldorf Astoria and the Plaza Hotel (b. 1847)

== March 14, 1918 (Thursday) ==
- A peace conference was held in Trebizond, Turkey between the Ottoman Empire and the Transcaucasian Commissariat delegation but failed to negotiate a lasting peace treaty, leading to new hostilities later in the spring.
- A mass execution of Red Guard prisoners in the aftermath of the Battle of Varkaus ended with a total 180 deaths. Of these, known as the "Lottery of Huruslahti", 87 were formal executions following courts-martial. Another estimated 100 perished in prison camps over the next few months.
- Attorney Eva Andén was elected as the first female member of the Swedish Bar Association.
- Born:
  - John McCallum, Australian actor and producer, best known for the Australian family television series Skippy the Bush Kangaroo; in Brisbane, Australia (d. 2010)
  - Abba Kovner, Israeli poet and partisan fighter, member of the Jewish resistance group United Partisan Organization during World War II, co-founder of Nakam, known for poetry works including Ad Lo-Or; in Oshmene, Belarus (d. 1987)
- Died:
  - Lucretia Garfield, 85, American social leader, First Lady of the United States, wife to U.S. President James A. Garfield, established the first presidential library (b. 1832)
  - Gennaro Rubino, 58, Italian anarchist, unsuccessfully tried to assassinate Leopold II of Belgium (b. 1859)
  - William Eakin, 89, Canadian politician, 4th Speaker of the Legislative Assembly of the Northwest Territories (b. 1828)

== March 15, 1918 (Friday) ==
- Battle of Tampere – An army of 16,000 White Guards launched an offensive to encircle 14,000 Red Guards at Tampere, Finland.
- Invasion of Åland – Germany called off negotiations with the Red Guards after reporting it was also entering talks with the White Guards.
- German submarine SM U-110 was depth charged and sunk in the Atlantic Ocean by Royal Navy ships with the loss of all 39 crew after sinking British ocean liner Amazon (her crew survived).
- German submarine SM UB-106 sank at Kiel, Germany with the loss of all 35 crew. She was raised three days later, repaired and returned to service.
- German flying ace Adolf Ritter von Tutschek, commanding officer of Jagdgeschwader 2, was shot down and killed by South Africa ace H. B. Redler of the Royal Flying Corps's No. 24 Squadron over France. He had 27 victories to his credit when he died.
- Royal Navy vessel HMS Furious re-entered service as the world's first aircraft carrier with aircraft lifts.
- Born:
  - Richard Ellmann, American literary critic, recipient of the National Book Award for Nonfiction for his biography on James Joyce; in Highland Park, Michigan, United States (d. 1987)
  - Punch Imlach, Canadian hockey coach, managed the Toronto Maple Leafs and Buffalo Sabres; as George Imlach, in Toronto, Canada (d. 1987)
- Died:
  - Lili Boulanger, 24, French composer, known for compositions Faust et Hélène and Les sirènes, first female recipient of the Prix de Rome, sister of Nadia Boulanger (b. 1893)
  - George Alexander, 59, English actor and stage producer, best known for his collaborations with St James's Theatre and playwright Oscar Wilde, including the premier of The Importance of Being Earnest (b. 1858)
  - Theodore S. Peck, 74, American army officer, commander of the Vermont National Guard, recipient of the Medal of Honor for action at Newport Barracks, North Carolina during the American Civil War (b. 1843)

== March 16, 1918 (Saturday) ==
- Battle of Tampere – The White Guards engaged in the fiercest fighting of the battle against the Red Guards at Länkipohja, Finland. An estimated 20 to 60 Red Guards were killed in combat, and another 70 to 100 were executed following the end of the battle.
- T. J. Ryan of the Australian Labor Party won his second term as Premier of Queensland for Australia during the state election, beating his opponent James Tolmie of the Nationalist Party with close to 54% of the vote.
- Born: Frederick Reines, American physicist, recipient of the Nobel Prize in Physics for the detection and study of the neutrino; in Paterson, New Jersey, United States (d. 1998)

== March 17, 1918 (Sunday) ==
- The Second All-Ukrainian Congress of Soviets was held in Dnipro, Ukraine with Volodymyr Zatonsky as chair, where it approved the Treaty of Brest-Litovsk.
- Västergötlands Fotbollförbund was formed as part of the Swedish Football Association and now manages 279 member clubs in Västergötland, Sweden.
- Born: Ross Bass, American politician, U.S. Representative from Tennessee from 1955 to 1964, and U.S. Senator from Tennessee from 1964 to 1967; in Pulaski, Tennessee, United States (d. 1993)
- Died: Hans Bethge, 27, German air force officer, commander of Jagdstaffel 30, recipient of the Iron Cross; killed in action (b. 1890)

== March 18, 1918 (Monday) ==
- The Progressive Citizens' Party won the majority of the seats over the opposing Christian-Social People's Party in the Liechtenstein general election.
- The Sugar Land Independent School District was established in Texas.
- Buster Keaton and Fatty Arbuckle both starred in the comedy film short The Bell Boy, with some of the comedic sequences reused by Keaton in his later movie Love Nest on Wheels.
- Finnish composer Jean Sibelius released the nationalistic choral Our Native Land to commemorate the tenth anniversary of the Finnish National Chorus.
- The sports club Grorud was established in Oslo. It has sections for association football, skiing, gymnastics and tennis.
- Born:
  - Nan Huai-Chin, Chinese philosopher, major leader in the revival of Chinese Buddhism; in Wenzhou, Republic of China (present-day China) (d. 2012)
  - Leonard L. Northrup Jr., American engineer, early designer of solar thermal energy; in Houston, United States (d. 2016)

== March 19, 1918 (Tuesday) ==
- A forest fire in Raetihi, New Zealand, killed three people and destroyed over 150 homes.
- The Taurida Soviet Socialist Republic was established in an attempt to replace the Crimean People's Republic on the peninsula, but German-backed Ukrainian forces overran the region within a month.
- Austrian ocean liner SS Linz struck a mine and sank in the Adriatic Sea, killing 697 passengers and crew, including 283 Italian prisoners of war.
- Air charter Det Norske Luftfartsrederi was established as the first airline in Norway.
- The football club Feirense was established in Santa Maria da Feira, Portugal, and now plays most of its matches in Marcolino de Castro stadium.
- While escorting a convoy off Queenstown, Ireland, the U.S. Navy destroyer USS Manley (DD-74) collided with HMS Montagua. The Manley's depth charges accidentally detonated, killing 34 crewmembers.
- Born: Jimmy Marks, British air force officer, commander of the No. 35 Squadron during World War II, recipient of the Distinguished Service Order and Distinguished Flying Cross; as James Hardy Marks, in Tolleshunt D'Arcy, England (d. 1942, killed in action)

== March 20, 1918 (Wednesday) ==
- The Donetsk–Krivoy Rog Soviet Republic joined the Ukrainian Soviet Socialist Republic.
- German submarine SM U-33 torpedoed and sank British cargo ship Yochow in the Mediterranean Sea with the loss of 50 crew.
- The Phillimore Report was released by committee headed by British lord Walter Phillimore with proposals for forming a League of Nations.
- The American Expeditionary Forces began setting up military hospitals in Vichy, France, with Hospital No. 1 taking up nine hotels to treat up to 3,600 wounded American soldiers. The first wounded soldiers began arriving April 11.
- Born:
  - Jack Barry, American television game show host and producer, one of the key figures in the 1950s quiz show scandals; as Jack Barasch, in Lindenhurst, New York, United States (d. 1984)
  - Marian McPartland, English-American jazz musician, best known for her National Public Radio program Piano Jazz; as Margaret Marian Turner, in Slough, England (d. 2013)

== March 21, 1918 (Thursday) ==
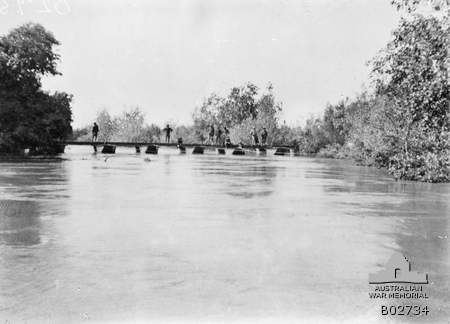
British troops cross the Jordan River during the first attack on Ottoman-held Jordan.

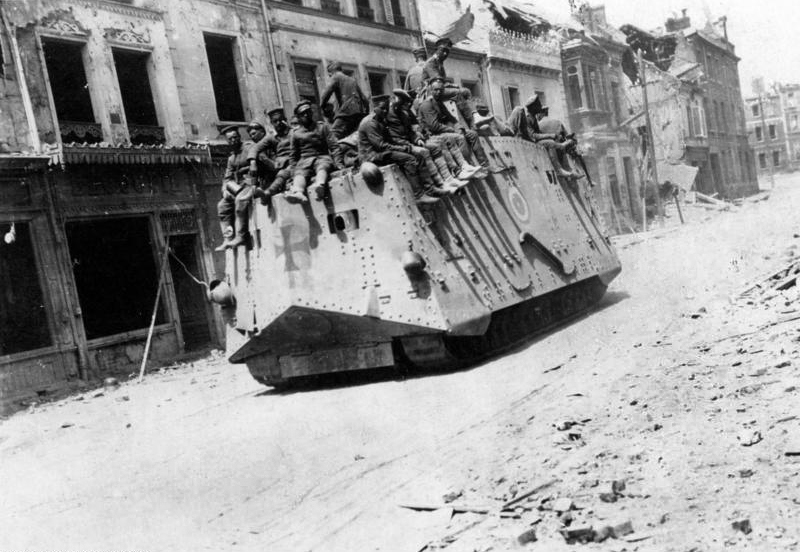
German tank in attacking during the German spring offensive in France.

- German spring offensive – The Imperial German Army launched Operation Michael along the Western Front against the British Fifth Army and the right flank of the Third Army at St. Quentin, France, killing nearly 20,000 British soldiers on the first day of the offense.
- The Egyptian Expeditionary Force began crossing the Jordan River at Hijla to begin its campaign against the Ottomans at Amman, Jordan.
- The Railroad Control Act became law in the United States, allowing the federal United States Railroad Administration to manage the entire American rail system until the end of World War I. Secretary of the Treasury William Gibbs McAdoo, son-in-law to U.S. President Woodrow Wilson, was appointed Director General of Railroads.
- John Bowser resigned as Premier of Victoria after his railway estimates bill was defeated in parliament. Harry Lawson became premier and formed a composite ministry of Liberal factions, including Bowser as Chief Secretary and Minister for Public Health.
- The Curtiss Dunkirk Fighter aircraft was first flown.
- The sports club Bahía Blanca was established in Bahía Blanca, Argentina. It is best known for its basketball team as well as gymnastics, handball, judo, karate, volleyball and yoga.
- Born:
  - Verna Fields, American film editor, best known for El Cid, American Graffiti, and Jaws; as Verna Hellman, in St. Louis, United States (d. 1982)
  - Patrick Lucey, American politician and diplomat, 38th Governor of Wisconsin, United States Ambassador to Mexico from 1977 to 1979; in La Crosse, Wisconsin, United States (d. 2014)

== March 22, 1918 (Friday) ==
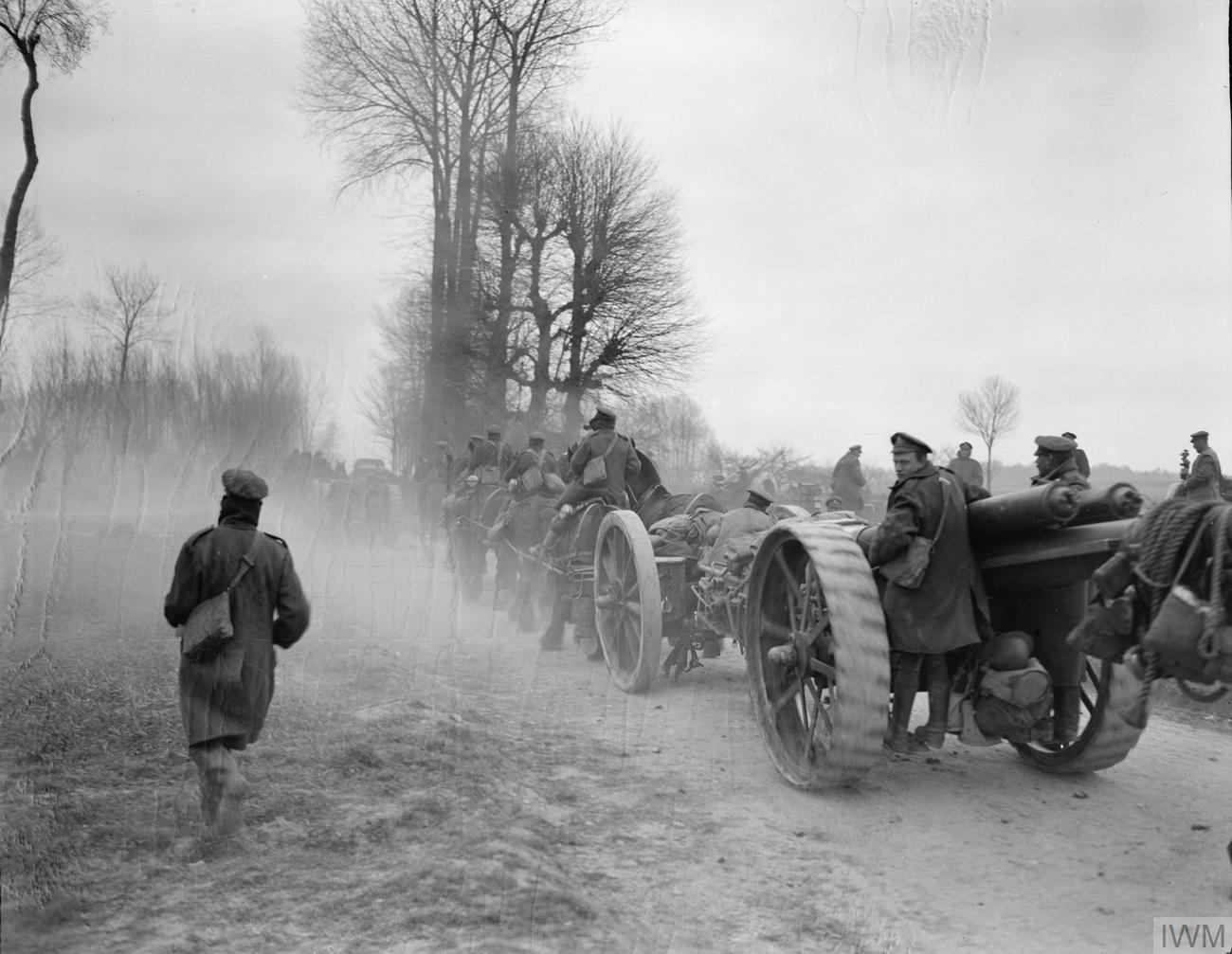
British troops retreating during the German spring offensive.

- Operation Michael – British forces retreated over the Somme River in the face of a powerful German advance.
- The Egyptian Expeditionary Force were able to establish the first of two bridgeheads on the opposite side of the Jordan River despite heavy opposition from the Ottomans.
- The Skansen Bridge opened to allow trains on the Dovre Line access to Trondheim Central Station in Norway.
- Born: Cheddi Jagan, Guyanese state leader, 4th President of Guyana; in Port Mourant, British Guiana (present-day Guyana) (d. 1997)

== March 23, 1918 (Saturday) ==
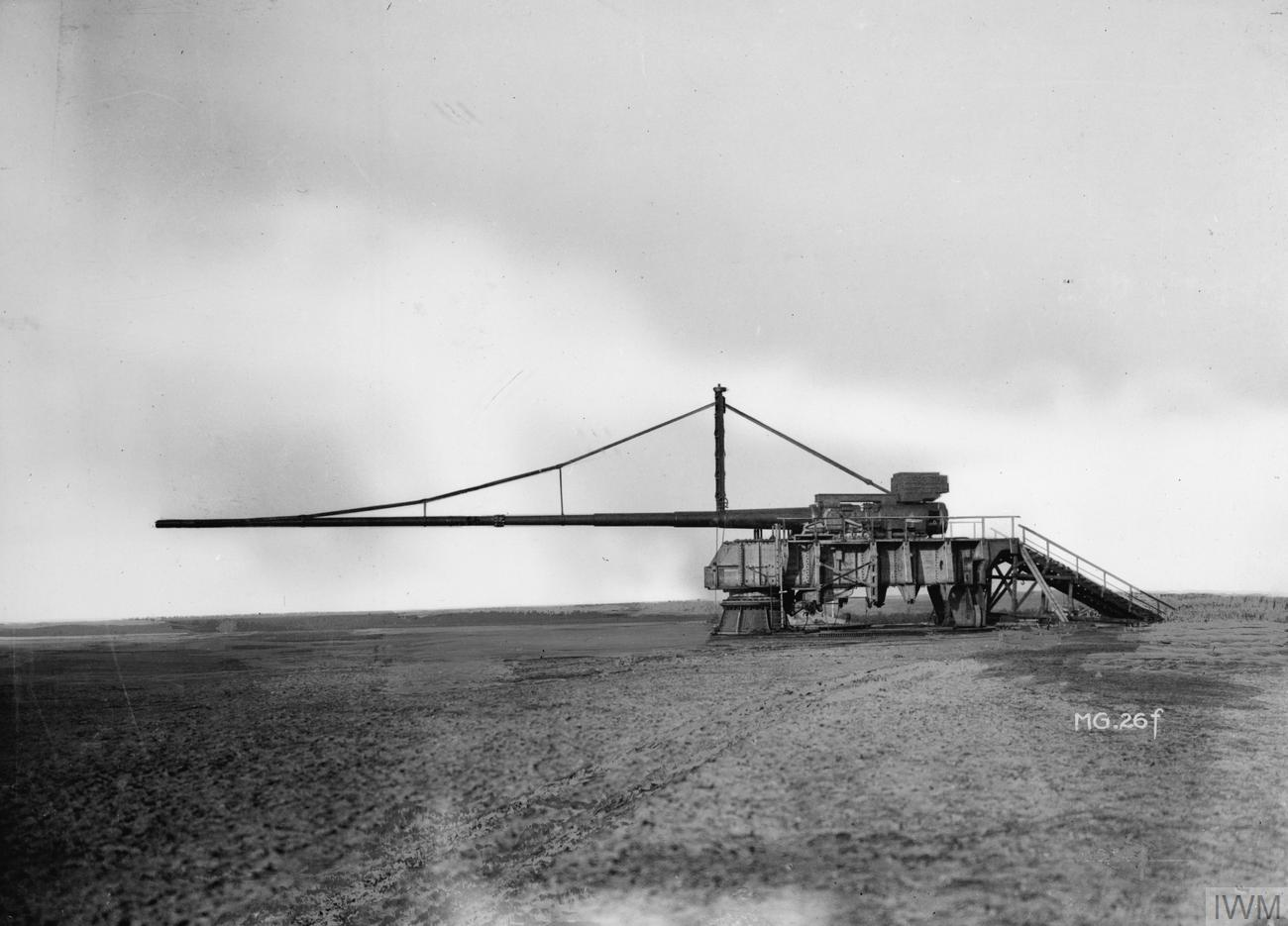
Paris Gun, the largest gun of World War I

- The giant German cannon, the 'Paris Gun' (Kaiser Wilhelm Geschütz), began shelling Paris from 114 km (71 mi) away, with bombardments continuing until August 7.
- Operation Michael – German forces broke through the reorganized British line at Jussy on the Canal de Saint-Quentin as British forces continue to fall back. Notable in the battle was a British platoon led by Lieutenant Alfred Cecil Herring that retook a captured bridge over Crozat Canal from the Germans and held it for 12 hours before being overwhelmed. Herring was awarded the Victoria Cross after the war.
- The Egyptian Expeditionary Force established the second bridgehead across the Jordan River.
- The Don Soviet Republic was established with Rostov-on-Don as its capital following the retreat of the anti-Bolshevik Volunteer Army. Its existence was short-lived when the Don Cossacks liberated the region in May.
- Battle of Tampere – The White Guards approached Tampere, Finland from the northeast and engaged defending Red Guards 10 kilometres east of the city.
- American magician William E. Robinson, under the stage name Chung Ling Soo, was critically injured during a performance at the Wood Green in London when a trick to "catch" two separate bullets failed and one of them perforated his lung. He died the following morning in the hospital.
- Composer Charles Wakefield Cadman premiered his opera Shanewis at the Metropolitan Opera in New York City.
- Born:
  - Émile Derlin Zinsou, Beninese state leader, 4th President of Dahomey; in Ouidah, Dahomey (present-day Benin) (d. 2016)
  - Stanley Armour Dunham, American army officer and business owner, maternal grandfather to Barack Obama; in Wichita, Kansas, United States (d. 1992)
  - Walter Jenkins, American civil servant, aide to U.S. President Lyndon B. Johnson; in Jolly, Texas, United States (d. 1985)
- Died: Robert Vaughn, 81, Welsh-American pioneer, co-founder of Great Falls, Montana (b. 1836)

== March 24, 1918 (Sunday) ==
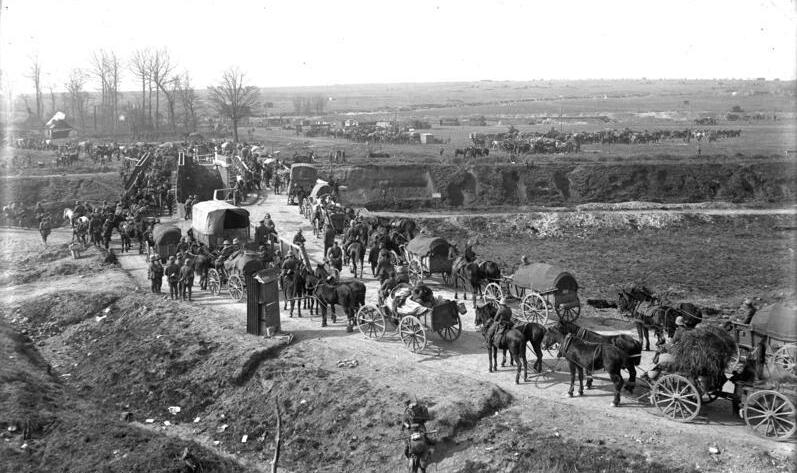
German supply column moving up near Étricourt-Manancourt, France.

- Operation Michael – Germany launched the second phase of its operation with an assault on Bapaume, France.
- ANZAC forces left the bridgehead at Ghoraniyeh to march on Amman, Jordan.
- Battle of Tampere – The Red Guards were forced out of the village of Lempäälä, Finland which held the critical point in the Riihimäki–Tampere railway. The White Guards were able to cut off supplies to the Reds in Tampere.
- Captain John Lightfoot Trollope of the Royal Flying Corps No. 43 Squadron shot down seven German aircraft in a day, although he was only officially recognized for six.
- Italian cruiser Partenope was sunk in the Mediterranean Sea off Algeria by German submarine SM UC-67, with all crew surviving.
- Born: Eero Kolehmainen, Finnish skier, silver medalist at the 1952 Winter Olympics; in Anttola, Finland (present-day Mikkeli, Finland) (d. 2013)
- Died:
  - John Anderson, 60, British colonial administrator, 22nd Governor of Ceylon (b. 1858)
  - Richard B. Fitzgerald, 74–75, American business leader, noted for promoting African-American owned and managed businesses including the Coleman Manufacturing Company in Concord, North Carolina (b. 1843)

== March 25, 1918 (Monday) ==
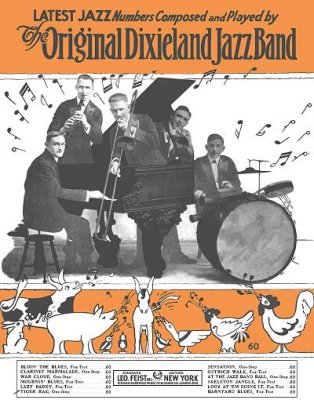
Sheet music for "Tiger Rag" the first recorded jazz single.

- The Belarusian Democratic Republic declared independence in Minsk.
- Operation Michael – The German assault on Bapaume ended while it launched a new attack on Noyon, France.
- ANZAC forces occupied the city of Es Salt as part of the campaign against the Ottomans in Jordan.
- Battle of Rautu – The White Guards launched a major offensive against the Red Guards dug in south of Rautu, Finland.
- Invasion of Åland – The Imperial German Navy launched a campaign on the archipelago near the Red Guard capital of Turku, Finland, capturing the island of Houtskär.
- Neville Ranch raid – Mexican border raiders made one last attack on private land in the United States with a raid on a ranch in Presidio County, Texas, resulting in two deaths.
- Karl Muck, music director of the Boston Symphony Orchestra, was arrested under the Alien Enemies Act and imprisoned for the remainder of World War I after expressing public sympathy for his native Germany.
- The Original Dixieland Jass Band released a second recording of the pioneering jazz hit "Tiger Rag" for Victor Records along with another single called "Skeleton Jangle". The recording was preserved in the National Recording Registry.
- Born: Howard Cosell, American sports journalist, noted TV sports personality for Monday Night Football and SportsBeat; as Howard William Cohen, in Winston-Salem, North Carolina, United States (d. 1995)
- Died:
  - Frederick C. Armstrong, 22, Canadian air force officer, commander of the No. 203 Squadron during World War I, recipient of the Distinguished Service Cross and Croix de guerre; killed in action (b. 1895)
  - Claude Debussy, 55, French composer, known for works including Prélude à l'après-midi d'un faune and Children's Corner, recipient of the Legion of Honour (b. 1862)
  - Walter Tull, 29, British football player and army officer, midfielder for Tottenham and Northampton, first black infantry officer to serve in the British Army; killed in action during the German spring offensive (b. 1888)

== March 26, 1918 (Tuesday) ==
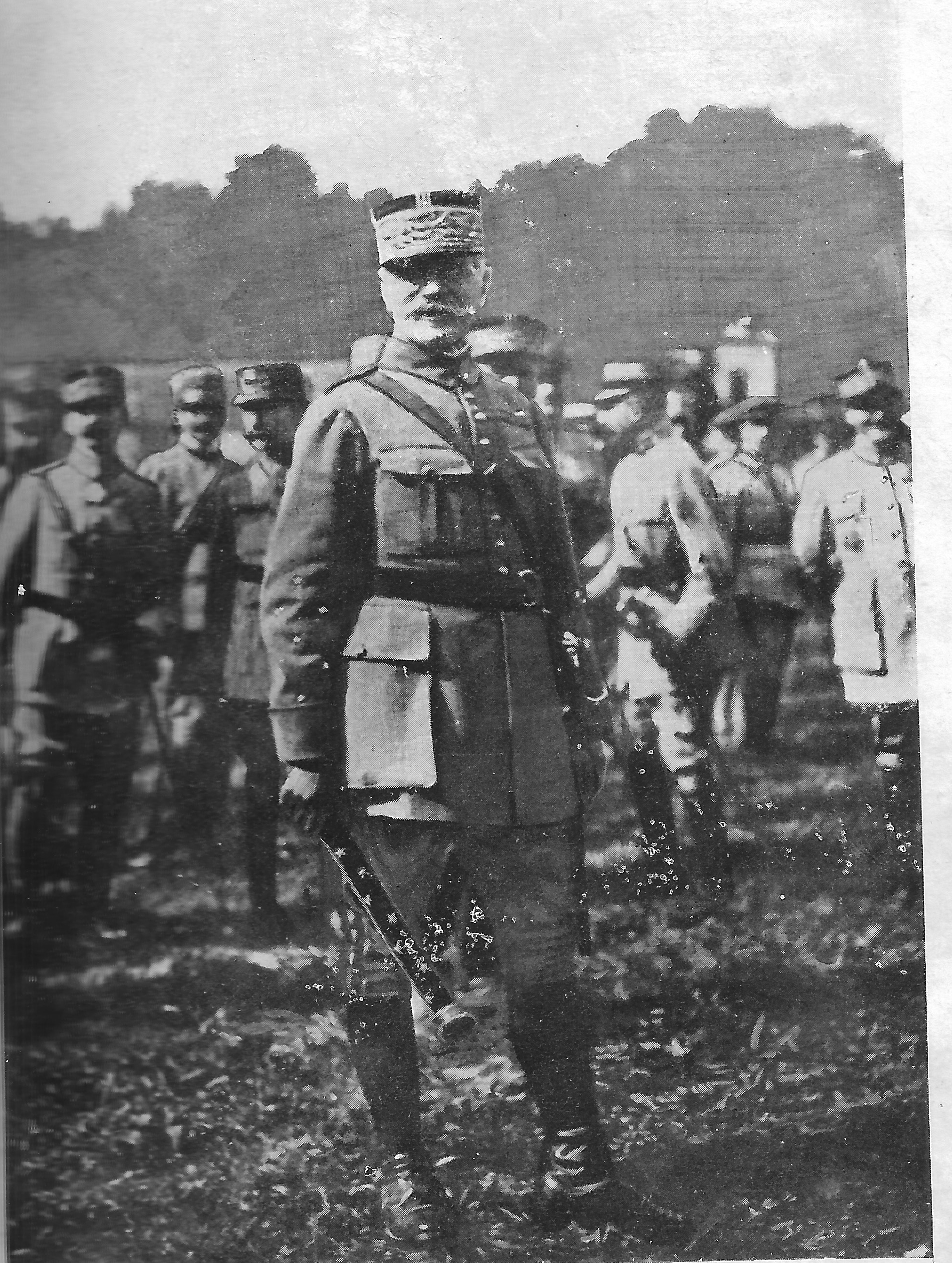
Supreme Allied Commander Ferdinand Foch

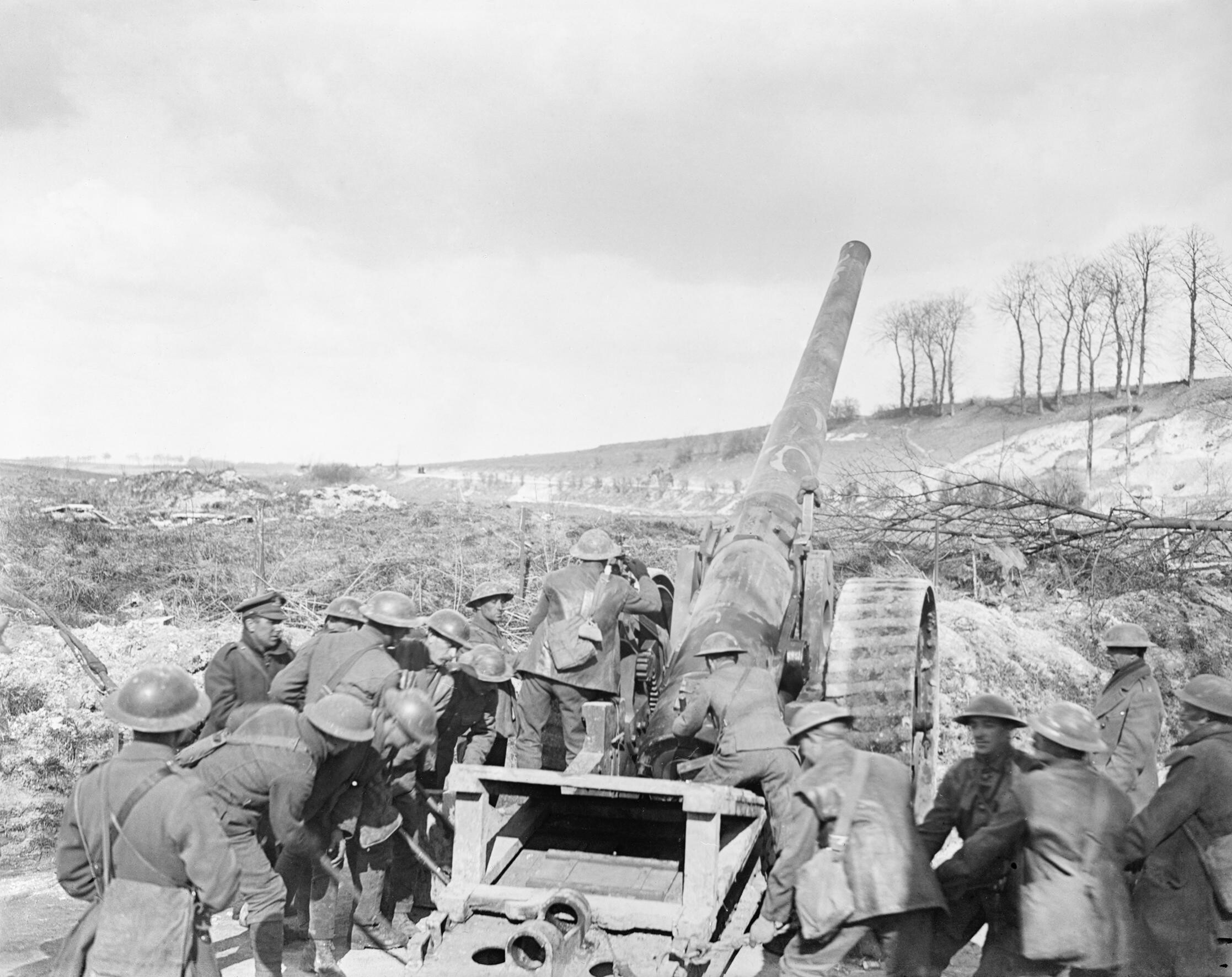
British artillery in action on the Ancre, France.

- Operation Michael – German forces attacked Rosieres, France.
- French and British military leaders gathered for the Doullens Conference to coordinate operations on the Western Front. It was there French Field Marshal Ferdinand Foch was appointed Supreme Allied Commander of all Allied forces.
- Battle of Tampere – The White Guards captured the Tampere–Pori railway 20 kilometres west of Tampere, Finland while the Reds launched a counterattack to recapture Lempäälä.
- Action of Khan Baghdadi – The 15th Indian Division captured nearly an entire Ottoman garrison of 5,000 men at the town of Khan al Baghdadi on the Tigris River in Mesopotamia (now Iraq).
- Royal Fleet Auxiliary mine carrier ship RFA Lady Cory-Wright was torpedoed and sunk in the English Channel by German submarine SM UC-17 with the loss of 39 of her 40 crew.
- German submarine SM U-61 was sunk in the Atlantic Ocean by a U.S. Navy ship with the loss of all 36 crew.
- While on a vehicle reconnaissance of the Western Front near Estrées-Deniécourt, France, Colonel Raynal Bolling of the Air Service of the American Expeditionary Force and his driver Private Paul L. Holder were ambushed by German soldiers. The gunfire disabled the car engine, forcing the two men into separate shell holes. When two German soldiers approached the hole Holder was in and attempted to shoot him, Bolling appeared from cover and shot one of the soldiers before the other killed him. Holder then played dead until the Germans left before he attempted to make his way back to headquarters, but was captured along the way and made a prisoner of war. He was only able to make a formal report on Bolling's death after the war ended.
- British feminist Marie Stopes published her influential book Married Love in the United Kingdom.
- The borough of Wrightstown, New Jersey was incorporated.
- Born: William C. Marland, American politician, 24th Governor of West Virginia; in Johnston City, Illinois, United States (d. 1965)
- Died: César Cui, 83, Lithuanian composer, known for such works including operas Prisoner of the Caucasus and Mlada (b. 1835)

== March 27, 1918 (Wednesday) ==
- First Battle of Amman – The Egyptian Expeditionary Force launched their first attack against the Ottoman defenses at Amman, Jordan.
- Operation Michael – German forces ended attacks on Rosieres, France with the capture of the commune of Albert, Somme.
- Royal Navy destroyer HMS Kale struck a naval mine and sank in the North Sea, killing 41 crew.
- Eighteen-year-old Canadian fighter pilot Alan Arnett McLeod of the Royal Flying Corps No. 2 Squadron, and his observer Arthur William Hammond, shot down four German Fokker fighter planes over Albert, Somme, France before their Armstrong Whitworth plane was shot down. McLeod managed to crash-land in no man's land where, despite being seriously injured himself, carried the badly wounded Hammond to the British lines. McLeod received the Victoria Cross for his actions on September 4 at the age of 19, becoming the youngest airman to be awarded the medal in World War I.
- The Germans re-designated their Shutzstafffeln (escort squadrons) as Schlasta (attack squadrons) in recognition of their close air support achievements during Operation Michael.
- The first aircraft manufactured by the U.S. Navy's aircraft factory, a Curtiss Model H, made its first flight only 228 days after ground was broken for the factory at the League Island Navy Yard in Philadelphia.
- Born: Richard T. James, American engineer, inventor of the spring toy Slinky; in Philadelphia, United States (d. 1974)
- Died:
  - Henry Adams, 80, American historian, author of The History of the United States of America 1801–1817, posthumous recipient of the Pulitzer Prize for The Education of Henry Adams, son of Charles Francis Adams Sr. (b. 1838)
  - Martin Sheridan, 36, Irish-American Olympic field athlete, three-time gold medalist at the 1904 and 1908 Summer Olympics (b. 1881)

== March 28, 1918 (Thursday) ==
- Operation Michael – German forces attacked Arras, France.
- First Battle of Amman – Ottoman forces began successful counterattacks against the British at Amman, Jordan.
- Battle of Tampere – The White Guards attempted to fight their way into Tampere, Finland while sustaining some of the heaviest casualties of the battle in what was dubbed "Bloody Thursday". Casualties were estimated at 200 killed while the Red Guards lost 50 to 70 fighters, including their commander Hugo Salmela who was killed by a hand grenade exploding in his headquarters. The White Guards called off the attack for the next five days and only shelled the town.
- The Red Army took control of the Idel-Ural State in Kazan and re-established it as a Soviet state.
- Invasion of Åland – The Germany navy captured the Finnish island of Korpo near Turku, Finland.
- Protests in Quebec City against conscription turned into riots over the Easter weekend.
- The South African financial group Sanlam was established in Cape Town.
- The film crime drama The Whispering Chorus, directed by Cecil B. DeMille, was released to controversy for depictions of crime and violence, including a climatic execution scene involving an electric chair. The film was the sixth-highest grossing of the year.
- Born:
  - Edward Amy, Canadian army officer, commander of The Canadian Grenadier Guards during World War II, recipient of the Order of the British Empire, Distinguished Service Order, Canadian Forces' Decoration, Military Cross and Bronze Star Medal; in Newcastle, New Brunswick, Canada (d. 2011)
  - David Ferrie, American pilot, alleged conspirator by New Orleans district attorney Jim Garrison in the assassination of U.S. President John F. Kennedy; in Cleveland, United States (d. 1967)
  - Reg Rattey, Australian soldier, member of the 25th Battalion during World War II, recipient of the Victoria Cross for action during the Bougainville campaign; as Reginald Roy Rattey, in Barmedman, Australia (d. 1986)
  - Alberto Valdés, Mexican American painter; in El Paso, Texas, United States (d. 1998)

== March 29, 1918 (Friday) ==
- First Battle of Amman – British forces faced a deteriorating situation including low ammo, bad weather, boggy conditions that made equipment hard to move, and continuous counterattacks from the Ottomans.
- Born:
  - Pearl Bailey, American singer and actress, winner of the Tony for Hello, Dolly!, recipient of the Presidential Medal of Freedom; in Newport News, Virginia, United States (d. 1990)
  - Shirley Jameson, American baseball player, center fielder for the All-American Girls Professional Baseball League from 1943 to 1946; in Maywood, Illinois, United States (d. 1993)
  - Sam Walton, American business executive, founder of Walmart and Sam's Club; as Samuel Moore Walton, in Kingfisher, Oklahoma, United States (d. 1992)
- Died: Harry Fulton, 48, New Zealand army officer, commander of the New Zealand Rifle Brigade, recipient of the Order of St Michael and St George, Distinguished Service Order, and Croix de guerre; killed in action at Colincamps, France (b. 1869)

== March 30, 1918 (Saturday) ==
- March Days – A joint Bolshevik-Armenian force sent to investigate a rumor of an armed revolt led by the political group Musavat in Muslim-dominant Baku, Azerbaijan was met with gunfire in the city port, igniting the Armenian–Azerbaijani War.
- Operation Michael – German forces attacked Villers-Bretonneux, France. During the battle, Canadian cavalry officer Lieutenant Gordon Flowerdew of the Lord Strathcona's Royal Canadian Horse 'C' Squadron led a cavalry charge against the oncoming Germans at Moreuil Wood. The unit suffered atrocious casualties including Flowerdew, but the action helped halt the German advance. Flowerdew was posthumously awarded the Victoria Cross.
- First Battle of Amman – A British night attack on the main citadel in Amman, Jordan failed, forcing the Egyptian Expeditionary Force to begin its retreat back to the Jordan River.
- The Canadian government enacted the War Measures Act of 1914 to allow complete federal power in Quebec City as anti-conscription riots intensified.
- British flying ace Alan Jerrard, recipient of the Victoria Cross and seven victories to his name, was shot down by Austrian ace Benno Fiala Ritter von Fernbrugg and taken captive.
- The Toronto Arenas defeated the Vancouver Millionaires three games to two in the Stanley Cup Final.
- The Canadian National Institute for the Blind was established to assist Canadian veterans who had lost their sight due to injury while serving in World War I, as well as many survivors who lost their sight in the Halifax Explosion in 1917.
- Thomas Edison sold his film studio to the Lincoln & Parker Film Company to help pay off debts accrued after U.S. federal courts ruled his company violated antitrust laws.
- Born:
  - Joaquín Gutiérrez, Costa Rican writer, known for literary works including Cocorí and Te acordarás, hermano; as Joaquín Gutiérrez Mangel, in Limón Province, Costa Rica (d. 2000)
  - Gerald Francis O'Keefe, American clergy, Bishop of Saint Paul from 1961 to 1966 and Bishop of Davenport from 1966 to 1993; in Saint Paul, Minnesota, United States (d. 2000)
- Died:
  - Lionel de Jersey Harvard, 24, English academic, descendant of John Harvard, founder of Harvard College, and so the first Harvard to attend Harvard University; killed in action during the German spring offensive near Arras (b. 1893)
  - Paul J. Pelz, 76, German-American architect, designer of the Library of Congress in Washington, D.C. (b. 1841)

== March 31, 1918 (Sunday) ==
- Daylight saving time officially went into effect in the United States.
- First Battle of Amman – British forces withdrew from attacking Amman, Jordan and retreated back into the Jordan Valley with a loss of 1,348 casualties.
- March Days – Attempts to disarm Musavat-led militia in Baku, Azerbaijan failed, prompting Soviet commissioner Prokofy Dzhaparidze for the Bolshevik-Armenian joint force to report "Musavat had launched a political war." An Armenian force began massacring thousands of civilians, mostly Muslim, throughout the city.
- A militia of 780 federal soldiers entered Quebec City to quell anti-conscription riots.
- Battle of Rautu – The Finnish Red Guards were able to beat back the Finnish White Guard offensive.
- British ocean liner Celtic was torpedoed and damaged in the Irish Sea by German submarine SM UB-77 with the loss of six lives. She was beached but later refloated, repaired and returned to service.
- The American Aviation Acceptance Park, later renamed Orly Air Base, was established south of Paris.
- French filmmaker Maurice Tourneur released his silent film fantasy masterpiece The Blue Bird. It is preserved by the Library of Congress and the National Film Registry.
- Born: Marv Grissom, American baseball player, pitcher for the San Francisco Giants during the 1954 World Series; as Marvin Edward Grissom, in Los Molinos, California, United States (d. 2005)
