= Aravaipa =

Aravaipa can refer to

- Aravaipa Canyon Wilderness, a wilderness area located in the U.S. state of Arizona
- Aravaipa Creek, a major drainage between three mountain ranges in southwest Graham County, Arizona
- Aravaipa, Arizona, formerly Dunlap, a former populated place, on Arizona Gulch, in Arizona
- The Aravaipa Apache people, whose home is the San Carlos Apache Indian Reservation in southeastern Arizona, United States
