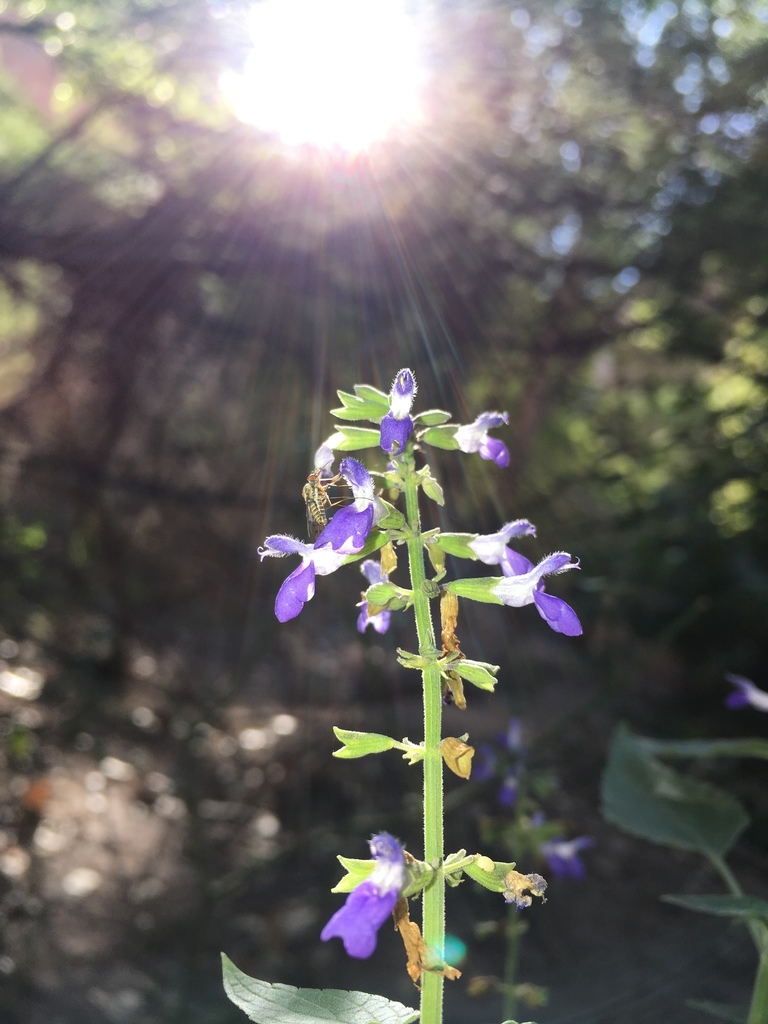

Scientific classification
- Kingdom: Plantae
- Clade: Tracheophytes
- Clade: Angiosperms
- Clade: Eudicots
- Clade: Asterids
- Order: Lamiales
- Family: Lamiaceae
- Genus: Salvia
- Species: S. amissa

Binomial name
- Salvia amissa Epling

= Salvia amissa =

Species of flowering plant

Salvia amissa, the Santa Catalina Mountain sage, Galiuro sage, or Aravaipa sage, is a herbaceous perennial plant that is endemic to Arizona, growing in the Galiuro Mountains and the Superstition Mountains. The type specimen is from the Santa Catalina Mountains, though plants have not been recorded there in recent years. S. amissa grows at 455 to 1,526 m (1,493 to 5,007 ft) elevation in gravel, sand, and silt in canyon bottoms shaded by ash, walnut, sycamore, and mesquite.

Salvia amissa grows up to 1 m (3.3 ft) tall with simple, opposite, deltoid-ovate leaves. The pale lavender to purple flowers are 6 to 7 mm (0.24 to 0.28 in), growing in whorls, blooming July–October.
