= Aravaipa, Arizona =

Ghost town in Graham County, Arizona

Coordinates: 32°57′26″N 110°21′18″W

Aravaipa, formerly Dunlap, is a former populated place north of Klondyke in Graham County, Arizona. Located on Arizona Gulch, a tributary of Deer Creek, itself tributary to Aravaipa Creek, Aravaipa lies at an elevation of 4600 feet.

== History ==
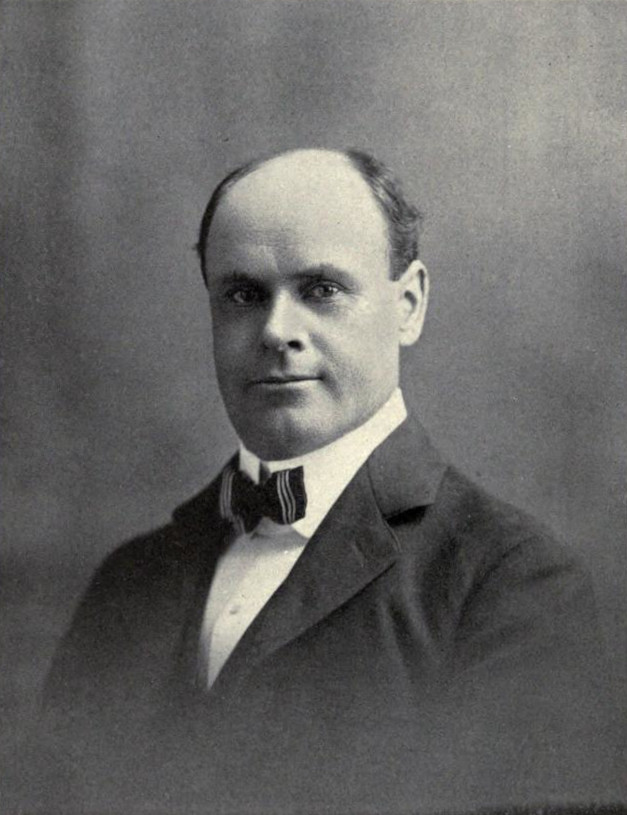
Burt Dunlap, original namesake of Aravaipa

Originally a ranch headquarters, named Dunlap after Burt Dunlap, the local rancher who established it in 1882. Burt Dunlap was the postmaster of the post office from 1883 until 1892. He also served several terms in the territorial legislature. When it was found there was already a post office with the same name, the post office and town were renamed after the local Aravaipa Apache. In 1893 the post office was closed.

Aravaipa's population was 17 in 1900, and 12 in 1920.

Aravaipa, a mining and ranching town, boasted a school, store, and a pool hall. Today there are a few buildings and outhouses left.
