= Power's Cabin shootout =

1918 shooting in Arizona

Coordinates: 32.5939°N 110.3454°W

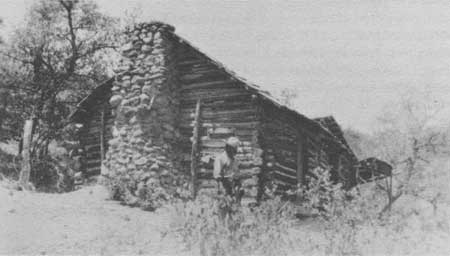
- The Power's Cabin as it appeared before restoration and the removal of the kitchen at the rear
- Date: February 10, 1918
- Location: Galiuro Mountains, Arizona, United States
- Outcome: 4 killed 2 wounded

The Power's Cabin shootout, or the Power Brothers shootout, occurred on February 10, 1918, when a posse attempted to arrest a group of miners at their cabin in the Galiuro Mountains. Four men were killed during the shootout, including three lawmen and Jeff Power, the owner of the cabin. The Power brothers, Tom and John, then escaped to Mexico with a man named Tom Sisson, but they were eventually caught after what was then the largest manhunt in the history of Arizona.

== Background ==
The Power family composed of "Old Man" Jeff, the father, his wife, Martha, three sons; Charles, John, and Tom, and one daughter; Ola May. They were originally from Texas, but moved to Arizona Territory in 1909 and homesteaded in lower Rattlesnake Canyon, south of Klondyke. Two years later, Charles bought a nearby goat ranch, which is now known as Power's Garden, and the family moved there. After improving the ranch by adding more rooms to the cabin, the Powers began importing cattle. Life was not easy though; the Powers family lived "in what was still a rough and occasionally violent frontier," so the brothers often had to find work at the neighboring ranches or mines.

In 1897, Martha Power was killed in a roof collapse accident in Gila, New Mexico. By 1917 the cattle ranch had been sold and Charles had moved away to New Mexico. Later that year, Jeff Power purchased Perry Tucker's one-quarter interest in the Abandoned Claims, an old gold mine in nearby Keilberg Canyon, which is now known as Power's Mine. Hard workers, the Power family and a friend named Tom Sisson built a twenty-five mile wagon road "through some of the roughest country imaginable" to their mine. The road ran from the Haby Ranch, several miles north of Klondyke on Aravaipa Creek, south for about twelve miles before dropping down Power's Hill into Rattlesnake Canyon, then up the canyon to the Abandoned Claims at Keilberg Canyon. Sisson and the Powers built a cabin to live in and, when they were in control of three-quarters of the property, they purchased a second-hand stamp mill.

According to a county coroner, on December 6, 1917, Ola May Power age 22 "came to her death from an unknown cause." Since then there has been much speculation about her death, but it remains an unsolved mystery. Soon after Ola's death, the Powers moved to a cabin located on a hill overlooking the entrance to their mine. By this time the United States had entered World War I and a draft had been instituted. All able bodied men were obliged to register, but, according to the Power brothers, when they attempted to do so, the recruiter said that they were not needed. To the contrary, the United States Forest Service history of the area says that Jeff convinced his sons to dodge the draft.

John and his brother assumed they had nothing to worry about, but after they went home the police were informed of the alleged draft evasion. In mid-January 1918, just after the Powers had completed preparations to begin extracting ore from their mine, the Graham County sheriff, Robert Frank McBride, sent a man named Jay Murdock to deliver a message to the Powers. In the message, Sheriff McBride explained the situation and requested that the boys surrender peaceably. However, Jeff may have assumed that the sheriff would not enforce the law, as his sons remained at home with him.

== Shootout ==
After the Power brothers failed to arrive in Klondyke, Sheriff McBride assembled a posse consisting of himself, Deputy Marshal Frank Haynes, and two sheriff's deputies; Martin Kempton and T. K. "Kane" Wootan. Marshal Haynes carried arrest warrants for John and Tom Power and Sheriff McBride had warrants for Jeff Power and Tom Sisson, who were wanted for questioning in connection with Ola May's death. On February 9, 1918, the posse drove from Klondyke to the Upchurch Ranch, where they borrowed horses and saddles for the journey south to Power's Cabin.

The posse arrived at the cabin later that night, but they did not attempt to make an arrest immediately. Instead they took up positions surrounding the cabin and waited until morning. Just before dawn, on February 10, Old Man Jeff Power woke up and built a fire in the fireplace. A few moments later, John made a fire in their wood-burning stove. Then the horses outside started making noise, which in turn made the dog start barking. Jeff knew something wasn't right so he grabbed his rifle and went to the front door, which faced east.

From here there are two different versions of the shootout; the Power brothers' and that of Deputy Haynes, the sole surviving member of the posse. According to Haynes, who made a statement a few days after the shootout, as soon as Jeff stepped outside, Deputy Wootan shouted: "Throw up your hands! Throw up your hands!," but someone inside the cabin, either John or Tom, started shooting through the doorway. Haynes then drew his weapon and fired two shots through the door and one through a window as he and McBride ran to take cover behind the northern wall of the cabin. Wootan and Kempton also started shooting, but the latter was shot dead shortly thereafter either by Jeff Power or from somebody inside. Wootan mortally wounded Jeff with a bullet to the chest and immediately afterward he fired at Tom Power, who was looking out of a window. Pieces of glass struck Tom on the left side of his face, but he managed to take aim at Wootan, who was trying to get away, and kill him with a single shot to the back.

Meanwhile, Sheriff McBride and Deputy Haynes were "hugging" the northeastern corner of the cabin. At some point, Haynes suggested that he go check the back side of the cabin and when he returned he found McBride dead. According to Haynes, empty bullet casings indicated that Tom Sisson had "poked his rifle through a crack in the logs and put three bullets into the sheriff." Haynes then retreated to where the posse had left their horses and after mounting up he rode to Klondyke as fast as he could.

The shootout lasted only a few minutes and about twenty-five shots were fired. Sheriff McBride, Deputy Kempton, and Deputy Wootan were dead and all three of the Powers were wounded; Tom was struck in the face by glass and John received splinters in the face after a bullet hit the doorjamb he was lying next to. Jeff Power died later that night.

== Aftermath ==
A United States Marshals wanted poster for Tom Sisson and the Power brothers.

As soon as the fighting was over, Tom Sisson and the Power brothers carried Jeff inside and made him comfortable. They then took their weapons and the horses that were left by the posse and started riding south towards the town of Redington. From there they headed east before crossing the international border with Mexico at a point south of Hachita, New Mexico.

Several posses were assembled to search for the fugitives, but Sisson and the Power brothers managed to evade them all. However, the United States Cavalry soon joined the hunt and captured the three men on March 8, 1918, apparently without resistance.

All three were found guilty of first-degree murder and sent to the prison at Florence. Sisson died in custody at the age of eighty-six, but the Power brothers endured and were released in 1960. Nine years later, Governor Jack Richard Williams pardoned them.

Tom Power died in San Francisco, California in September 1970 and John lived around Aravaipa Canyon until 1976. The Power family never got a chance to ship any ore from their mine and it was eventually purchased by the Consolidated Galiuro Gold Mines Inc. in the early 1930s. Unfortunately for them, the Galiuros proved to be a poor area for gold mining; historically, the district yielded only 163 ounces of gold.

In 1975, the Powers' Cabin was placed on the National Register of Historic Places and restored by the United States Forest Service.

"Old Man" Jeff Power is buried with his sons, his wife, and his daughter at the Klondyke Cemetery. His grave says that he was "Shot down with his hands up in his own door."

== See also ==
- List of Old West gunfights
- Graham County Sheriff's Office
- Battle of Bear Valley
