= Redfield Canyon Wilderness =

Protected area in Cochise and Graham Counties, Arizona

- IUCN category Ib (wilderness area)
- Redfield Canyon Wilderness

- Location within the United States
- Location: Graham County, Arizona, Cochise County, United States
- Nearest city: Willcox, AZ
- Coordinates: 32°26′28″N 110°18′02″W
- Area: 6,600 acres (27 km^{2})
- Established: 1990
- Governing body: U.S. Department of Interior Bureau of Land Management

Redfield Canyon Wilderness is a protected wilderness area on the southern end of the Galiuro Mountains in the U.S. state of Arizona. Established in 1990 under the Arizona Desert Wilderness Act the area is managed by the Bureau of Land Management and south of the Coronado National Forest managed Galiuro Wilderness. This area is primarily centered around its namesake canyon, a narrow chasm connected to many side canyons with perennial streams.

The wilderness ranges from 3,400 (1036 m) to 6,200 (1889 m)and is home to an abundance of wildlife including mule deer, pronghorn, desert bighorn sheep, coyotes, mountain lions, and American black bears.

== See also ==
- List of Arizona Wilderness Areas
- List of U.S. Wilderness Areas
