= Santa Teresa Mountains =

Landform in Graham County, Arizona

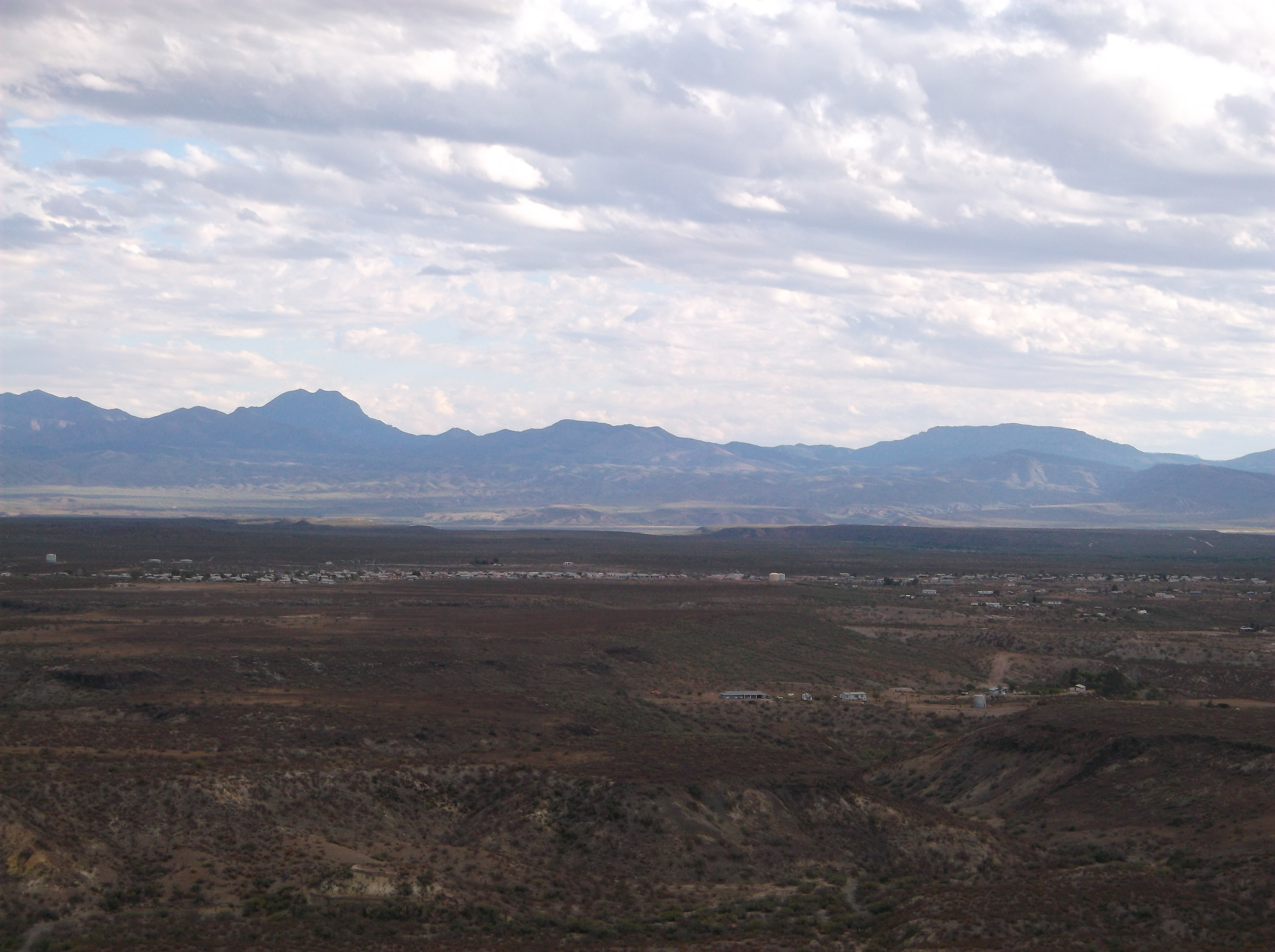

Highest point
- Peak: Mount Turnbull, San Carlos Apache Indian Reservation, Arizona
- Elevation: 8,282 ft (2,524 m)

Dimensions
- Length: 19 mi (31 km)
- Width: 11 mi (18 km)

Geography
- Location within Arizona
- Country: United States
- State: Arizona
- Regions: Arizona transition zone and Sonoran Desert
- County: Graham County, Arizona
- Settlement: Fort Thomas, Arizona
- Range coordinates: 32°58′01″N 110°17′34″W
- Borders on: Aravaipa Creek, Mescal Mountains, Gila Valley, Galiuro Mountains and Pinaleno Mountains

The Santa Teresa Mountains are a mountain range located within the Coronado National Forest and partly within the San Carlos Apache Indian Reservation, in western Graham County, Arizona. The highpoint of the range located in the Coronado National Forest section is 7,481 ft (2,280 m), however the high point of the entire range is Mt. Turnbull at 8,282 ft (2,524 m) elevation and is located on the reservation. Hiking or recreational activity in the San Carlos Indian Reservation section of the mountain range may require special permission and/or a permit at the cost of a small fee.

The Santa Teresa Wilderness area is in the range. It is attached north with the North Santa Teresa Wilderness.

== Black Rock ==
Black Rock is an important landmark, in the eastern region of the range. It is important in the heritage of Native Americans.

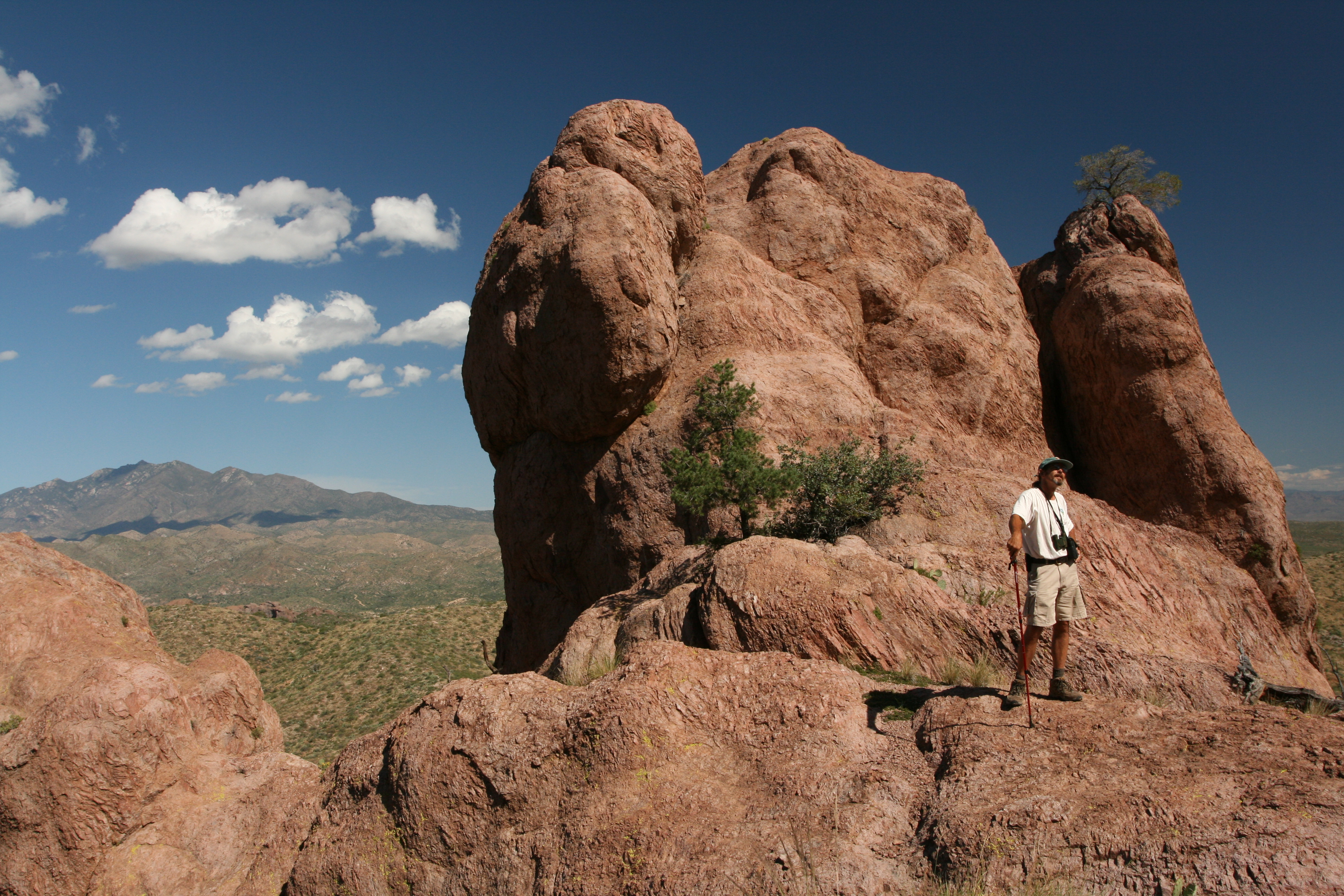
Black Rock
