= Klondyke, Arizona =

Populated place in Graham County, Arizona

- Populated place
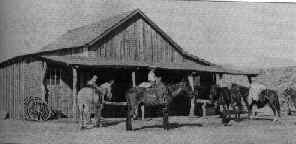
- The general store at Klondyke in 1910
- Interactive map of Klondyke, Arizona
- Coordinates: 32°50′07″N 110°19′56″W
- Country: United States
- State: Arizona
- County: Graham
- Elevation: 3,465 ft (1,056 m)

Population
  - Total: 50
- Time zone: MST (no DST)
- GNIS feature ID: 42873

Klondyke is a populated place in Graham County, Arizona, United States that was founded circa 1900 by some miners who had recently returned from Alaska after participating in the Klondike Gold Rush. The town is located west of Safford in the Aravaipa Valley. The Galiuro Mountains lie to the southeast and the Santa Teresa Mountains to the north.

== History ==
The mainstay of the town was the lead and silver mines, as well as the nearby cattle ranches. Klondyke's population peaked at 500, but today there are only about a dozen residents.

The first general store in town was started by a Mr. Bedoya inside a tent, but in 1904 he built a saloon, a wooden store, and a post office that was opened in 1907. The store burned down at one point, but Bedoya immediately built a new one. The town also had the Klondyke School and a church.

During the Great Depression, half of the town's residents left and the post office closed in 1955. The site today may be classified as barren, although the Klondyke General Store and the Power's Cabin, located south of the town, have been preserved as a historic sites and is now open to tourists.

=== Power's Cabin Shootout ===
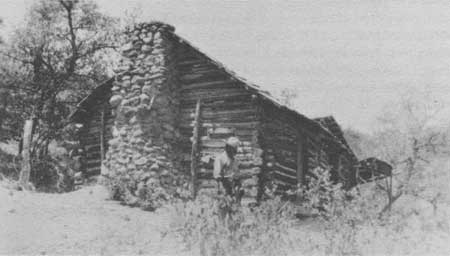
The Power's Cabin as it appeared before restoration.

According to Bobby Zlatevski, "Klondyke is the home of one of Arizona's most notorious stories which has elements of 'Old West' tragedies." The Klondyke Cemetery, located southeast of town, holds the remains of "Old Man" Jeff Power, his mother, Martha Jane, his sons, John and Tom, and his daughter, Ola May.

In 1915, Martha Jane was killed in a horse and buggy accident and two years later, Ola died of an unknown cause. Then, just weeks after Ola's death, Jeff Power and three lawmen were killed when the latter attempted to make an arrest for draft evasion and perjury at the former's cabin in the Galiuro Mountains. Both John and Tom were also slightly wounded and with the help of a family friend, Tom Sisson, they managed to evade what was then the largest manhunt in Arizona history and escape into Chihuahua, Mexico. However, the United States Army picked up their trail and captured them on March 8, 1918, without resistance. All were later found guilty of first-degree murder and sent to the prison in Florence. Tom Sisson died in custody in 1957 and the Power brothers were released in 1960.
