= Klondyke School District =

School district in Arizona, United States

Address
- 921 West Thatcher Boulevard Sadford, Arizona, 85546; United States

District information
- Type: Public
- NCES District ID: 0404200

Klondyke School District 9 is a school district in Graham County, Arizona that serves the town of Klondyke. The district is part of a consortium run by the Graham County Superintendent of Education.
