= Aravaipa Creek =

Creek in Graham County, Arizona

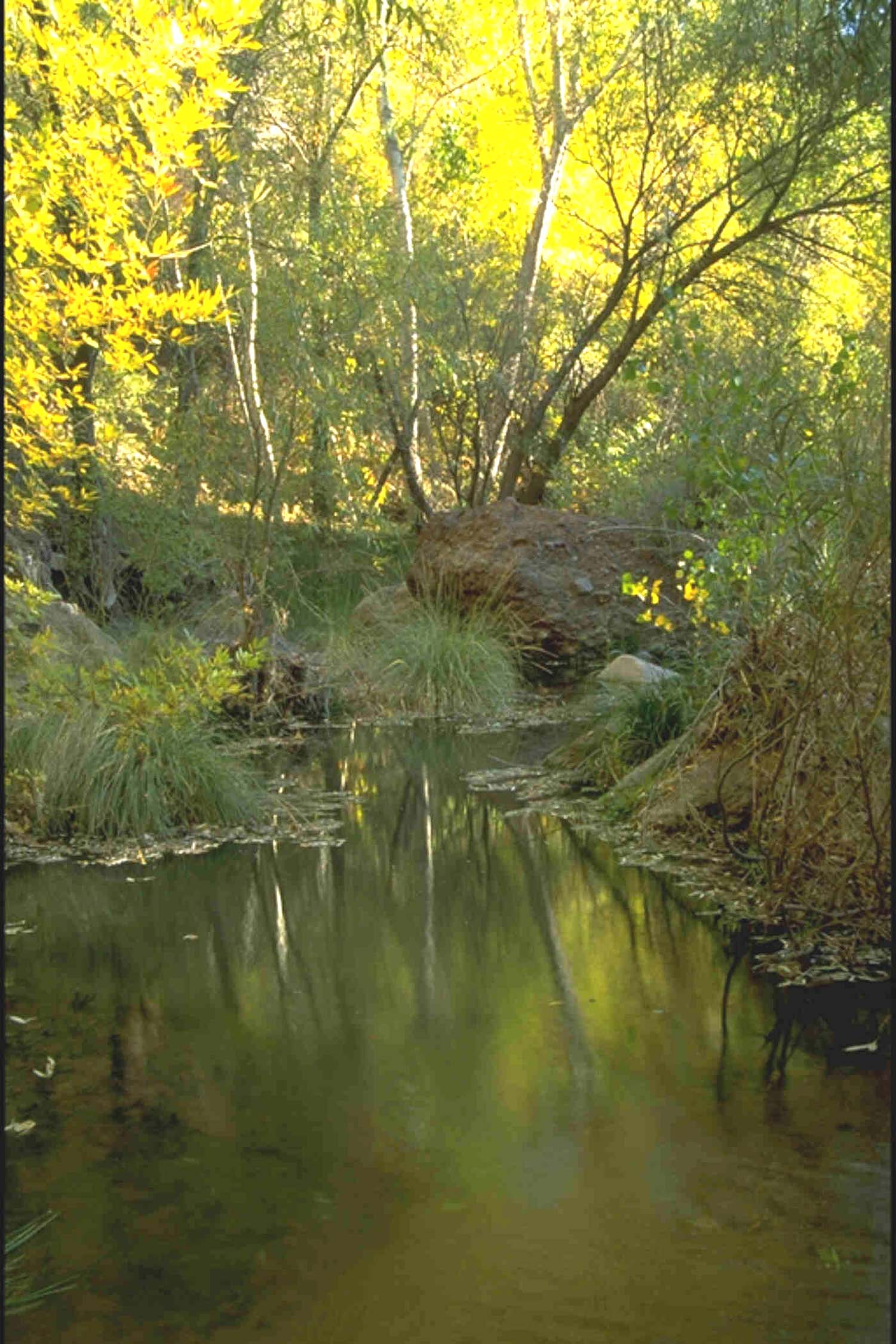
- Aravaipa Creek in Aravaipa Canyon Wilderness

- Central Aravaipa Valley and Creek

Location
- Country: United States
- Cities: Mammoth–Winkelman
- Location: Graham County, Aravaipa Valley (northeast Sonoran Desert), Arizona

Physical characteristics
- Source
  - elevation: 8,889 ft (2,709 m) above sea level
- Mouth
  - location: San Pedro River south of Winkelman
  - coordinates: 32°50′17″N 110°42′56″W
- Length: 55 mi (89 km)

Basin features
- River system: Gila River
- Borders: Galiuro Mountains-NW & SW; Santa Teresa Mountains-NE; Pinaleno Mountains-SE; (The Tablelands & Mescal Mountains-NW)

Aravaipa Creek is a drainage between three mountain ranges in southwest Graham County, Arizona – the Galiuro Mountains, the Santa Teresa Mountains and the Pinaleno Mountains. These mountains are part of the high altitude Madrean Sky Islands located in southern Arizona and New Mexico in the United States, and northern Sonora and Chihuahua states in Mexico.

Aravaipa Creek originates on the southeast flank of the Galiuro Mountains at Durkee Canyon and Blue Peak at 8,889 feet (2,709 m). It then flows northwest through the narrow, fault-blocked Aravaipa Valley with the Pinaleno Mountains bordering the valley on the east and the Santa Teresa Mountains bordering on the northeast. On the west side of the valley, the creek follows the northeast and north perimeter of the Galiuro Mountains massif flowing northwest, west, and then southwest through and around the range's north end to meet the San Pedro River a few miles south of Dudleyville.

The town of Klondyke is located in the heart of the Aravaipa Valley about 35 miles west from Eden which is located on U.S. Route 70. There is also access to Klondyke via Arizona State Route 266 to Bonita (passing near Fort Grant) and thence on a gravel road north through the valley. Bonita may also be accessed by gravel road north from Willcox.

West of Klondyke in the Galiuro Mountains is the location of the well known Power's Cabin shootout. The former populated area of Aravaipa is located at the end of the Klondyke Road on the slopes of the Santa Teresa Mountains, north of Klondyke.

Aravaipa Canyon at the north end of the Galiuro Mountains contains the Aravaipa Canyon Wilderness. The creek goes northwest then southwest through the canyon and downstream about 9 miles (14 km) to meet the San Pedro River and Arizona State Route 77 between Dudleyville and Mammoth. Access to the eastern end of the wilderness is located north of Klondyke on the Klondyke Road.

== See also ==
- List of rivers of Arizona
