= Battle of Bakhmach =

World War I battle in Ukraine

Coordinates: 51°10′58″N 32°49′38″E

- Part of the Eastern Front (World War I)
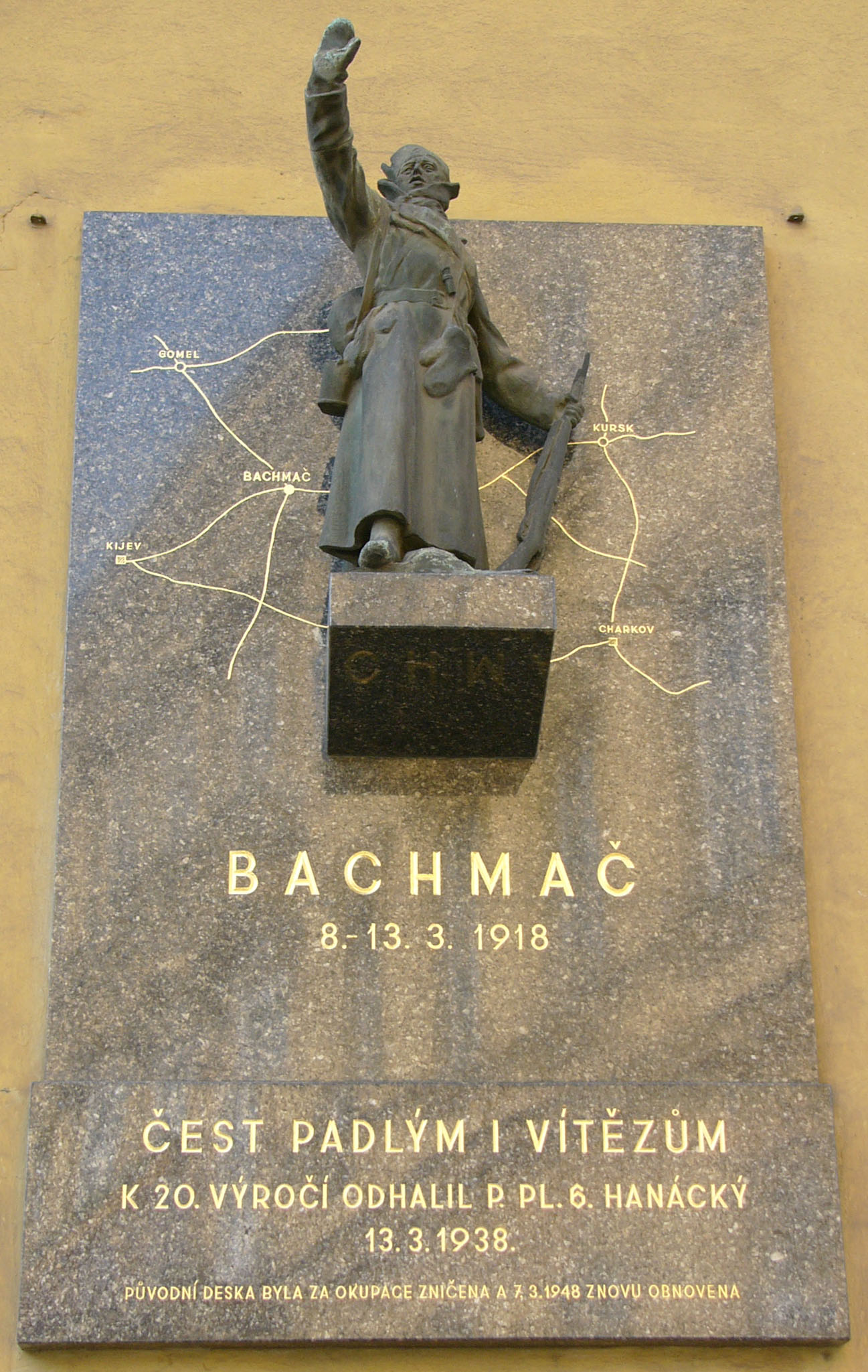
- Memorial plaque of Battle of Bakhmach in Olomouc (Czech Republic). Statue of legionar in winter uniform was made by Otakar Španiel.
Date	8–13 March 1918
Location	Bakhmach, Ukraine
Result	Czechoslovak Legion/Soviet victory

Belligerents
Entente Powers: (Bohemia) Czechoslovak Legions (Russian Socialist Federative Soviet Republic) Soviet Russia	Central Powers: (German Empire) Germany

Commanders and leaders
(Bohemia) Ludvík Krejčí (Russian Socialist Federative Soviet Republic) Nikolai Krylenko	(German Empire) Johannes von Eben

Strength
Parts of the 6th Hanácký Regiment, the 7th Tatranský Regiment and the 4th Prokop Holý Regiment	224th Infantry Division, 91st Infantry Division

Casualties and losses
145 killed, 210 wounded, 41 missing	Around 300 killed, hundreds wounded

Battle of Bakhmach (Bitva u Bachmače in Czech), was one of the last battles on the Eastern Front in World War I between the Entente-backed Czechoslovak Legion, Soviet Russia and the Central Powers occupying Ukraine after the Treaty of Brest-Litovsk. The battle lasted from March 8 to March 13, 1918, over the city of Bakhmach and was the last engagement in World War I for the Soviets. Following a Legion victory, the Germans negotiated a truce.

== Prelude ==
On 3 March 1918, Russia, controlled by the Bolsheviks, signed the Treaty of Brest-Litovsk with Germany, in which it gave up control over Ukraine.

On 8 March, German troops reached Bakhmach, an important rail hub, and in doing so threatened the Czechoslovak Legion with encirclement. The threat was especially grave since captured legionnaires were summarily executed as traitors of Austria-Hungary because at the time Czechoslovakia was part of Austria. The 6th "Hanácký" and 7th "Tatranský" Rifle Regiments, together with the Assault battalion of Czechoslovak Army Corps of the Legion, set up defenses at the town against incoming German 91st and 224th Infantry Divisions.

== Battle ==
The battle was notable because the troops were not only fighting for the Bakhmach railway junction (victory of Stanislav Čeček), but also for the bridge over the river Desna, which led to bloody battles at Doch. The climax of the fighting occurred on March 10. Thanks to the Legion victory, the Germans negotiated a truce, during which Czechoslovak armoured trains could freely pass through Bakhmach railway junction to Chelyabinsk.

The Czechoslovak Legion (about 42,000 soldiers) during the truce set up for escape from Russia via the Trans-Siberian Railway. The armies of Germany and Austria-Hungary then started to occupy the land without much resistance.

The Bolsheviks considered the German action at Bakhmach a violation of the terms of the Treaty of Brest-Litovsk and stood by the side of the Czechoslovak people at Bakhmach against the Germans, but it was of no significant help.

Losses of the Legion were: 145 killed, 210 wounded, 41 missing. Estimate of German losses is around 300 dead and hundreds wounded.

Similarly to the Battle of Zborov or the "Siberian anabasis", the battle of Bakhmach became one of the symbols of the Czechoslovak Legions and their fight for independence.

== Gallery ==
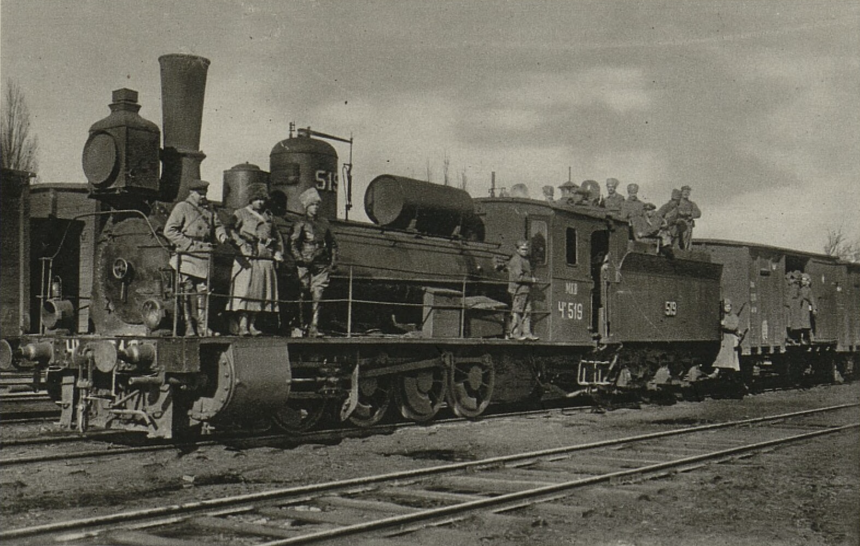
Military intelligence of the 6th Regiment "Hanácký" heading to Bakhmach, March 1918

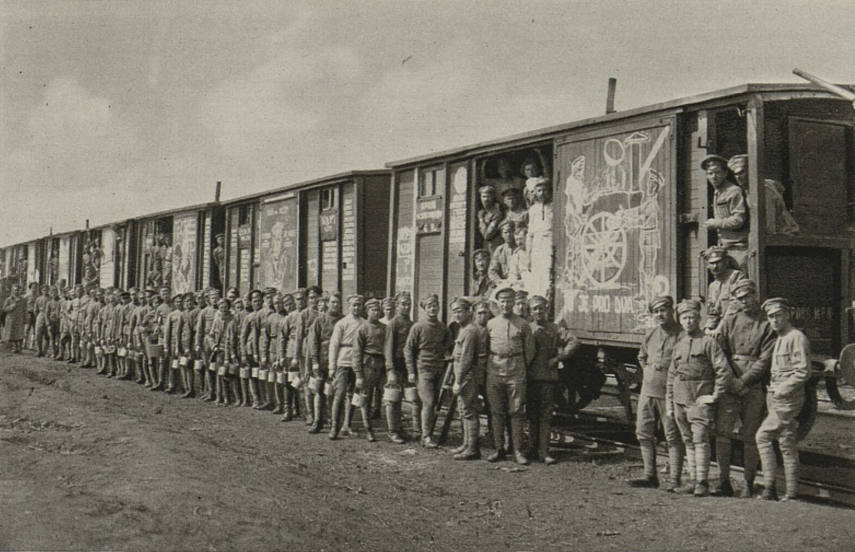
Decoration of the train of the 6th Regiment "Hanácký" of the Czechoslovak legions

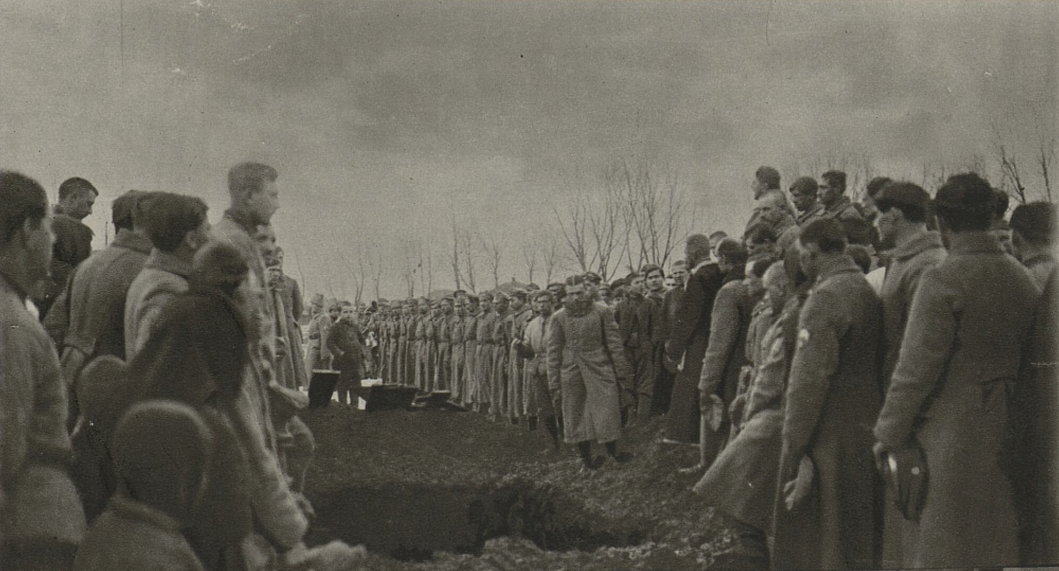
Prof. Prokop Maxa speaks at the funeral of the fallen soldiers following the battle

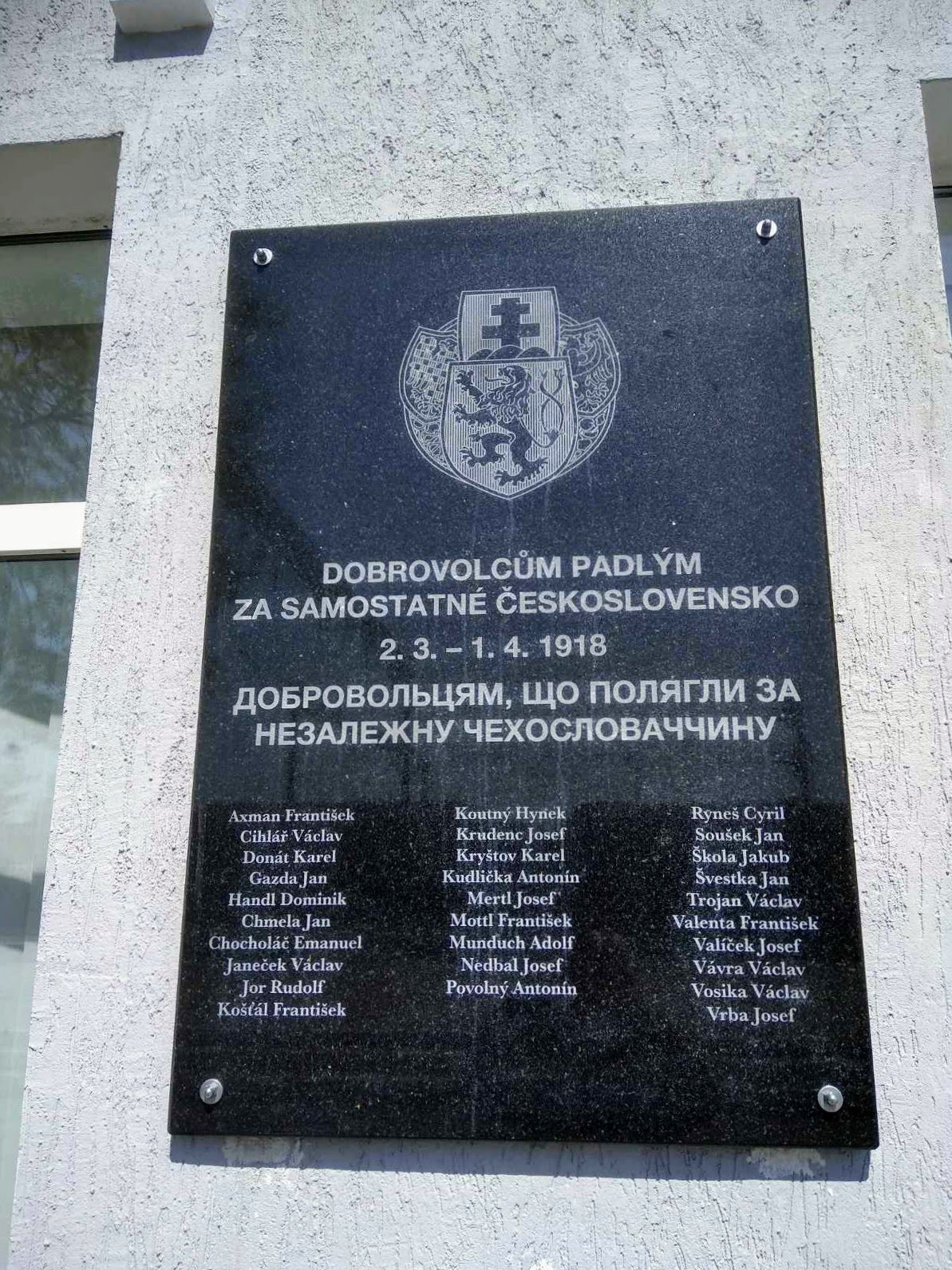
Memorial plaque to the memory of fallen Czechoslovaks located on Bakhmach railway station

== Sources ==
- Václav Cháb: "Německý vpád na slovanský východ : kus dějin - kus boje o budoucnost", Prague, 1938
- Václav Cháb: "Bachmač : březen 1918", Prague, 1948
- Karel Goš: "Bitva u Bachmače byla slavnou epizodou Hanáckého pluku : největší oslavy proběhly v roce 1938", article in newspaper Olomoucký den, March 20, 1999, page 10
- PRECLÍK, Vratislav. Masaryk a legie (Masaryk and legions), váz. kniha, 219 str., vydalo nakladatelství Paris Karviná, Žižkova 2379 (734 01 Karviná) ve spolupráci s Masarykovým demokratickým hnutím (Masaryk Democratic Movement, Prague), 2019, ISBN 978-80-87173-47-3, pages 50 - 70, 72 - 100, 124 - 128,140 - 148,184 - 190
- M. Vlachynský: "V březnu 1918 bojovali legionáři u Bachmače", article in newspaper Českobudějovické listy, March 14, 1998, page 12
- Adolf Kubíček: Hanáci v revoluci (Hanakians in revolution: The Chronicle of 6th Czechoslovak Rifle Regiment), Olomouc, 1928
