= Galiuro Wilderness =

Protected area in Graham County, Arizona

- IUCN category Ib (wilderness area)
- Location within the United States
- Location: Graham County, Arizona, United States
- Nearest city: San Manuel, Arizona
- Coordinates: 32°35′12″N 110°19′48″W
- Area: 76,317 acres (309 km^{2})
- Established: 1964
- Governing body: U.S. Forest Service

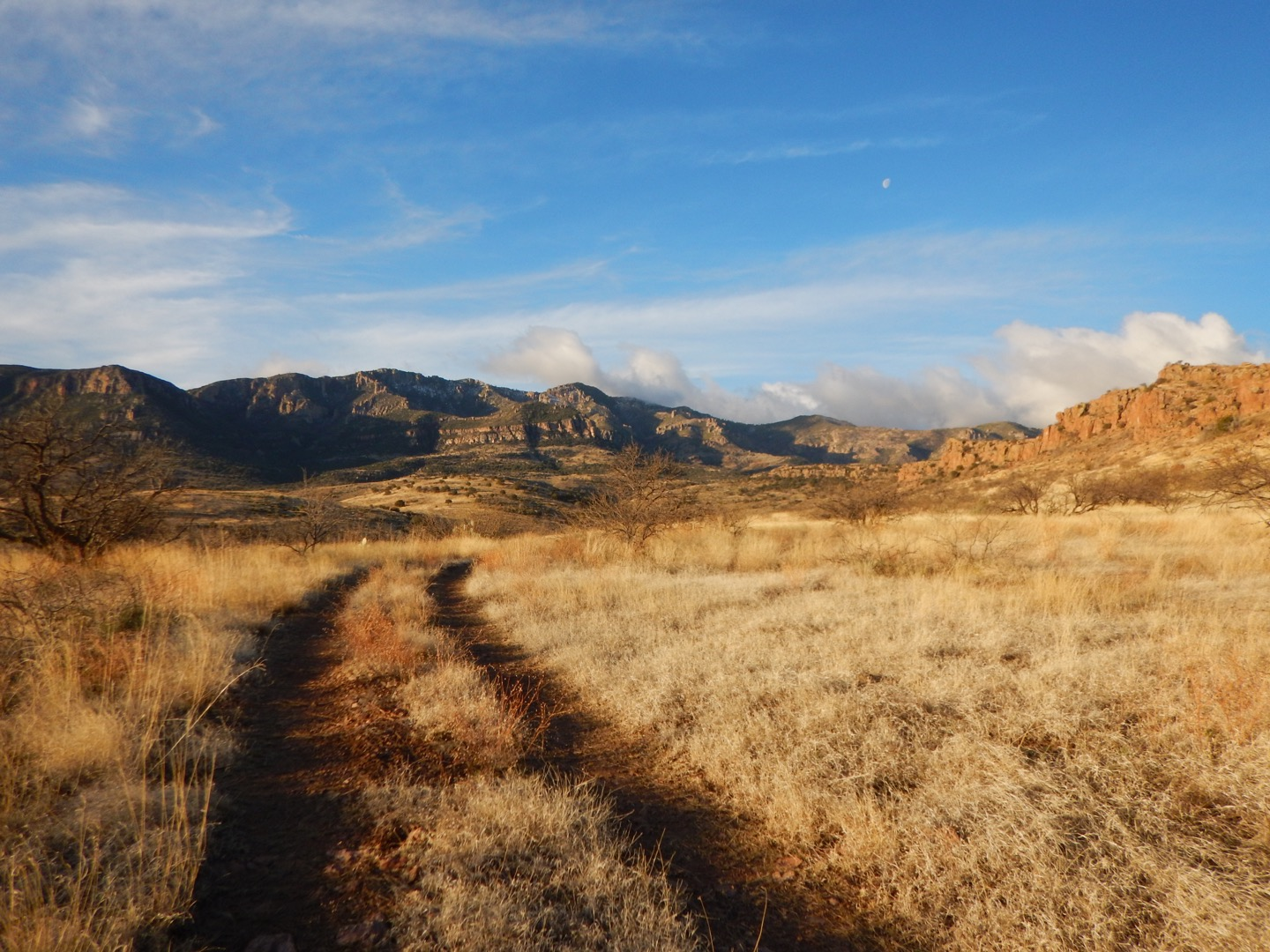
View of the Galiuro Mountains from the Deer Creek Trailhead

Galiuro Wilderness is a 76,317-acre (309 km^{2}) wilderness area encompassing the mid to upper slopes of the Galiuro Mountains. It is located within the Safford Ranger District of the Coronado National Forest in the American state of Arizona. It is bordered on the south by the Redfield Canyon Wilderness.

== Topography ==
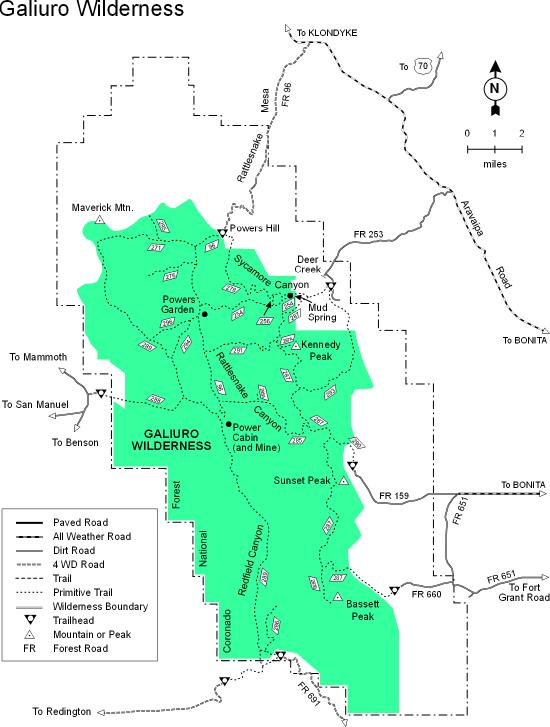
Map of Galiuro Wilderness Area

Elevations in the Galiuro Wilderness range from 4,000 feet (1,219 m) to 7,671 feet (2,338 m) at the summit of Bassett Peak. The Galiuro Mountain Range is a very rough and brushy block fault range characterized by block-like uplifts rising abruptly from relatively level plains that are characteristic of southern Arizona. Erosion has produced many rugged cliffs and steep slopes which have brightly colored exposed soils and rocks. The mountain is a double range bisected by two main canyons, Rattlesnake and Redfield. The wilderness boundary generally follows the forest boundary on the west and approximately one mile east of Trail 287 on the east. The most prominent peaks and high points in the Wilderness include Bassett Peak at 7,671 feet (2,338 m), Kennedy Peak at 7,540 feet (2,298 m), and Sunset Peak at 7,094 feet (2,162 m) along the east divide. Those along the west divide include Rhodes Peak at 7,116 feet (2,169 m), Maverick Mountain at 6,990 feet (2,131 m), and Kielberg Peak at 6,880 feet (2,097 m).

== Vegetation ==
The vegetation growing in Galiuro Wilderness varies from species of the semi-desert grassland type to those of the mixed conifer type. The majority of the south and west-facing slopes of the Galiuro Range are covered with dense stands of manzanita, live oak, mahogany and other brush species. The higher slopes and ridgetops have moderate to dense stands of juniper, pinon pine, and oak trees. Along the canyon bottoms and on the northern slopes of the higher elevations grow Arizona cypress, Ponderosa pine, Chihuahua pine, Mexican white pine, Douglas fir, and smaller stands of white fir. Deciduous trees such as sycamore, alder, maple, ash, walnut, and aspen grow in the riparian areas where springs supply water almost year-round, including Power's Garden, Mud Spring, Corral Spring, Juniper Spring, South Field Spring, Kielberg Dam, Walnut Spring, Cedar Spring, and Holdout Spring.

== Wildlife ==
A variety of wildlife can be found in the Galiuro Wilderness, including large mammals such as desert mule deer, pronghorn, desert bighorn sheep, Coues’ white-tailed deer, collared peccary, Mearns coyote, New Mexico black bear, and North American cougar. Smaller mammals include desert cottontails, ground squirrels, raccoon, white-nosed coati, foxes, skunks, and bobcat. Birds include quail, doves, and the band-tailed pigeon.

== History ==
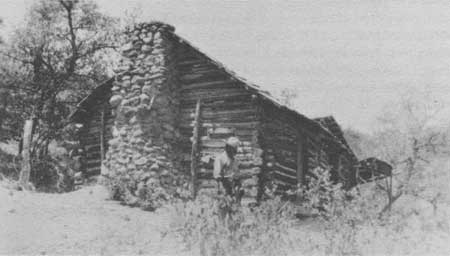
The Power's Cabin, site of the Power Brothers Shootout in 1918.

Original native inhabitants of the area are believed to be the Jacome Indians, a little-known group possibly related to the Apaches.

White settlers began arriving in the mid-19th century, taking up prospecting and later mining and ranching in the 1890s. In 1909, Jeff Power and his family homesteaded in Rattlesnake Canyon and began mining nearby. When two of Power's sons, Tom and John Power, failed to report when drafted into World War I, Sheriff Robert F. McBride of Graham County delivered a letter to the Powers asking them to come in for prosecution, but it was ignored. Several weeks later, on the night of February 9, 1918, Deputy United States Marshal Frank Haynes, Sheriff McBride, and Deputy Sheriffs Martin Kempton and TK "Kane" Wootan arrived at the Power's cabin near the Power's Mine. They carried arrest warrants for Tom and John Power for draft evasion, and warrants for Jeff Power and his hired man, Tom Sisson, who were wanted for questioning. Just before dawn on February 10, as he was preparing breakfast, Jeff heard two of their horses gallop by their dogs began barking. When Jeff Power stepped outside with his rifle Deputy Sheriff Wootan yelled, "Throw up your hands! Throw up your hands!" A furious gunfight ensued, leaving Sheriff McBride, Deputy Sheriffs Kempton and Wootan, and Jeff Power dead. Marshal Haynes escaped to nearby Klondyke, Arizona, while the Power boys and Tom Sisson fled south to Redington on the San Pedro River. They entered Mexico south of Hachita, New Mexico, where on March 8 they surrendered to a United States Army patrol that had picked up their trail and crossed the border in pursuit. At their trial, all three men were convicted of first-degree murder and sentenced to life imprisonment. Sisson died in prison at the age of 86, but the Power brothers were paroled in 1960, forty-two years after their conviction. They were pardoned by Governor Jack Richard Williams nine years later. In 1975, the Power's Cabin was placed on the National Register of Historic Places.

In 1932, Congress set aside 52,717 acres (213 km^{2}) in the Galiuro Mountains as the Galiuro Primitive Area within the Crook National Forest. It was renamed the Galiuro Wild Area in 1940, with administration shifting to the Coronado National Forest in 1953. With the passage of the Wilderness Act in 1964, the area was redesignated the Galiuro Wilderness. A last addition in 1983 incorporated the floor of Rattlesnake Valley into the wilderness, bringing it to a total of 76,317 acres (309 km^{2}).

In January 1943, a World War II B-24 bomber on a training run crashed near the summit of Bassett Peak, killing all eleven men on board. A plaque mounted on one of the wings commemorates their final resting place.

=== Life of Tom Sisson ===
Thomas Joseph W. Sisson was born on June 9, 1869, in Livonia Township, Sherburne County, Minnesota. He was the youngest child of Russell and Mary (Hagebone) Sisson. His father, Russell Sisson, was a Union veteran of the Civil War, having served as a Private in Company H of the 57th Pennsylvania Infantry. He died sometime after 1895, but probably before 1900, as he does not appear in the Census of 1900.

A United States Marshals wanted poster for Tom Sisson and the Power brothers.

Sisson was the youngest in the family. His next oldest sibling, sister Lucretia, was born nearly ten years before him. By 1880, at age 11, he was motherless. The Federal census of that year indicates just he and his 65-year-old father living in the household. Five years later, the Minnesota State Census of 1885 indicates that it was still just he and his elderly father, indicating that he spent much of his childhood alone.

In March 1890, Sisson enlisted as a private in Troop E, 1st United States Cavalry in St. Paul. He was then sent to Fort Custer. However, after the Kelvin Grade Massacre, the 1st Cavalry was sent to Fort Grant, Arizona to pursue the Apache Kid, who was never captured.

On June 16, 1895, Sisson was discharged from the army at Fort Grant. His discharge indicated he was an "excellent" soldier. He remained in Arizona as indicated by his next documented appearance in the U.S. Census of 1900. At the age of thirty, he was boarding with two other young men in the home of Bud Snow in Cochise, Arizona. In 1910, Tom was once again recorded as a resident of the Arizona Territory. He was living in his own rented house and lists his occupation as "plumber".

Although the United States Marshal's wanted poster indicates that Sisson was a "paroled convict", there is currently no documentation regarding his involvement in any criminal activity prior to the gunfight at the Power's Cabin in February 1918. [However, on October 2, 1913, Sisson was convicted of being a horse thief – he had been indicted on a charge of grand larceny for stealing a horse from an Indian and was given a sentence of not more than ten nor less than one years at the State prison; a certificate of reasonable doubt was granted and a bond of $1,000 was granted; he was paroled by Governor George W. P. Hunt.]

After being convicted, Tom was sentenced to life in prison. He escaped briefly in 1923, by walking away from a work detail. He was quickly recaptured. As incredible as it may seem, in 1932 Sisson, who had then been in prison for fourteen years, received a pension for his military service from the United States Government.

Sisson died on January 23, 1957, after spending 39 years in prison, a record at the time. His grave is located in the Florence Cemetery, at Florence.

== See also ==
- List of Arizona Wilderness Areas
- List of U.S. Wilderness Areas
