= Galiuro Mountains =

Landform in Arizona, United States and Sonora, Mexico

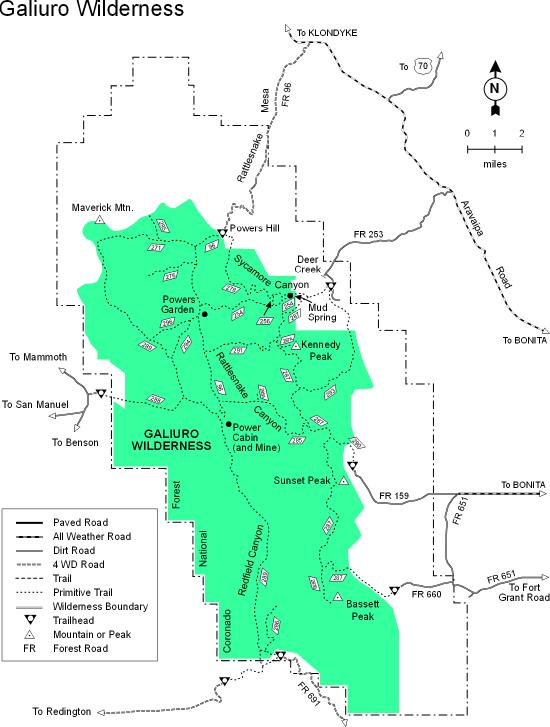
- extensive Galiuro Wilderness at center-south

Highest point
- Peak: Bassett Peak
- Elevation: 7,663 ft (2,336 m)
- Coordinates: 32°30′22″N 110°16′47″W

Dimensions
- Length: 55 mi (89 km) NW-SE
- Width: 15 mi (24 km)

Geography
- Location within Arizona
- Country: United States
- State: Arizona
- Regions: Madrean Sky Islands and Sonoran Desert
- Counties: Graham and Pinal
- Settlements: Mammoth, Klondyke and Redington
- Range coordinates: 32°35′12″N 110°19′48″W
- Borders on: San Pedro River, San Pedro Valley, Aravaipa Valley, Aravaipa Canyon Wilderness, Winchester Mountains and Rincon Mountains
- Topo map: Bassett Peak quad

The Galiuro Mountains are a large sky island mountain range of southeast Arizona, United States. It is a northerly mountain range in the Madrean Sky Islands region of southeast Arizona, northern Sonora in northwestern Mexico, and the extreme southwest (the "bootheel") of New Mexico.

The range is noted for its height and ruggedness. The Aravaipa Canyon Wilderness encompasses the north perimeter of the range, and the large Galiuro Wilderness covers the central-south. To the south, the Galiuro Wilderness borders the Redfield Canyon Wilderness. A river valley borders the range to the southwest, and Aravaipa Creek and Valley border its northeast.

== Range overview ==
The Galiuro Mountains are a northwest–southeast trending range. The moderately wide San Pedro Valley and River border its southwest, abutting the northeast of the large sky island Santa Catalina Mountains range. The more narrow canyon northeast is the Aravaipa Valley with Aravaipa Creek.

Mammoth, Arizona, northeast of Tucson and San Manuel, are the closest communities to the range on its northwest.

=== Peaks and landforms ===
The highest peak of the range is Bassett Peak (Western Apache: Dził Nazaayú´- "Mountain That Sits Here and There") at 7,663 feet (2,336 m). Other peaks from north-to-south: Black Butte at 4,573 feet (1,394 m), Sixtysix Peak, Mescal Peak, Horse Mountain at 6,225 feet (1,897 m), Maverick Mountain at 7,003 feet (2,135 m), China Peak, Topout Peak, Kennedy Peak at 7,549 feet (2,301 m), Sunset Peak, Bassett Peak at 7,663 feet (2,336 m), and Saddle Mountain at 6,167 feet (1,880 m).

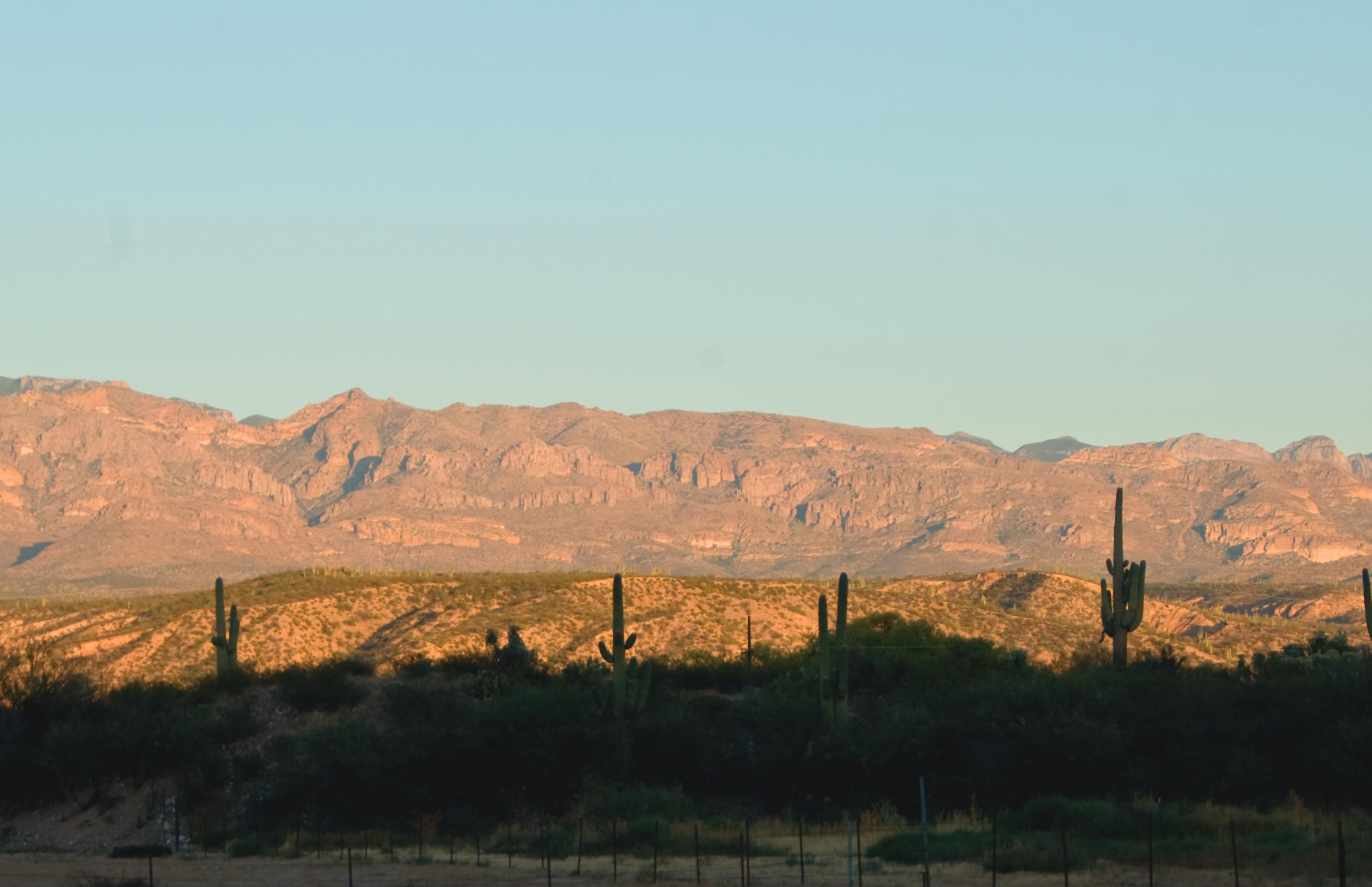
View of the Galiuros from near San Manuel

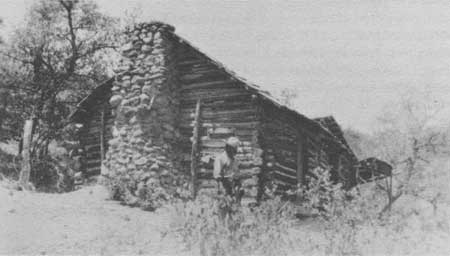
Power's Cabin, the site of the Power's Cabin Shootout in 1918.

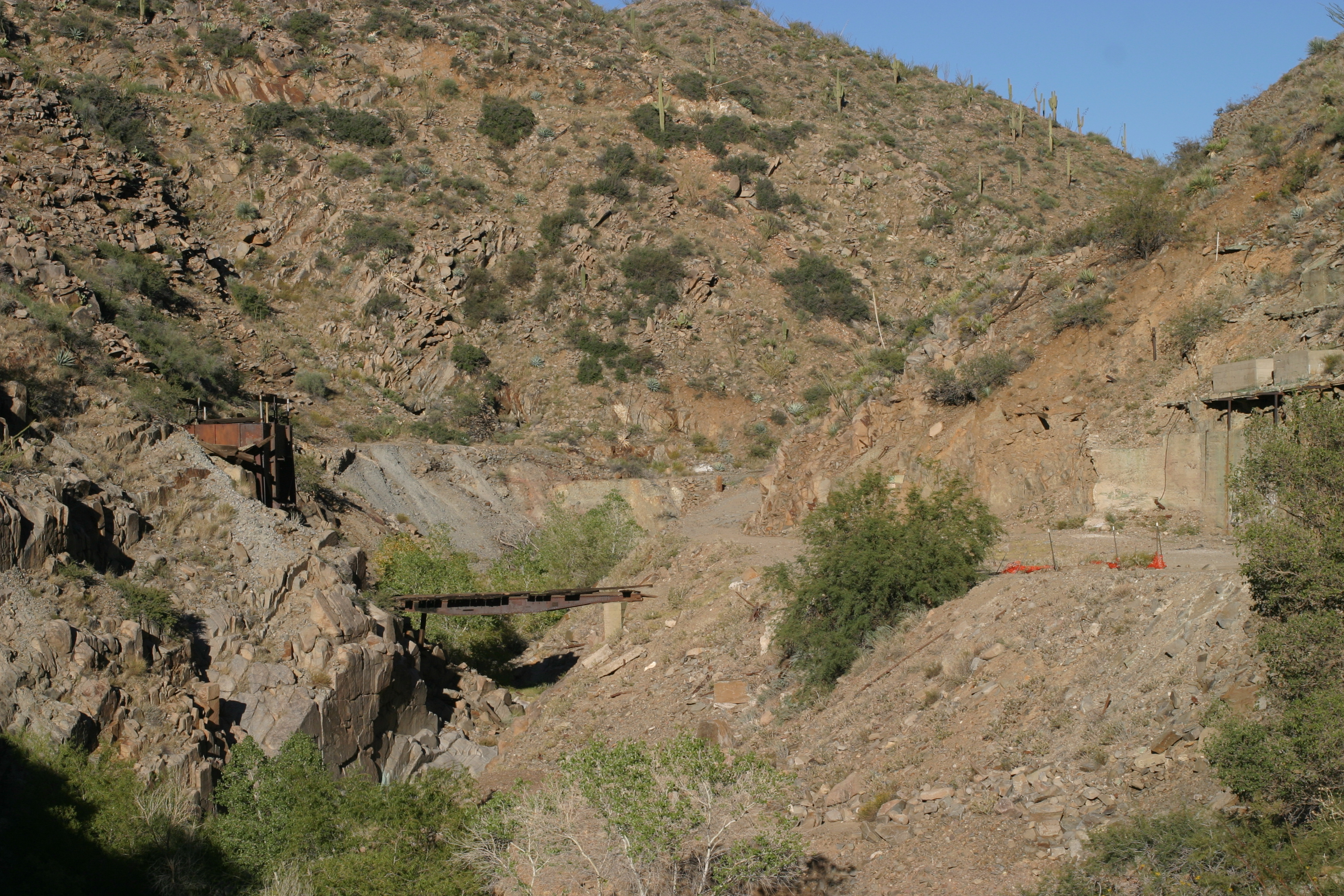
Copper Creek a ghost town in the Galiuro Mountains

== See also ==
- List of mountain ranges of Arizona
