= Neale Publishing Company =

American publisher

The Neale Publishing Company was an American book publisher active between 1894 and 1933. It was a prolific publisher of books about the American Civil War and the Southern United States. Founded by Walter Neale, it published at least 596 titles, 215 were fiction, 279 were non-fiction, and 75 were poetry.

== History ==
The Neale Publishing Company was founded by Walter Neale in 1894. Neale, who had previously worked as a writer, established the company in Washington, D.C. and was one of only two employees. Neale began publishing books in 1896. In 1899 the company published a journal, Conservative Review, but the periodical lasted only two years. It was enough, however, to kick-start the rest of Neale's publishing operation, and forty books were published between 1900 and 1901.

Neale incorporated the company in March 1901. It began to rapidly expand and in 1902 was officially listed in the Publishers Trade List Annual. Sometime in this period, writer Ambrose Bierce wrote a scathing review of one of Neale's publications that extended to the company itself. The book in question quickly sold 6,000 copies as a result of the review and Bierce and Neale became close friends shortly thereafter. The company would go on to publish nearly all of Bierce's future books.

From 1901 onwards, Neale became a prolific publisher books about the American Civil War and the Southern United States in general. Walter Neale was an openly racist and often criticized the policies of the Reconstruction era, however, he regularly published books critical of his own position. By 1910, the Neale Publishing Company had printed more books by Southern writers on the South than any other American publisher. The company offered its authors significant royalties for the time — 20-to-25% of gross sales and 50% of income from republications — and heavily advertised its books, spending more than $50,000 in advertising in the first half of the company's existence (equivalent to $1,791,667 in 2025).

In 1911 the company shut down its Washington, D.C. office and moved all operations to New York City. In 1912, Walter Neale was arrested after sending a threatening letter to one of his authors, Elizabeth Meriwether. Around this time, Neale ventured into publishing periodicals again, with the first issue of Neale's Monthly being published in January 1913. Despite projecting profits in excess of $250,000 (equivalent to $8,143,939 in 2025), the journal only lasted eighteen months and it is unclear if it made any profit.

Beginning in 1915, the company began a gradual decline. It moved locations to a smaller and less expensive building, sold much of its back catalog at a significant discount, and stopped nearly all of its print advertising. In 1919, the company's bindery was destroyed in a fire. No new books were published between 1920 and 1927 as Walter Neale focused his attention on several other business ventures, including two other publishing companies and a supply company. Publications resumed in 1927, culminating in Neale publishing a book of his own in 1929: Life of Ambrose Bierce, a tribute to his friend who had disappeared in 1913. Neale died of heart disease in 1933 and, with his death, the company went defunct.

In 1977, Morningside Press published Neale Books: An Annotated Bibliography by Robert T. Krick, which documented all of the books Neale published over the course of its existence.

== Books ==
The Neale Publishing Company released at least 596 titles between 1894 and 1933. Of those, 215 were fiction, 279 were non-fiction, and 75 were poetry. The company published several books by Ambrose Bierce as well as books by G. Moxley Sorrel, Eugenie Jones-Bacon, Armistead C. Gordon, Robert Hamill Nassau, Charles Massie Long, Henry E. Shepherd, William Estabrook Chancellor, John Wilson Townsend, Cuthbert Lee, Percival Pollard, Katie Daffan, James Havelock Campbell, Charles William Super, Virginia Mason, Elmer Willis Serl, Walter Neale, Mary Newton Stanard, Carl Holliday, Marcus Joseph Wright, William Montgomery Meigs, James Parker, Edwin Du Bois Shurter, Lawrence Wilson, Wilson J. Vance, Wayland Fuller Dunaway, Anne Wilson, John Thompson Gray, Annie L. Sloan, Elizabeth May Montague, Eliza C. Tulloch, Pattie Stone, Roe R. Hobbs, Samuel Jackson Shields, Thomas Lane Carter Jr. and John Goode.

== Publishings ==
- Selected Poems of Henry Ames Blood (1901) by Henry Ames Blood
- A Memoir of Robert M. T. Hunter (1903) by Martha T. Hunter
- Haiti: Her History and Her Detractors (1907) by Jacques Nicolas Léger
- My Life and My Lectures (1908) by Lamar Fontaine
- The Red Moon (1910) by Mrs. Eugenie Jones-Bacon
- The Devil's Dictionary (1911) by Ambrose Bierce
- Fighting by Southern Federals (1912) by Charles Anderson
- The Facts of Reconstruction (1913) by John R. Lynch
- The Valley Campaigns (1914) by Thomas Ashby
- Recollections of a California Pioneer (1917) by Carlisle S. Abbott
- Below the James: A Plantation Sketch (1918) by William Cabell Bruce
- Life of Ambrose Bierce (1929) by Walter Neale
- The Carolinians: An Old-Fashioned Love Story of Stirring Times in the Early Colony of Carolina by Annie L. Sloan
