= 1901 in literature =

This article contains information about the literary events and publications of 1901.

== Events ==
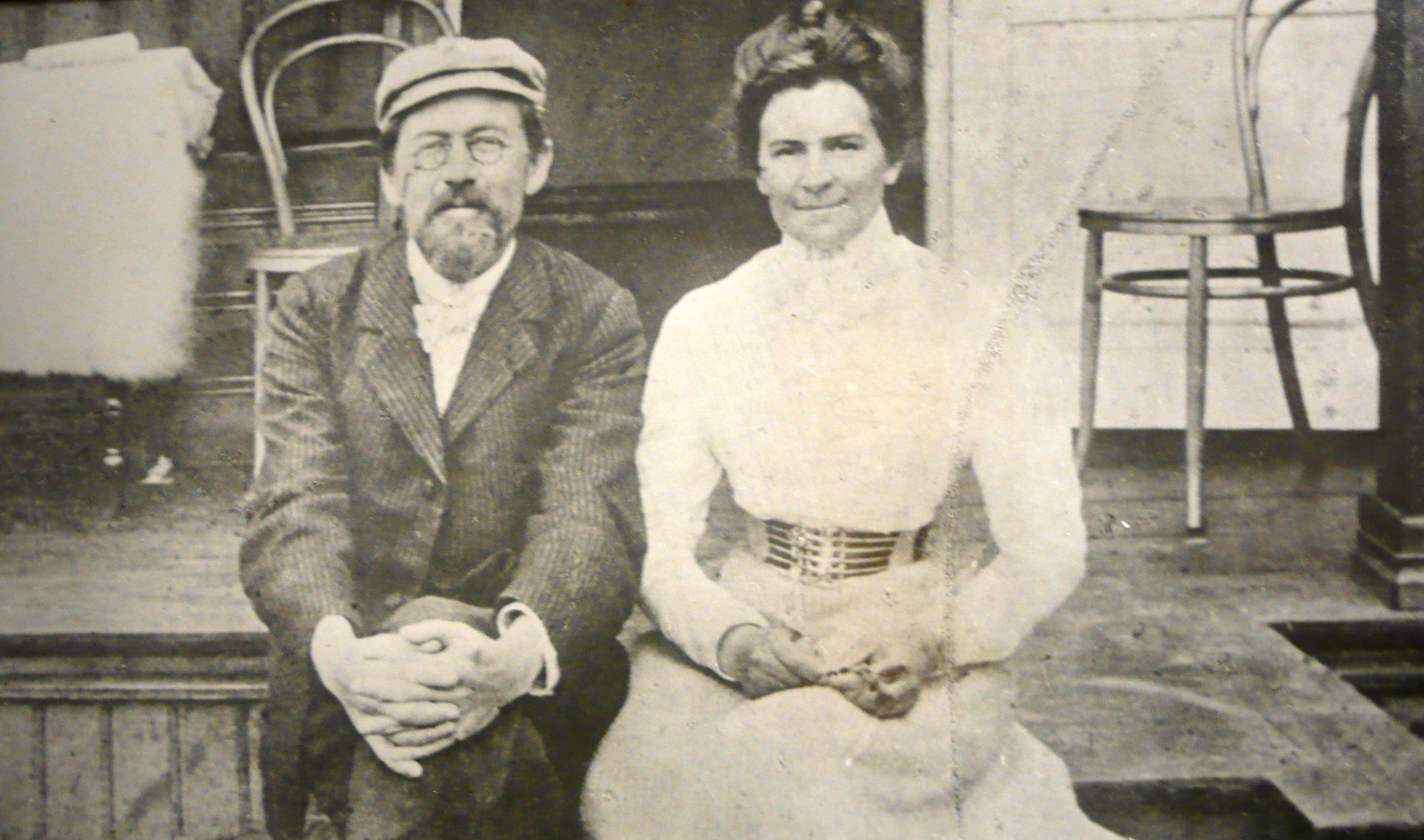
Anton Chekhov with Olga Knipper, on their honeymoon

- January 31 – Anton Chekhov's Three Sisters (Три сeстры, Tri sestry) opens at the Moscow Art Theatre, directed by Constantin Stanislavski and Vladimir Nemirovich-Danchenko with Stanislavski as Vershinin, Olga Knipper as Masha, Margarita Savetskaya as Olga, Maria Andreyeva as Irina, and Maria Lilina (Stanislavski's wife) as Natasha.
- February 22 – Leo Tolstoy is excommunicated from the Russian Orthodox Church.
- May 1 – Publication of Maurice Maeterlinck's The Life of the Bee in Belgium.
- May 6 – Swedish dramatist August Strindberg, 52, marries his third wife, the Swedish-Norwegian actress Harriet Bosse, 23, after an engagement in March during rehearsals for his play Easter (Påsk).
- May 25 – Chekhov marries Olga Knipper in a quiet ceremony.
- May 28 – Cherry v. Des Moines Leader is decided in the Iowa Supreme Court, upholding the right to publish critical reviews.
- June 28 – G. K. Chesterton marries Frances Blogg at St Mary Abbots, Kensington.
- July – The first modern performances of Everyman, the 15th-century morality play, are given by William Poel's Elizabethan Stage Society outdoors at the Charterhouse in London.
- July 24 – O. Henry is released from prison in Columbus, Ohio after serving three years for embezzlement.
- October
  - Thomas Mann's first novel, Buddenbrooks, is published in Berlin.
  - The Irish Literary Theatre project gives its final performance.
- October 23 – Mark Twain receives an honorary doctorate of literature from Yale University. In the same month he moves to Riverdale, New York.
- November 16 – Greek language question: The Oresteia riots in Athens by supporters of Katharevousa protesting against a performance of the Oresteia in Demotic Greek culminate in two protesters being killed.
- December 2 – The Romanian literary review Sămănătorul is founded.
- December 10 – The first Nobel Prize in Literature is awarded, to French poet Sully Prudhomme.
- unknown date – World's Classics series of publications is founded by Grant Richards in England.

== New books ==
=== Fiction ===
- Ignacio Manuel Altamirano – El Zarco
- Leonid Andreyev – «повести» (stories)
- E. F. Benson – The Luck of the Vails
- René Boylesve – La Becquée
- Samuel Butler – Erewhon Revisited
- Hall Caine – The Eternal City
- Winston Churchill – The Crisis
- Colette – Claudine à Paris
- Joseph Conrad and Ford Madox Ford – The Inheritors
- Victoria Cross – Anna Lombard
- Patrick S. Dinneen – Cormac Ó Conaill (first novel in Irish published complete in book form)
- George Douglas – The House with the Green Shutters
- Miles Franklin – My Brilliant Career
- Géza Gárdonyi – A láthatatlan ember (The Invisible Man)
- George Griffith – A Honeymoon in Space
- Henry James – The Sacred Fount
- Johannes V. Jensen – The Fall of the King
- Rudyard Kipling – Kim
- Jean Lorrain
  - Monsieur de Phocas
  - Le Vice errant
- George Barr McCutcheon – Graustark: The Story of a Love Behind a Throne
- Thomas Mann – Buddenbrooks
- George Moore – Sister Theresa
- Frank Norris – The Octopus
- Charles-Louis Philippe – Bubu de Montparnasse
- Luigi Pirandello – The Outcast (L'Esclusa)
- Liane de Pougy – Idylle Saphique
- José Maria de Eça de Queiroz – A Cidade e as Serras
- Alice Hegan Rice – Mrs. Wiggs of the Cabbage Patch
- M. P. Shiel
  - Lord of the Sea
  - The Purple Cloud
- Bram Stoker and Valdimar Ásmundsson – Makt Myrkranna (Powers of Darkness, Icelandic language adaptation of Stoker's Dracula)
- Rabindranath Tagore – Nastanirh (নষ্টনীড়, The Broken Nest)
- William Alexander Taylor – Intermere
- Anthony E. Wills – Monsieur Paul De Fere
- Jules Verne
  - The Sea Serpent (Les Histoires de Jean-Marie Cabidoulin)
  - The Village in the Treetops (Le Village aérien)
- H. G. Wells – The First Men in the Moon
- Émile Zola – Travail

=== Children and young people ===
- John Kendrick Bangs – Mr. Munchausen
- L. Frank Baum
  - American Fairy Tales
  - The Master Key
  - Dot and Tot of Merryland
- Evelyn Everett-Green – True Stories of Girl Heroines
- Mary Catherine Judd, illustrated by Angel De Cora – Wigwam stories

=== Drama ===
- Gabriele D'Annunzio – Francesca da Rimini
- J. M. Barrie – Quality Street
- Roberto Bracco – Lost in the Dark (Sperduti nel buio)
- Hall Caine – The Eternal City
- Anton Chekhov – Three Sisters
- Clyde Fitch – The Climbers
- Haralamb Lecca – Quinta. Suprema forță
- Wilhelm Meyer-Förster – Old Heidelberg (Alt Heidelberg)
- Louis N. Parker – The Cardinal
- August Strindberg – A Dream Play (Ett drömspel, published)
- Stanisław Wyspiański
  - Warszawianka (Varsovian Anthem, stage première)
  - The Wedding (Wesele)

=== Poetry ===
- Henry Ames Blood – Selected Poems of Henry Ames Blood
- Maxim Gorky – The Song of the Stormy Petrel (Песня о Буревестнике)
- Thomas Hardy – Poems of the Past and the Present
- Akiko Yosano (与謝野 晶子) – Midaregami (みだれ髪, Tangled Hair)

=== Non-fiction ===
- Annie Besant, Charles Webster Leadbeater – Thought-Forms: A Record of Clairvoyant Investigation
- Sigmund Freud – The Psychopathology of Everyday Life (Zur Psychopathologie des Alltagslebens)
- Francis Procter and Walter Frere – A New History of the Book of Common Prayer
- Seebohm Rowntree – Poverty, A Study of Town Life
- Edith Helen Sichel – Women and Men of the French Renaissance
- Rudolf Steiner – Die Mystik im Aufgange des neuzeitlichen Geisteslebens, und ihr Verhältnis zur modernen Weltan-schauung (Mysticism at the Dawn of Modern Spiritual Life, and its Relationship with Modern World-views)
- A. E. Waite – The Life of Louis Claude de Saint-Martin
- Booker T. Washington – Up from Slavery
- H. G. Wells – Anticipations of the Reaction of Mechanical and Scientific Progress Upon Human Life and Thought

== Births ==
- January 1 – Elisabeth Kyle, Scottish novelist and journalist (died 1982)
- January 17 – Hryhorii Epik, Ukrainian writer and journalist (shot with many other Ukrainian intellectuals at Sandarmokh 1937)
- January 30 – Hans Erich Nossack, German poet, playwright, novelist and short story writer (died 1977)
- January 31 – Marie Luise Kaschnitz (Marie Luise von Holzing-Berslett), German story writer, novelist and poet (died 1974)
- February 1 – Langston Hughes, African-American poet and novelist (died 1967)
- February 2 – Valerian Pidmohylny, Ukrainian modernist (shot at Sandarmokh 1937)
- February 3 – Rosamond Lehmann, English novelist (died 1990)
- February 13 – Lewis Grassic Gibbon (James Leslie Mitchell), Scottish novelist (died 1935)
- February 23 – Ivar Lo-Johansson, Swedish novelist and journalist (died 1990)
- March 4 (or 1903) – Jean-Joseph Rabearivelo (Joseph-Casimir Rabearivelo), Malagasy Francophone poet (suicide 1937)
- April 10 – Anna Kavan (Helen Emily Woods, Helen Ferguson), French-born English novelist and short story writer (died 1968)
- April 21 – Gladys Mitchell, English crime fiction writer (died 1983)
- May 1 – Antal Szerb, Hungarian writer (died 1945)
- May 2 – Margaret Wetherby Williams (Margaret Erskine), English crime fiction writer (died 1984)
- May 15 – Xavier Herbert, Australian novelist (died 1984)
- May 26 – Norman Denny, English writer and translator (died 1982)
- June 1 – John Van Druten, English-born American dramatist (died 1957)
- June 23 – Ahmet Hamdi Tanpınar, Turkish novelist and essayist (died 1962)
- July 9 – Barbara Cartland, English romantic novelist, historian and playwright (died 2000)
- July 20 – Dilys Powell, English film critic (died 1995)
- July 25 – Ruth Krauss, American children's author and poet (died 1993)
- August 10 – Sergio Frusoni, Cape Verde poet and promoter of Cape Verdean Creole language (died 1975)
- August 14 – Alice Rivaz, Swiss writer (died 1998)
- August 17 – Heðin Brú, Faroese fiction writer and translator (died 1987)
- August 20 – Salvatore Quasimodo, Italian poet and translator (died 1968)
- October 25 – Samuil Lehtțir, Soviet Moldovan poet, critic and literary theorist (shot 1937)
- November 3 – André Malraux, French author (died 1976)
- November 4 – Ernest Elmore (John Bude), English crime writer and theatre director (died 1957)
- December 9 – Ödön von Horváth, Austro-Hungarian dramatist and novelist (died 1938)
- December 16 – Margaret Mead, American anthropologist and author (died 1978)

== Deaths ==
- January 1 – Ignatius L. Donnelly, American politician and writer (born 1831)
- January 14 – Víctor Balaguer, Catalan Spanish dramatist and poet (born 1824)
- January 17 – Frederic W. H. Myers, British poet (born 1843)
- January 26 – Grigore Sturdza, Moldavian and Romanian adventurer, literary sponsor and philosopher (pneumonia, born 1821)
- February 2 – John Cordy Jeaffreson, English novelist and non-fiction writer (born 1831)
- February 7 – Rowena Granice Steele, first female novelist in California (born 1824)
- February 15 – Maurice Thompson, American novelist (born 1844)
- February 18 – Anna Gardner, American author, abolitionist, teacher, reformer (born 1816)
- March 19 – Philippe Gille, French dramatist (born 1831)
- April 6 – George Murray Smith, English publisher (born 1824)
- April 10 — Harriet Newell Kneeland Goff, reformer and author (born 1828)
- April 12 – Louis Auguste Sabatier, French theologian (born 1839)
- April 26 – Harriett Ellen Grannis Arey, American educator, author, editor, and publisher (born 1819)
- May 24 – Charlotte Mary Yonge, English novelist (born 1823)
- June 4 – Charlotte Fowler Wells, American phrenologist and publisher (born 1814)
- June 5 – Dagny Juel, Norwegian writer and artists' model (shot, born 1867)
- June 9 – Walter Besant, English novelist and historian (born 1836)
- June 10 – Robert Williams Buchanan, Scottish poet, novelist and dramatist (born 1841)
- July 7 – Johanna Spyri, Swiss children's writer (born 1827)
- July 18 – Jan ten Brink, Dutch novelist (born 1834)
- July 20 – William Cosmo Monkhouse, English poet and critic (born 1840)
- July 27 – Brooke Foss Westcott, English theologian (born 1825)
- August 4 – Harriet Pritchard Arnold, American author (born 1858)
- August 9 – Vishnudas Bhave, Indian dramatist (unknown birth year)
- October 24 – Edward M. Alfriend, American playwright, novelist, and businessman (born 1837)
- October 28 – Paul Rée, German author and philosopher (born 1849)
- October 31 – Julien Leclercq, French Symbolist poet and art critic (born 1865)
- November 6 – Kate Greenaway, English children's illustrator and writer (born 1846)
- November 21 – V. A. Urechia, Romanian historian, writer and politician (born 1834)
- December 28 – Mary K. Buck, Bohemian-born American author (born 1849)

== Awards ==
- Nobel Prize for Literature: Sully Prudhomme
