= Daffan =

Daffan is a surname. Notable people with the surname include:

- Katie Daffan (1874–1951), American author
- Ted Daffan (1912–1996), American country musician
