= Anyentyuwe =

Mpongwe teacher, feminist and missionary nurse (c. 1855–1904)

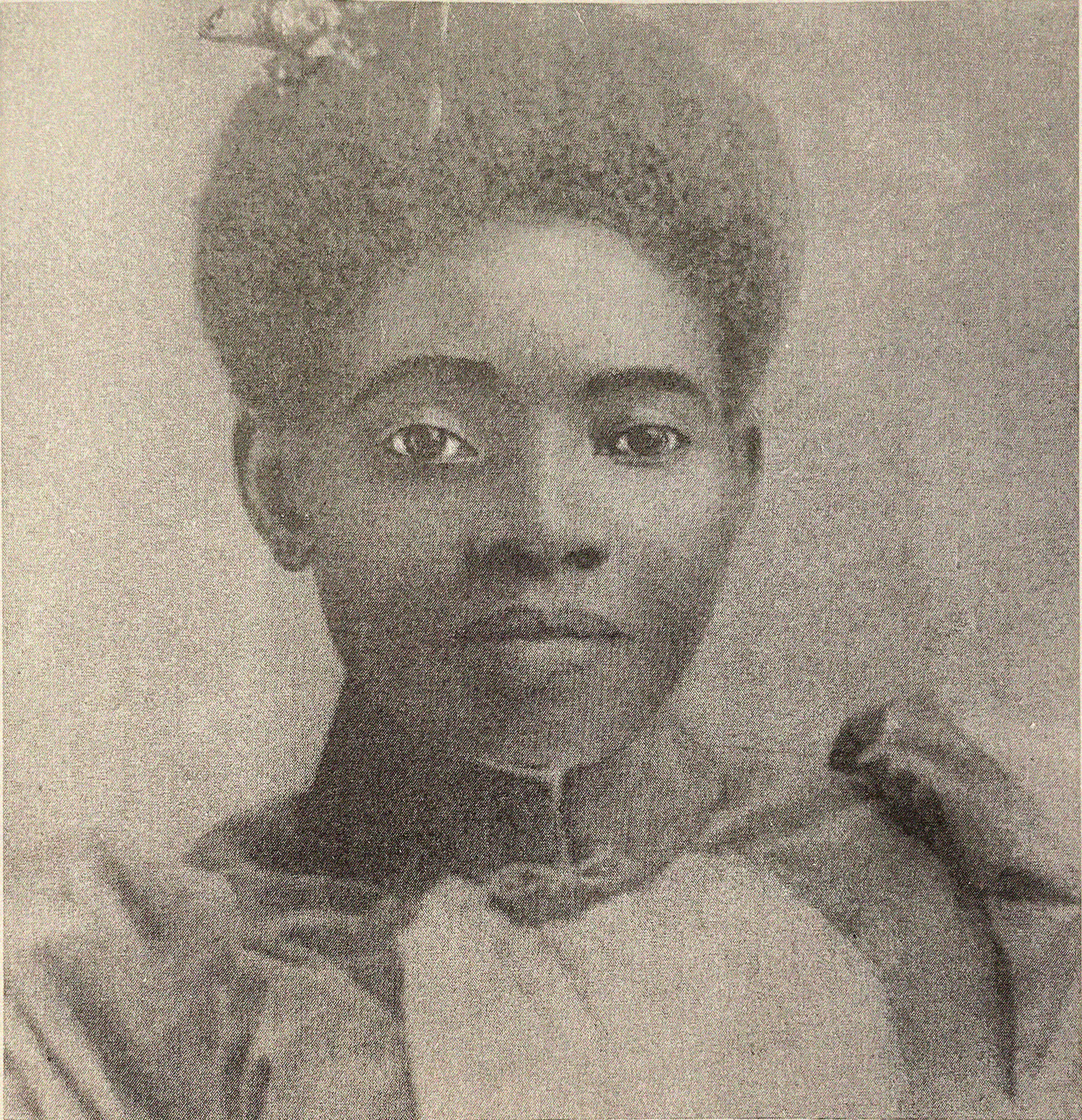
Anyentyuwe (c. 1885)

Anyentyuwe (c. 1855–1904), also known by her English name Janie Harrington, was a Mpongwe teacher, feminist and missionary nurse. Daughter to prominent, educated parents (her father was chief missionary leader and trader Sonie "John" Harrington), she was raised on the Gabonese coast of Africa, in the French occupied territory of Libreville, Gabon. Anyentyuwe traveled some, but spent the majority of her adult life within this area, teaching and doing missionary work. She was an outspoken advocate for women, against the double standard of expectations between men and women.

== Education ==
Anyentyuwe was known as her father, Sonie's, favorite of his many children, and he took great care in raising her to be virtuous and moral. Because Anyentyuwe's mother died when she was very young and her father's work kept him traveling, Sonie placed her in the care of Mrs. Bushnell at the Mission at Baraka, a nearby American-run Protestant school. When Anyentyuwe was thirteen, her father died and Mrs. Bushnell became her primary caregiver. Mrs. Bushnell took education very seriously and personally oversaw Anyentyuwe's studies. As a result, Anyentyuwe's education covered a wider array of topics than her peers, including studies of history, Physiology, Composition and Math.

== Work ==
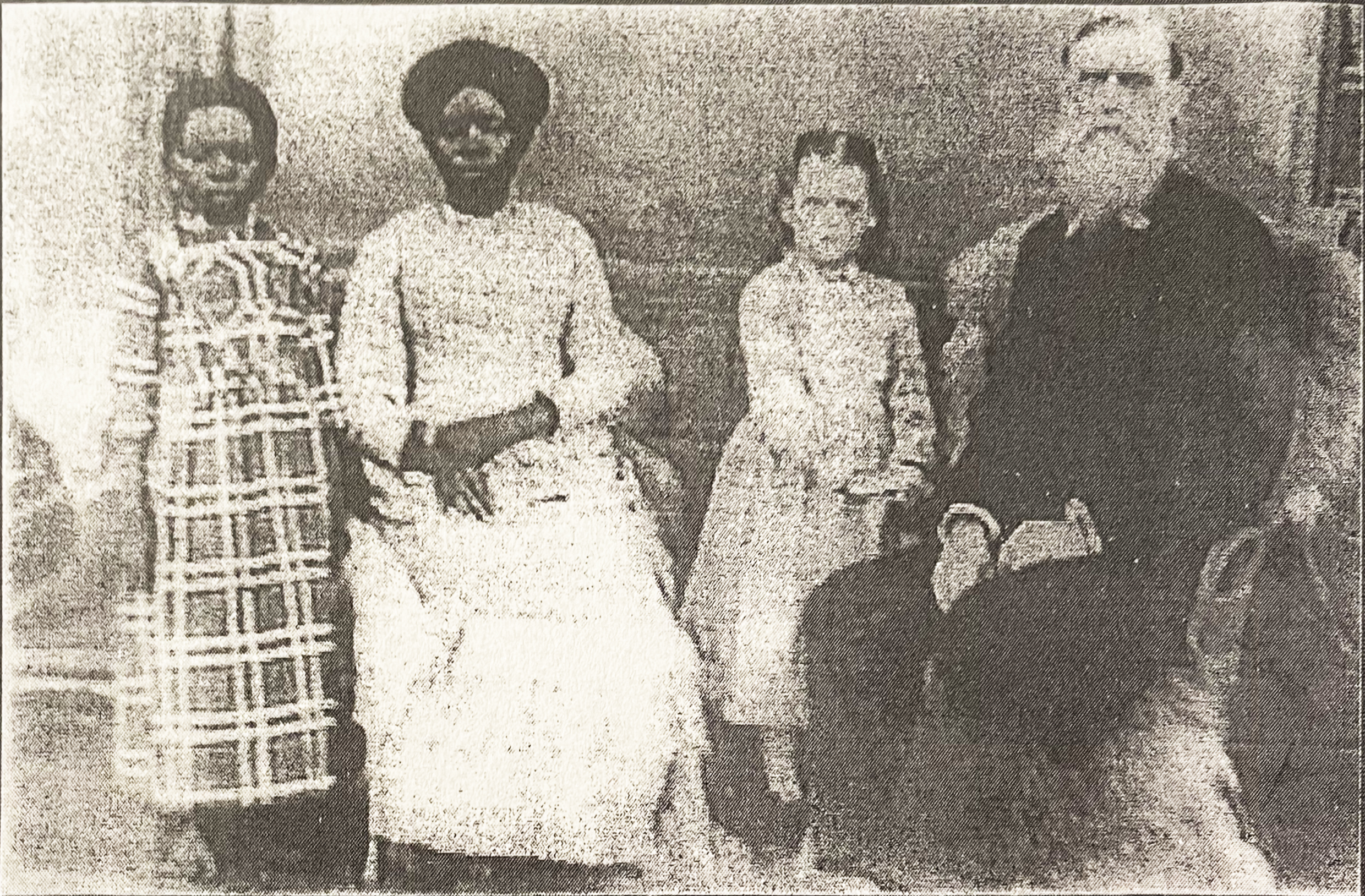
Anyentyuwe and Dr. Nassau with daughters (c. 1890)

When Anyentyuwe completed her studies in the 1870s, she honored a promise she'd made to her father and began teaching at the Mission School. Before her father's death, he asked her to maintain her virtue and remain with the missionaries; Anyentyuwe took this promise seriously. She worked at the Mission School for many years, despite low wages, rationed food, and frequent mistreated by the male, American missionaries.

Her teaching career came to an abrupt end, after she reported being sexually assaulted by two missionaries at the Mission School. Not only were her accusations disregarded, Anyentyuwe was banished from the only place she'd called home.

By the 1890s, Anyentyuwe worked as a personal nanny to the child of a renowned missionary doctor, Robert Hamill Nassau. They developed a deep friendship and Anyentyuwe shared details about Gabonese spiritual practices and the early days of the Protestant mission in Gabon. She became a collaborator and contributor for Dr. Nassau's books, Fetichism in West Africa and Tales out of School.

== Personal life ==
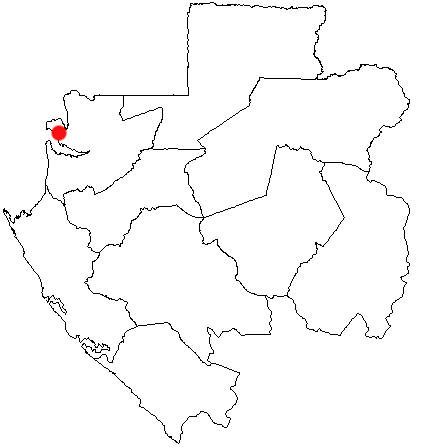
Libreville, Gabon

In 1882, Anyentyuwe gave birth to a daughter, Iga. This pregnancy was the result of one of her sexual assaults. Despite admirers, she never married. Anyentyuwe enjoyed the companionship and professional relationship she shared with her longtime friend and former employer, Robert Hamill Nassau, but maintained that they never had any romantic ties.

== Feminism ==
Throughout Anyentyuwe's time at the Mission School, she was challenged by the male missionaries. She was constantly required to "prove" her chasteness, and frequently spoke out about the misogynistic views on women's clothing and behavior she witnessed. It was uncommon for women to report harassment or assault in colonial Africa; despite Anyentyuwe's assault never being prosecuted, merely reporting it caused controversy. While working with Nassau, their relationship was under constant scrutiny within the Protestant community, despite their continued assurance that they were close friends and professional colleagues; her outspoken denial of these accusations of sexual impropriety caused strife and led to her developing a rebellious reputation.
