= Royal Emerson Whitman =

United States Army officer (1833–1913)

- Royal Emerson Whitman, from his monument at Arlington National Cemetery.
- Born: May 11, 1833; Turner, Maine
- Died: February 12, 1913 (aged 79); Washington, D.C.
- Burial place: Arlington National Cemetery, Arlington County, Virginia
- Military career
- Allegiance: US
- Branch: United States Army; Union Army
- Service years: 1862–65, 1867–79
- Rank: Colonel, USV; First Lieutenant, USA

Colonel Royal Emerson Whitman (May 11, 1833 – February 12, 1913), was an American army officer who served in the Civil War, Reconstruction, and the Indian wars, best known for his association with the 1871 Camp Grant massacre. He was the father of noted orthopedic surgeon Royal Whitman.

== Early life ==
Royal Emerson Whitman was born May 11, 1833, at Turner, Maine, the son of Royal and Sally (Bradford) Whitman. Prior to his military career, he was a saddle manufacturer. He married, December 1, 1852, Lucretia Octavia Whitman, who was born in Maine in 1830. She was a member of another branch of the same family. The couple resided in Portland and Turner, Maine, and had six children: Alice, Alphonso, Royal, William Ross, Henry Hyde, and May. They were divorced in January 1876, in Androscoggin, Maine.

== Military career prior to the Camp Grant massacre ==
Whitman was appointed sergeant major of the 23rd Maine Volunteer Infantry on September 20, 1862, and promoted to captain March 1, 1863. He was honorably mustered out of the volunteer service on July 15, 1863. He rejoined the service as major of the 30th Maine Volunteer Infantry on December 29, 1863, and was promoted successively to lieutenant colonel on 1 September 1, 1864, and to colonel on 14 August 14, 1865. He was honorably mustered out of the volunteer service on August 20, 1865. He joined the 3rd U. S. Cavalry as second lieutenant on July 2, 1867, with a brevet rank of first lieutenant, United States Army, for gallantry during his previous service in the Battle of Sabine Crossroads, April 8, 1864; regular promotion to the rank of first lieutenant followed on August 12, 1869. Whitman retired from the army March 20, 1879.

== Whitman and the Camp Grant massacre ==
Whitman was a 37-year-old first lieutenant when he assumed command of Camp Grant at the confluence of the San Pedro River and Aravaipa Creek about 50 miles (80 km) northeast of Tucson. The area had previously been home to the Aravaipa Apaches before they had been driven from it by American settlers.

In February 1871, five old Apache women straggled into Camp Grant to look for a son who had been taken prisoner. Whitman fed them and treated them kindly, so other Apaches from Aravaipa and Pinal bands soon came to the post to receive rations of beef and flour. Whitman also arranged for them to "earn their keep" by working as farmhands for the local ranchers as well as extracting a promise from them that none of the tribe would participate in any raids. That spring, Whitman created a refuge along Aravaipa Creek about five miles (8 km) east of Camp Grant for nearly 500 Aravaipa and Pinal Apaches, including Chief Eskiminzin.

Whitman may have suspected that peace could not last. Other Apache bands were continuing their raids at this time, many of which were blamed on the Aravaipa at Camp Grant. He urged Eskiminzin to move his people to the White Mountains near Fort Apache, which was established in 1870, but he refused.

On April 30, 1871, an angry mob of citizens from Tucson and their O'odham mercenaries attacked the Aravaipa camp, killing 144 people. All but eight of the corpses were women and children, as the men had been off hunting in the mountains. The attack was made in retaliation for a Gila Apache raid in which six people had been killed and some livestock stolen. Twenty-seven children who were captured, were sold in Mexico by the O'odham.

Lieutenant Whitman searched for the wounded, found only one woman, buried the bodies, and dispatched interpreters into the mountains to find the Apache men and assure them that his soldiers had not participated in the "vile transaction." The following evening, the surviving Aravaipas began trickling back to Camp Grant. Many of the settlers in southern Arizona considered the attack justifiable homicide.

Within a week of the slaughter, a local Anglo businessman/merchant named William Hopkins Tonge (or Touge) wrote to the Commissioner of Indian Affairs stating, "The Indians at the time of the massacre being so taken by surprise and considering themselves perfectly safe with scarcely any arms, those that could get away ran for the mountains." He was the first person to refer to what had taken place as a massacre.

After the massacre, a trial was demanded by President Ulysses S. Grant, who threatened to put the state under martial law if the governor failed to act. However, at the trial that occurred later in the year, the jury took just 19 minutes to acquit more than 100 defendants who were named in the attack.

== Later life ==
Whitman retired from the army March 20, 1879. In later life he lived in Washington, DC. There, on February 11, 1902, in her home at 1449 Massachusetts Avenue, he married Mary Miller Blood, daughter of Col. Ephraim F. and Catherine (Seymour) Miller and widow of poet Henry Ames Blood. On August 7, 1905, during a visit by the Whitmans to Portland, Maine, Mary was stricken with apoplexy, dying peacefully on August 8. Her funeral was held August 10 in New Ipswich, New Hampshire. Mary made large bequests in memory of her first husband and son by her first marriage, which were to be paid after the death of Col. Whitman. Whitman died at the age of 79 on February 12, 1913, at his residence, in Washington, DC. His funeral was held February 14, 1913, at his late residence. He was buried at Arlington National Cemetery.
