= Fetichism in West Africa =

1904 book by Robert Hamill Nassau

Fetichism in West Africa: Forty Years' Observation of Native Customs and Superstitions
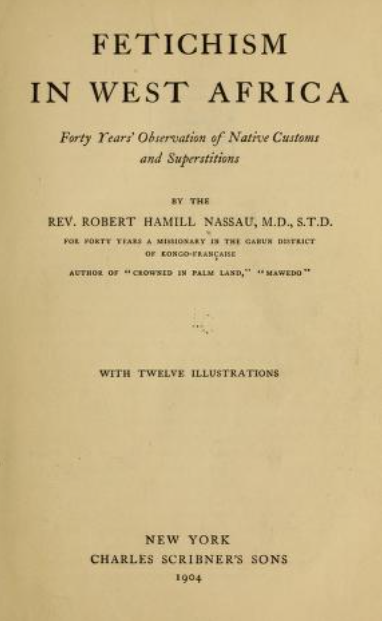
- Title page for Fetichism in West Africa: Forty Years' Observation of Native Customs and Superstitions (1904)
- Author: Robert Hamill Nassau
- Language: English
- Subject: West African traditional religion
- Genre: Non-fiction
- Publication date: 1904

Fetichism in West Africa: Forty Years' Observation of Native Customs and Superstitions is a book by the Reverend Robert Hamill Nassau, a missionary, published in 1904. It is one of the earliest studies of traditional religion on West Africa.

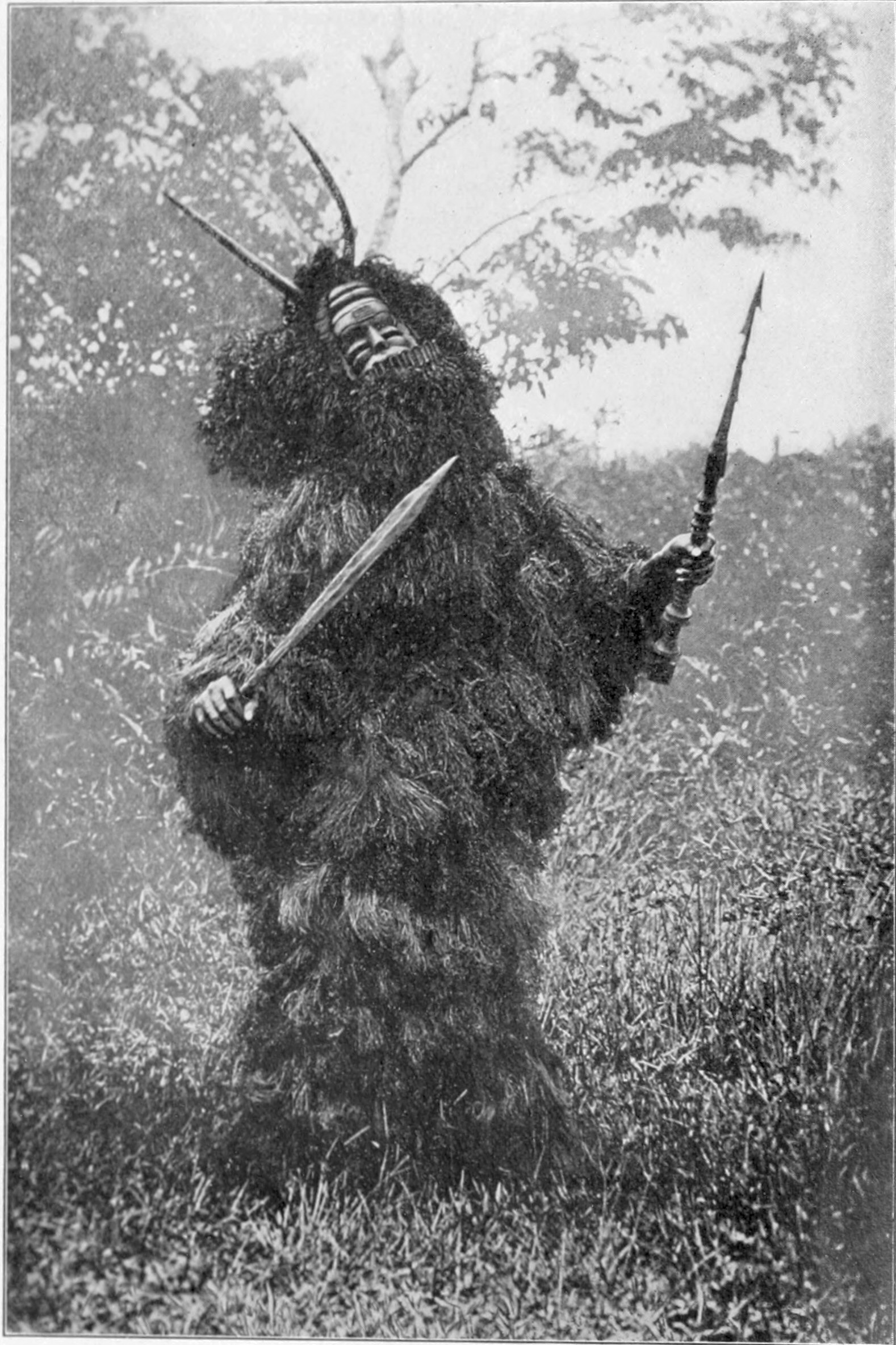
Fetich Magician with horns, wooden mask, spear, and sword, dress of leaves of palm and plantain. Frontispiece from Fetichism in West Africa: Forty Years' Observations of Native Customs and Superstitions.

The book relates the facts which Nassau claims to have discovered over the course of many years concerning traditional religions and the practice of sorcery in West Africa and how it related to the everyday lives of the people of that region. John Cinnamon suggests that 'when Nassau was able to refrain from the constant, invidious comparison between enlightened Christian truth and degraded African wickedness, his observations contain glimmers of ethnographic insight'.

A Mpongwe woman, Anyentyuwe, was one of Nassau's principal informants for Fetichism in West Africa. She was a teacher and servant at Baraka Mission, Gabon.

== See also ==
- Fetishism – Human attribution of special powers or value to an object
