= Haiti: Her History and Her Detractors =

1907 book by Jacques Nicolas Léger

Haiti: Her History and Her Detractors is a non-fiction book by Jacques Nicolas Léger about Haiti. It was published in 1907 by The Neale Publishing Company.

== Content ==
The book discusses the history, politics, and people of Haiti and refutes perceived misconceptions about Haiti held by Americans. The first part of the book provides an overview of Haitian history from its colonization by the Spanish, the Haitian Revolution, and the presidency of Jean-Pierre Boyer. The second part presents a series of misconceptions about Haitian culture and responds to them.

== Development history ==
Léger wrote the book while serving as Haiti's Envoy Extraordinary and Minister Plenipotentiary to the United States. While promoting the book, he remarked that it was written to promote "mutual respect and esteem" between the two nations. It was published by The Neale Publishing Company in 1907. A French-language edition was published by Neale at the same time as the English-language edition.

== Reception ==
The book was positively received upon release. The Brooklyn Daily Eagle described Léger as having made "an able vindication of his country" and The Los Angeles Times noted that it revealed a side of Haiti often undiscussed in American circles. The Washington Post and The Boston Globe both recommended the book, praising Léger for his prose and even-handed approach to Haitian history. A review in The Evening Star described the book as an achievement for Haiti, writing that "never was the story of a struggling and suffering people so plainly told; never was such a story more interesting and effective in the telling." In a review more emblematic of the time period of the book's publication, the Hartford Courant wrote that the book proved that "the negro or mixed race" was capable of self-governance.
