= Recollections of a California Pioneer =

1917 memoir by Carlisle S. Abbot

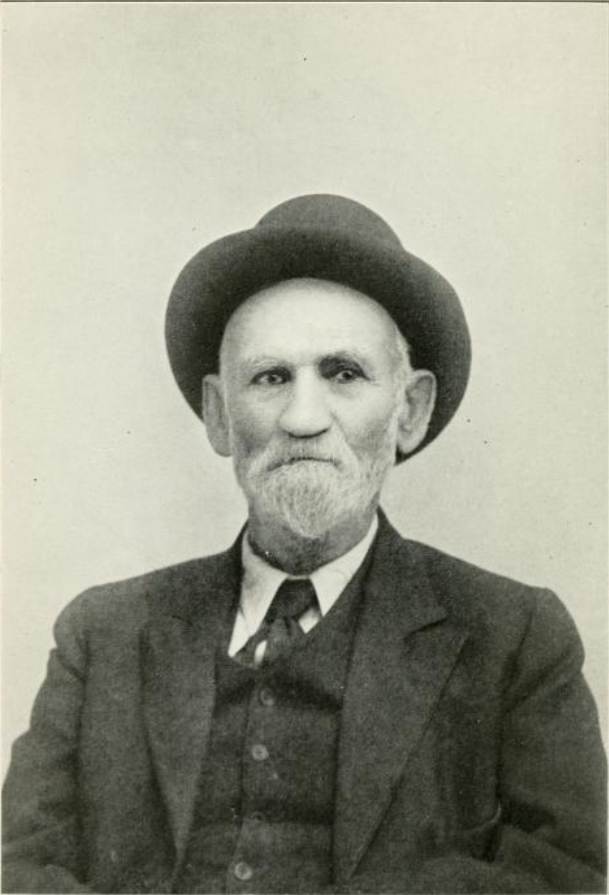
- Frontispiece
- Author: Carlisle S. Abbott
- Language: English
- Subject: Oregon Trail, Politics
- Genre: Novel
- Set in: California
- Publisher: Neale Publishing Company
- Publication date: 1917
- Publication place: United States
- Pages: 235

Recollections of a California Pioneer is a memoir by Carlisle S. Abbott. It was published by The Neale Publishing Company in 1917. The book details Abbott's life and journey along the Oregon Trail to California, along with some discussion of his life in California and the early politics of Salinas Valley.

== Biography ==
Born in Canada in 1828, Abbott ran away from home as a teenage, traveled across the Great Plains twice, worked as a miner, and lived alongside the Apache people for a time. He was a member of the first recorded crossing of the Hastings Cutoff in 1850. Abbotts Lagoon in the Point Reyes National Seashore is named after him.

Abbott raised dairy cattle and established a narrow gauge railroad. He also established the Abbott House, that later became the Cominos Hotel, and served as a member of the California Assembly from 1876 to 1879.

== Reception ==
The book received an initial print run of 10,000 copies on June 1, 1917. Abbott was 89 or 90 years old when it was published. It received mildly positive reception upon its release. The Brooklyn Daily Eagle described Abbott's writing as "charming" and The Boston Globe called it an "authentic record." A review by Frances Fort Brown in The Chattanooga News called Abbott's writing "young in spirit" and recommended it as a "valuable historical work."

Charles Kelly noted in the Utah Historical Quarterly that Abbott's memoir is the only existing account that discusses the journey through the Hastings Cutoff humorously and is the only account that mentions any thievery along the route. Robert Krick, in a retrospective on the Neale Publishing Company, described the book as "more entertaining than reliable."
