= Camp Grant massacre =

1871 massacre of Pinal and Aravaipa Apaches

Coordinates: 32.848305°N 110.704654°W

Camp Grant Massacre
- Part of the American and Mexican Indian Wars
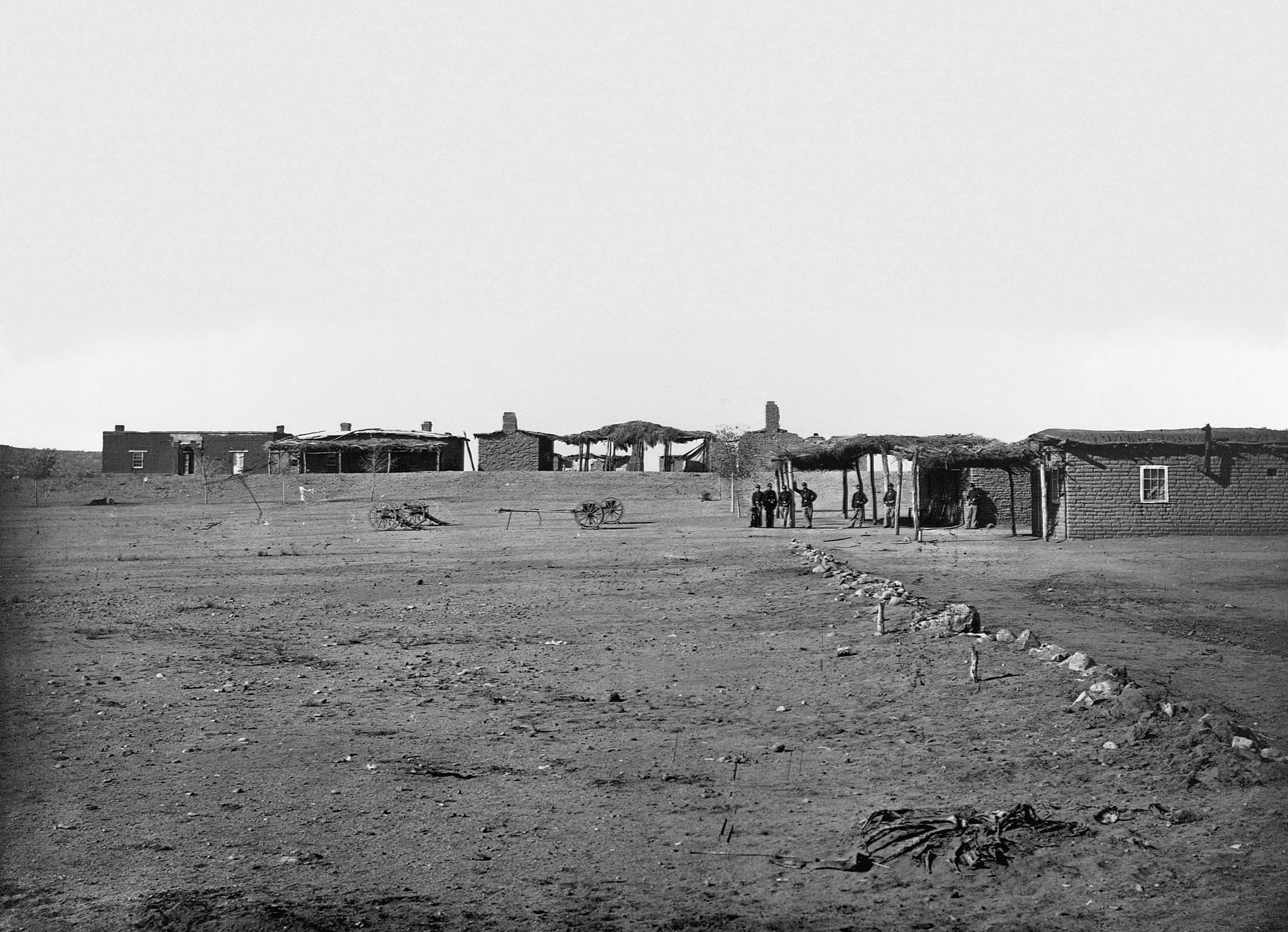
- Camp Grant, photographed by John Karl Hillers in 1870
- Location: near Camp Grant, Arizona Territory
- Date: April 30, 1871
- Attack type: Mass murder
- Deaths: 144
- Perpetrators: O'odham warriors, Mexican and American civilians

The Camp Grant massacre, on April 30, 1871, was an attack on Pinal and Aravaipa Apaches who surrendered to the United States Army at Camp Grant, Arizona, along the San Pedro River. The massacre led to a series of battles and campaigns fought between the Americans, the Apache, and their Yavapai allies, which continued into 1875, the most notable being General George Crook's Tonto Basin Campaign of 1872 and 1873.

== Background ==
Some historians felt the reduction of Indian hostilities in the region had triggered fears of economic crisis in Tucson, since the federal government was reducing funds for pacifying and controlling hostile tribes, mostly Apaches. Merchants who survived on the "blankets for peace" economy were afraid their source of income would soon be lost. In early 1871, to bolster public support for increased hostilities and increased federal funding of "gifts" to the Apaches, several Arizonans allegedly staged mock raids on isolated settlements. One of these settlements was in Aravaipa Canyon.

Indian affairs in early 1870s Arizona lurched back and forth between peace and war. Each new round of hostilities brought increasing conflict between the settlers and the soldiers. The report of the Indian Peace Commission, in 1867, led to the creation of the Board of Indian Commissioners two years later. Investigating abuses within the Office of Indian Affairs, the commissioners spearheaded a growing movement for Indian rights that culminated in the Quaker Policy of President Ulysses S. Grant's administration.

A major problem faced by Arizona's military was they had too few soldiers for too vast an area of land. Most chronicles of the time regarded Apaches as the biggest menace, but Yuman-speaking Yavapais, who were often identified as Apache Mohaves or Apache Yumas, killed and mutilated settlers just as often. Divided into four subtribes, the Tolkapaya, or Western Yavapais, the Yavepe and the Wipukpaya or Northeastern Yavapais and the Kewevkapaya or Southeastern Yavapais, the Yavapais ranged from the Colorado River to the Tonto Basin. Like the Apaches, they were mobile and extremely independent, their only political authorities being war chiefs and advisory chiefs selected by local groups. This made running down or negotiating with more than one Yavapai group at a time extremely difficult for the United States Army. Troops had to pursue the Yavapais across rough desert terrain. Many of the soldiers deserted, fleeing places such as Camp Grant, a sun-scorched collection of adobe buildings.

=== Camp Grant ===
Early in 1871, a 37-year-old first lieutenant named Royal Emerson Whitman assumed command of Camp Grant, Arizona Territory, about 50 miles (80 km) northeast of Tucson. In February 1871, five old Apache women straggled into Camp Grant to look for a son who had been taken prisoner. Whitman fed them and treated them kindly, so other Apaches from Aravaipa and Pinal bands soon came to the post to receive rations of beef and flour. That spring, Whitman created a refuge along Aravaipa Creek, about five miles (8 km) east of Camp Grant for nearly 500 Aravaipa and Pinal Apaches, including Chief Eskiminzin. The Apaches began cutting hay for the post's horses and harvesting barley in nearby ranchers' fields.

Whitman may have suspected that peace could not last. He urged Eskiminzin to move his people to the White Mountains near Fort Apache, which was established in 1870, but he refused. During the winter and spring, William S. Oury and Jesús María Elías formed a vigilante group, the Committee of Public Safety, which blamed every depredation in southern Arizona on the Camp Grant Apaches. After Apaches ran off livestock from San Xavier on April 10, Elías contacted his old ally, Francisco Galerita, leader of the Tohono O'odham at San Xavier. Oury collected arms and ammunition from his followers.

== Massacre ==
On the afternoon of April 28, six Americans, 48 Mexican Americans, and 92 Tohono O'odham gathered along Rillito Creek and set off on a march to Aravaipa Canyon; one of the Americans was William S. Oury, the brother of Granville Henderson Oury. At dawn on Sunday, April 30, they surrounded the Apache camp. The O'odham were the main fighters, while the Americans and Mexicans picked off Apaches who tried to escape. Most of the Apache men were off hunting in the mountains. All but eight of the corpses were women and children. The Tohono O'odham and Mexican participants captured twenty-nine Apache children and sold twenty-seven of them into slavery in Mexico. The other two managed to escape, returning to their relatives. A total of 144 Aravaipas and Pinals had been killed and mutilated, nearly all of them scalped.

== Aftermath ==
Lieutenant Whitman searched for the wounded, found only one woman, buried the bodies, and dispatched interpreters into the mountains to find the Apache men and assure them his soldiers had not participated in the "vile transaction". The following evening, the surviving Aravaipas began trickling back to Camp Grant. Many of the settlers in southern Arizona considered the attack justifiable homicide and agreed with Oury, but this was not the end of the story.

After the massacre, the Apache and Pinal survivors were primarily concerned about the fate of their captured children. The US government, seeking to reduce violence between the region's groups, organized a peace conference involving the main participants in the spring of 1872.The survivors used this conference to insist on the return of the twenty-seven remaining children abducted during the massacre. However, American officials only found six of those children. Furthermore, as per an agreement made during the conference, they were made to live on Camp Grant under the oversight of an governess, preventing them from returning to their relatives. The rest of the children were most likely sold off, but there are no records of this because the sales were kept secret. The absence of records left their narratives of the massacre – some of the few that still existed – unable to be recorded and preserved.

Within a week of the slaughter, a local businessman, William Hopkins Tonge, wrote to the Commissioner of Indian Affairs stating, "The Indians at the time of the massacre being so taken by surprise and considering themselves perfectly safe with scarcely any arms, those that could get away ran for the mountains." He was the first person to refer to what had taken place as a massacre.

The military and the Eastern press called it a massacre, so President Grant informed Governor A.P.K. Safford that if the perpetrators were not brought to trial, he would place Arizona under martial law. In October 1871, a Tucson grand jury indicted 100 of the assailants with 108 counts of murder. The trial, two months later, focused solely on Apache depredations; it took the jury just 19 minutes to pronounce a verdict of not guilty. Western Apache groups soon left their farms and gathering places near Tucson in fear of subsequent attacks. As pioneer families arrived and settled in the area, Apaches were never able to regain hold of much of their ancestral lands in the San Pedro River Valley. Many groups of Apaches joined up with the Yavapais in Tonto Basin, and from there, a guerrilla war began which lasted until 1875.

In 1873, fear of settler violence led the survivors to move away from Aravaipa Canyon to the San Carlos Reservation. However, in 1877, after living under poor conditions there, Aravaipa and Pinal leaders – and their followers – returned to establish farms. Attempts at return were stifled by the likelihood of violence. In 1887, Apache living near Aravaipa Canyon were threatened with mob violence, which led some to return to the San Carlos reservation, fearing a repeat of the Camp Grant Massacre.

Some Apache even fraternized with their former enemies; Captain Chiquito, whose two wives had been killed in the massacre, later established cordial relations with Jesús Mariá Elías. He likely did so to defiantly show that his family was still flourishing, despite the loss that Elías had helped inflict on him.

=== Apache-O'odham Relations ===
Following the massacre, common experiences with oppression and hardship led the Apache and the O'odham to abandon and gradually forget their long-standing rivalry. George Crook's military campaign forced virtually all Apaches onto reservations by April 1873. Likewise, by the mid-1880s, emboldened settlers and growing cattle herds increasingly pushed the O'odham onto reservations. When on these reservations, the O'odham fought with settlers over water access and with governments over their ability to cross an increasingly policed US-Mexico border. As for the Aravaipa and Pinal Apache on the San Carlos reservation, they dealt with disease, conflict with the other very distinct Apache groups on the reservation, and the arbitrary arrest of leaders by federal Indian agents. They also both had to deal with federal policy concerning boarding schools and jobs. In both situations, the primary causes of their hardships were settlers and the US government. Thus, the O'odham view of the Apache as enemies became less and less prominent. This allowed for some reconciliation between the two groups. Some O'odham accelerated that reconciliation when they questioned their historic cooperation with settlers and wondered if being more hostile to them, like the Apache had been, could have gotten themselves a better outcome. Furthermore, by the 1890s, violent conflict between Apaches and O'odham had not occurred for the first time in centuries. The shared experiences and lack of conflict allowed Apache-O'odham relations to be much more amicable.O'odham re-tellings of the 1872 peace conference emphasized this newfound cooperative spirit, which was so different from the antagonistic relationship they had during the time of the Camp Grant Massacre.

=== The Americanization of Arizona ===
The growing Americanization of Southwest Arizona led Mexican-Americans to see settlers, rather than Apache warriors, as their main opposition. The expansion of railroads towards Tucson induced a massive shift in the area's status quo. The travel it facilitated brought about many new settlers who increasingly Americanized the region, creating a society that looked down upon both Mexican-Americans and the many Americans with Mexican wives. That led to a reduction in all long-time settlers' social standing. However, the growing Americanization more deeply affected long-time Mexican-American settlers than their American counterparts. Mexican-Americans faced discrimination and exclusion from community affairs, and the land they owned was requisitioned by both settlers and the US government.

=== Growing silence about the massacre ===
When studying the Apache wars, the Camp Grant Massacre was easily substituted by US military campaigns against Geronimo. Those military campaigns didn't lead to questions about settler brutality like the Camp Grant Massacre did, and were thus more comfortable to talk about. Textbooks and popular media like theater and movies also made efforts to conceal the violence and brutality of Arizona's past, which led them to omit the Camp Grant Massacre.

While the massacre gradually disappeared from the general American public's memory, locally the memory was better retained. The perpetrators' narratives remained entrenched in small pockets, like in the Society of Arizona Pioneers – an organization created to address the decline of long-time settlers' social status – and its later iterations. Furthermore, some Tucson residents falsely claimed to have been participants in the massacre into the early 20th century.

=== Control of records and historical narratives ===
The perpetrators preserved their narratives of the massacre through the Society of Arizona Pioneers. This organization – whose leadership, initially, was largely filled by those present at the massacre – gradually became the official steward of Arizona's historical records. Many of the documents it preserved were transcribed talks given at its meetings, such as ones given by Oury. The organization's status as a historical organization gradually grew, which lent its documents credibility. Therefore, when describing settler-Apache relations in the 19^{th} century, some historical works written in the early 20th century relied entirely on Oury's narratives to do so. The organization got renamed the Arizona Pioneer's Historical Society in 1897, and led to DeLong's authorship of a chronicle of Arizona's history in 1901. It was renamed again in 1971, becoming the Arizona Historical Society, which still exists as of December 2025. This organization's control of records has propagated and lent authority to narratives like Oury's, which describe the Camp Grant Massacre as an act of self defense against Apache violence and undermine the deaths the perpetrators caused.

== Site of Camp Grant and the massacre ==
The massacre occurred in the vicinity of Camp Grant. In 1871, its location was on an upper terrace on the east bank of the San Pedro River, just north of the junction with Aravaipa Creek. The camp was in the vicinity of 32°50'51.22"N, 110°42'11.91"W. The Camp Grant site was near the present Aravaipa Campus of Central Arizona Community College, which is located between the towns of Mammoth and Winkelman on Arizona State Route 77. Few remains of the site are visible.

Current authorities place the massacre site south of the Aravaipa Creek and about five miles upstream from Camp Grant. No marker is at the site of the massacre, and the location is only generally known.

In 2021, descendants of those massacred opposed the siting of a massive copper mine at Oak Flat, proximate to the massacre site.

== See also ==
- List of massacres in Arizona
- Camp Grant, Arizona
