= Fighting by Southern Federals =

1912 book by Charles Anderson

Fighting by Southern Federals is a 1912 non-fiction book by Charles Carter Anderson published by the Neale Publishing Company.

== Overview ==
Fighting by Southern Federals was the first book written about the titular "Southern Federals," who were Southerners who supported the Union during the American Civil War instead of the Confederate States of America.

== Development ==
Charles Anderson, the book's author, was a trained lawyer who became an amateur historian after retiring from the law. He was a member of the Virginia Historical Society.

=== Publication history ===
Fighting by Southern Federals was published by the Neale Publishing Company in 1912, one of several books relating to the Civil War published that year by Neale.

The book was published under the full title Fighting by Southern Federals, In which the author places the numerical strength of the armies that fought for the Confederacy at approximately 1,000,000 men, and shown that 296,579 white soldiers living in the South, and 137,676 colored soldiers, and approximately 200,000 men living in the North that were born in the South, making 634,255 southern soldiers, fought for the Preservation of the Union. The title was so long that one review described it as giving "so good an idea of the contents of this remarkable book that little more need be said."

== Reception ==
Fighting by Southern Federals was received well in the popular press upon release. The Baltimore Sun praised Anderson's "vivid" descriptions of Civil War battles, while The Courier Journal described him as having made "an interesting contribution to history." A review in The Times-Democrat noted that no book had ever attempted to chart the number of Southerners who fought for the Union and singled out Anderson's listing of individual soldiers and their careers as a point of praise. A similarly positive review was published in The Lexington Herald.

Present-day historians have been more critical. In his 1992 book Lincoln's Loyalists, Richard N. Current heavily criticized Anderson's conclusions, noting that Anderson included Maryland, Kentucky, and Missouri in his data, even though those states never joined the Confederacy. Current's own analysis concluded that only 104,000 Southerners fought for the Union. The book is listed in Robert K. Krick's retrospective on Neale Publishing.
