= Thomas F. Wright =

Thomas Forster Wright (November 5, 1830– April 26, 1873) was an officer during the American Civil War. Born at Jefferson Barracks, Missouri, he was the son of General George Wright.

Wright served in the 2nd California Cavalry Regiment, 6th California Infantry Regiment, 1861–1864, Colonel of the 2nd California Infantry Regiment, October 1865 to May 1866.

While commanding the 2nd California Infantry Regiment in 1865, he oversaw the construction of Camp Grant, Arizona Territory at the confluence of Aravaipa Creek and the San Pedro River, which was briefly known as Camp Wright.

After the Civil War he returned to the rank of first lieutenant and remained in the army for service in the Indian Campaigns. During the Modoc War, while Lieutenant Wright was serving as an officer with the U.S. 12th Infantry Regiment on April 26, 1873, he and some of his men were ambushed and killed by Modoc Indians near the Lava Beds in northern California.

Wright's body was interred in Sacramento Historic City Cemetery in Sacramento, California.

== See also ==
- Camp Grant, Arizona Territory
