= Edward M. Alfriend =

Edward Morrisson Alfriend (October 25, 1837 – October 24, 1901) was an American playwright, novelist, businessman, and veteran of the American Civil War.

== Life and career ==
Born in Richmond, Virginia on October 25, 1837, Edward Morrisson Alfriend was the son of Thomas M. and Mary Alfriend. He father was a prominent businessman in Richmond who was president of the Virginia Fire and Marine Insurance Company (VFMIC). He was educated at schools in Richmond, and at the College of William & Mary. He served in the 44th Virginia Infantry Regiment during the American Civil War, and fought in the Shenandoah Valley campaign of 1864. He deserted the Confederate States Army, and was court marshaled and cashiered in 1865. In his early life he worked in his father's insurance business and then succeeded him in leading the VFMIC to great success. He served as Virginia's delegate to the 1871 National Insurance Convention; a role he was appointed to by Virginia governor Gilbert C. Walker.

Alfriend began his writing career by penning magazine articles for Old Dominion Magazine, Cosmopolitan, and Lippincott's Monthly Magazine while working in business in Richmond. He wrote at least one play while living in Richmond which was not staged. In the fall of 1889 he resigned from his business position in Richmond in order to pursue a career as a writer in New York City. He lived at the Ashland House hotel in New York City for most of the rest of his life. He adapted William Dean Howells's 1875 novel A Foregone Conclusion for the theater. It was his first staged play, and it opened in Richmond in May 1890 prior to a run on Broadway at Palmer's Theatre in June 1890.

Alfriend penned several more plays which were staged on Broadway. Theses included The Louisianian (1891, Madison Square Theatre), Across the Potomac (1892, Proctor's Theatre), The Great Diamond Robbery (1895, American Theatre), New York (1897, American Theatre), and The Magdalene (1897, Murray Hill Theatre). He also wrote the novels A Woman's Ordeal, The Diplomats, and His Double Life. His works were not critically successful, but were popular with the public.

He died suddenly of kidney failure on October 24, 1901.
