= The Outcast (Pirandello novel) =

- Newton Compton publication
- Author: Luigi Pirandello
- Original title: L'Esclusa
- Working title: Marta Ajala
- Translator: Leo Ongley (1925); Bradford A. Masoni
- Language: Italian
- Genre: Novel
- Publisher: Newton Compton, Rutgers (2023)
- Publication date: 1901 (as serial); 1908 (single volume)
- Publication place: Italy
- English publication date: 1925
- Media type: Print (serial and hardback)
- Pages: 97 pp

The Outcast (Italian: L'Esclusa (Italian pronunciation: [leˈskluːza]) was Luigi Pirandello's first novel. Written in 1893 with the title Marta Ajala, it was originally published in episodes in the Roman newspaper La Tribuna from June 29 to August 16, 1901, with the definitive title L'Esclusa. It was finally republished in single volume in 1908 in Milan by the Fratelli Treves. In this edition, a letter dedicated to Luigi Capuana was also published in which the author expressed his concerns that the "humoristic foundation" of the novel might have escaped those who had read the newspaper version. He also points out that "every will is excluded, even though the characters are left with the full illusion that they are acting voluntarily." He added that "nature, without any apparent order, bristling with contradictions is often extremely remote from the work of art..." which almost always arbitrarily harmonizes and rationalizes reality. The novel is inspired by Sicilian culture, with scholars also noting the influence of realist writers such as Luigi Capuana, Giovanni Verga, and Antonio Fogazzaro.

== Plot ==
The story itself is set in a small village in Sicily. The protagonist Marta Ajala feels "excluded" from the society in which she lives because of having catastrophically lost the position and status that she had been assigned in the order of things: the position of a submissive and bored housewife who never quite felt at ease in her role, but who had achieved respect in society because of it. It is a role that she does not regret losing but whose sudden and violent loss has thrown her into a dramatic situation: she has been kicked out of her home by her husband, who caught her by surprise in the act of reading a letter from someone who has been courting her but whose advances she has always rejected.

The precipitous decision of the husband overwhelmed with rage; the attitude of Marta's father who, even while knowing that his daughter is innocent, totally supports her husband's decision out of a misbegotten sense of masculine spiritual solidarity and ends up dying of shame; the submissive suffering of the mother and sister, constantly ready, in order to conform to traditional convictions, to counsel her surrender and obedience; the choral malevolence of the villagers, taking advantage of a religious procession that is passing by under their windows to publicly jeer and shout names at her, are the elements of a minutely described painting, in the manner of realism, which illustrates the closed mentality of the village.

But Marta's reaction is only partly similar to that of the typical characters of the naturalistic novel. She reveals a much more complex psychology which begins with a petit bourgeoisie self-satisfaction for the letters of Gregorio Alvignani and gradually develops into an obstinate struggle against all of society for a moral and economic revenge which she will finally end up obtaining, but joylessly.

The cruel game of chance prevails over the objectivity of the narrative, according to an unexpected logic, expressed in a series of coincidences that betray their own hidden meaning. The father dies at the same time that Marta's baby, which she had been carrying in her womb with so much repulsion, is born, as if to signify a repudiation and detachment from the past. Meanwhile, in the streets of the village, the people are celebrating the victory of Alvignani in the elections, a premonitory sign of Marta's eventual redemption and revenge. The singularity of circumstances bursts wide open in the final scene: Marta's husband, after kicking her out of her home, making her suffer, and compromising the birth of his own son, now takes her back when she has actually become guilty of the sin of which she was falsely accused and is carrying her lover's baby in her womb.

In giving herself to Alvignani, who helped her in dealing with the injustices of the scholastic authorities, she seems to adapt herself to the role of his lover, which has been imposed on her by society. But her state of mind is never one of passive surrender, even if her restless struggle against circumstances dominated by an unfathomable force will turn out to be in vain. In the end, what defeats her is not the society by which she is rehabilitated but life itself, which brings with it a suffering that no success can cancel.

It is significant, in fact, that the author uses the word l'esclusa precisely at the opening of the second part of the novel, where, in an atmosphere redolent of spring, Marta seems to be on the verge of resurrection. Her tenacious struggle against everyone and against resignation has allowed her to obtain the much-desired teaching position that has permitted her to rescue her mother and sister from extreme poverty. But the happiness of these two women, of which she is secretly proud, is what forces her to recognize her own spiritual isolation and her inability to reinsert herself into society. "She alone was the excluded one, she alone would never again find her place."

== Translations into English ==
L'esclusa has been translated twice into English. The first English edition, titled The Outcast, was translated by Leo Ongley and published by E. P. Dutton & Company in 1925. A new English version of the novel, translated by Bradford A. Masoni and also titled The Outcast, was published by Rutgers University Press in August 2023.

== Works about Pirandello as novelist ==
- M. Alicata. I Romanzi di Pirandello. Primato. Rome. 1941.
- A. Janner. Pirandello novelliere. Rassegna Nazionale. Rome. 1932.
- L. Cremonte. Pirandello novelliere. La Nuova Italia. Florence. 1935.
- U. Appolonio. Luigi Pirandello, in Romanzieri e novellieri d'Italia nel Secolo XX. Vol. 1. Rome. Stanze del Libro. 1936.
- G. Petronio. Pirandello novelliere e la crisi del realismo. Lucca. Edizione Lucentia. 1950.
- I. Pancrazi. Luigi Pirandello narratore, in Scrittore di Oggi, III. Laterza. Bari. 1950.
- Bradford A. Masoni. Pirandello Proto-Modernist: A New Reading of L'esclusa. Peter Lang. Oxford. 2019.
