= Wayland Fuller Dunaway =

American writer and academic (1875–1956)

Wayland Fuller Dunaway Jr. (May 22, 1875 – 1956) was a professor and author in the United States. He wrote about various aspects of Pennsylvania's history including a history of Pennsylvania State College.

He was born in Kilmarnock, Virginia. His father, Wayland Fuller Dunaway Sr. (1841–1916), served as a captain of Company I in the 49th Virginia regiment in the Army of Northern Virginia and wrote Reminiscences of a Rebel published in 1913. He became a clergyman after the war. Roberta née Pinckard Dunaway was his mother.

He graduated from Richmond College. He became an ordained Baptist minister at Crozier Seminary and then returned to Richmond College for his master's degree.

He worked as a minister and principal. He married Mary May and had three children. He left the ministry and graduated with a second master's degree from the University of Chicago after which he worked at the history department at Columbia University where he received a doctorate. He was hired as an assistant professor of European History at Pennsylvania State College and eventually became a full professor of American History in 1926. In 1941, he was appointed the College Historian for the Pennsylvania State College. He retired in 1944. Dunaway was one of the founders of the Pennsylvania Historical Association in 1934.

== Writings ==
- History of Pennsylvania (1935)
- The History of the James River
- History of the Kanawha Company, doctoral thesis published as a monograph in 1922
- The Scotch - Irish of Colonial Pennsylvania University of North Carolina Press (1944)
- "The Scotch-Irish in War"
- "Pennsylvania as an Early Distributing Center of Population"
