= Selected Poems of Henry Ames Blood =

1901 poetry collection by Henry Ames Blood

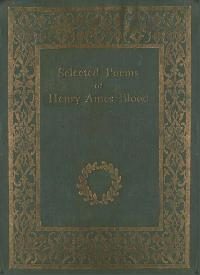
- Cover of Selected Poems of Henry Ames Blood
- Author: Henry Ames Blood
- Language: English
- Genre: poetry
- Publisher: The Neale Publishing Company
- Publication date: 1901
- Publication place: United States
- Media type: Print (hardback)
- Pages: 88 pp.

Selected Poems of Henry Ames Blood is a collection of poetry by American poet Henry Ames Blood. While his verse had been widely anthologized during his lifetime, this volume was the only book devoted solely to his verse. It was published in hardcover in Washington, D.C. by The Neale Publishing Company in 1901. It was reprinted in paperback by the Kessinger Publishing Company in September, 2007.

The book collects thirty poems by the author, selected by his widow Mary M. Blood as a retrospective sampling of his life's work. The source citations are as in the collection; where data is incomplete the original publications have been consulted where possible, and the missing data supplied in brackets.

== Contents ==
- "Jeanette" (Harper's Weekly, May 19, 1879)
- "The Rock in the Sea" (The Century Magazine, August 1883)
- "The Chimney-Nook" (Willis' Home Journal, May 5, 1860)
- "The Last Visitor" (publication and date not cited [1895 at latest])
- "The War of the Dryads" (Knickerbocker Magazine, [July 1863, as "The Last War of the Dryads"])
- "Yearnings" (publication and date not cited [1882 at latest])
- "The Old Year" (The Independent, [December 28, 1871, as "The Death of the Old Year"])
- "The Two Enchantments" (The Century Magazine, January 1883)
- "Fantasie" (Knickerbocker Magazine, [January 1864])
- "The Masque in Fantasie" (Knickerbocker Magazine, 1860 [sic: February 1864])
- "The Grand Orchestra" (The Independent, [January 11, 1872])
- "Sighs in the South" (New York Weekly Tribune, October 13, 1862)
- "Thoreau. In Memoriam" (publication and date not cited)
- "The Invisible Piper" (publication and date not cited [1882 at latest])
- "Shakespeare" (New York Tribune, date not cited [1891 at latest])
- "At the Grave. In Memory of A. M." (The Century Magazine, February 1887)
- "Pro Mortuis" (New York Post, July 15, 1862)
- "The Serene Message" (The Century Magazine, date not cited)
- "Comrades" (The Century Magazine, December 1887)
- "May Flowers" (New York Weekly Tribune, April 26, 1863)
- "The Fairy Boat" (publication and date not cited)
- "A Midnight Chorus" (publication and date not cited)
- "The Song of the Savoyards" (Scribner's Magazine, June 1875)
- "Webster" (New York Observer, June 17, 1886)
- "Old Friends" (Boston Advertiser, November 15, 1889)
- "Margie" (Youth's Companion, May 21, 1891)
- "Saint Goethe's Night" (publication and date not cited)
- "The Fighting Parson" (The Century Magazine, May 1890)
- "The Drummer" (The Century Magazine, July 1891)
- "Ad Astra" (The Century Magazine, December 1888)

== Reception ==
"A dainty memorial volume ... [with contents] gathered from the Century Magazine, Scribner's Independent and other periodicals to which Mr. Blood was a highly appreciated occasional poetic contributor. The work of selection has been made with taste and judgment [and] [t]he little volume is handsomely made." Cleveland Plain Dealer, March 9, 1902, p. 25.

"Selected Poems by Henry Ames Blood is a book published by the Neale Company, Washington, D. C. It is attractive in appearance, and the verses, many of which are reprints from the best magazines, have strength and a real poetic beauty of expression. The last one in the book, "Ad Astra," appeared first in the Century Magazine, and is spirited and fine. There are thirty poems, some long, some short, but all worthy of consideration by lovers of poetry." Overland Monthly, v. 39, no. 5, May 1902, p. 920.

"In the 'Selected Poems' of Henry Ames Blood may be found many fresh and cheery bits of verse, most of which have already been published in literary journals, but whose collection in permanent form is not amiss. They make no effort to soar into the heights of poetry, but are picturesque and spirited, with here and there a touch of genial humor." The Era, v. 10, no. 2, August 1902, p. 222.
