= Eskiminzin =

Apache leader (1828–1894)

- Eskiminzin "Men Stand in Line for Him"
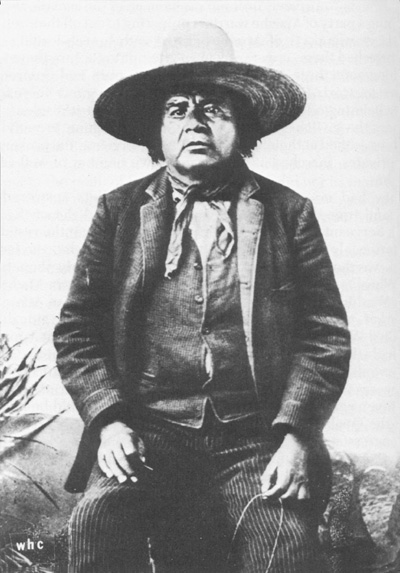

Aravaipa Apache leader

Personal details
- Born: c. 1828 near the Pinal Mountains, born as a Pinaleño Apache
- Died: 1894 San Carlos Reservation
- Known for: establishing the San Carlos Reservation

Eskiminzin (Ndee biyati' / Nnee biyati': "Men Stand in Line for Him"; or Hashkebansiziin, Hàckíbáínzín - "Angry, Men Stand in Line for Him", c. 1828–1894) was a local group chief of the Aravaipa band of the San Carlos group of the Western Apache during the Apache Wars.

Eskiminzin was born around 1828 near the Pinal Mountains as a Pinaleño/Pinal Apache, and through marriage into the Aravaipa, he became one of them and later their chief. He desired a lasting peace between the indigenous peoples of America and the whites. In 1871, Eskiminzin and the Pinaleño/Pinal band of the San Carlos Apache under Capitán Chiquito accepted an offer by the U.S. Government to settle down and plant crops in the vicinity of Camp Grant, a fort near present-day Tucson, Arizona.

This resettlement plan was short-lived, however. On April 30, 1871, a band of anti-Apache American civilians under William S. Oury, Mexican civilians under Jesús María Elías, and Tohono O'odham warriors under their chief Francisco Galerita launched a merciless assault on the settlement without warning. In what became known as the Camp Grant massacre, 144 occupants (almost entirely children and women) were indiscriminately butchered and mutilated in the space of less than an hour, nearly all of them scalped. Twenty-nine children were captured and sold into slavery in Mexico by the Tohono O'odham and the Mexicans themselves. Eskiminzin survived the tragedy. However, later in life he was suspected of sheltering his son-in-law the Apache Kid, was imprisoned without a trial, and died soon after his release in 1894.
