= Jacques Nicolas Léger =

Haitian lawyer, politician and diplomat

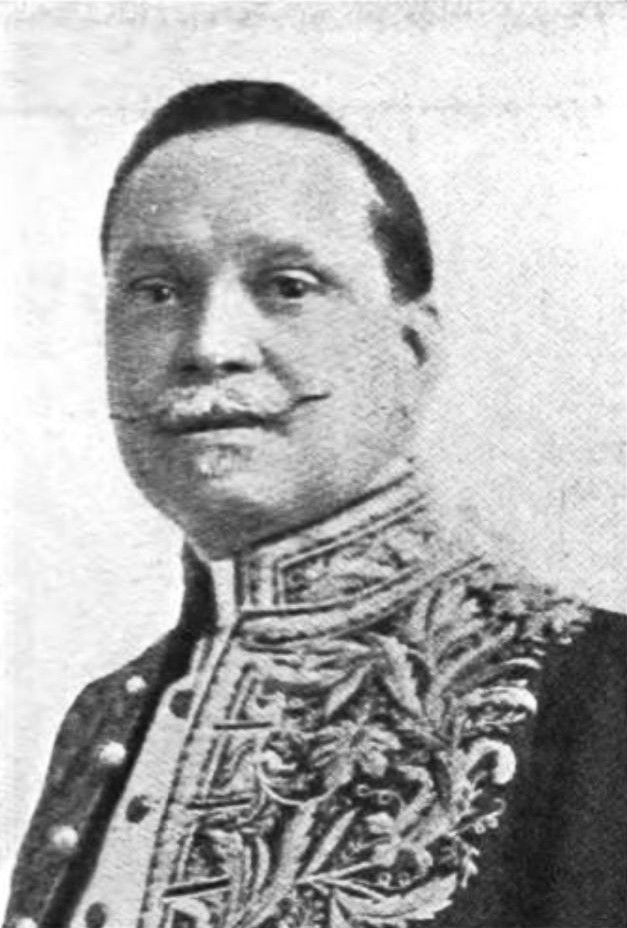
- Born: 1859; Les Cayes, Haiti
- Died: February 5, 1918 (aged 58–59); Port-au-Prince, Haiti
- Occupations: Lawyer, politician, diplomat

Jacques Nicolas Léger (July 20, 1859–1918) was a Haitian lawyer, politician, and diplomat.

Léger was born at Les Cayes, Haiti, in 1859. He received his early education in Haiti, and as a very young man went to Paris, where he continued his higher studies and also received his legal training. His father had been a member of the Haitian senate and a statesman of note, so that young Léger began to take an active part in the politics of his country at an early age. In 1881, when only 22 years old, he was made secretary of the Haitian legation in Paris, and a little later, upon the abrupt resignation of Minister Charles Séguy Villevaleix, the young secretary was made charge d'affaires. Upon his return to Haiti, he resumed the practice of law at Port-au-Prince, and also became editor-in-chief of an influential political journal. In 1890 he was made chief of a division in the department of foreign affairs, and in 1892 became one of the founders of the Société de Législation of Port-au-Prince, later becoming its president. He was also made president of the Order of Barristers of Port-au-Prince and was subsequently made a member of the permanent court of arbitration at The Hague.

Having been elected as a member of the Chamber of Deputies of Haiti, Léger took high rank in that legislative body, serving as chairman of the committee of foreign affairs and as a member of the judiciary committee. In 1896 he was appointed envoy extraordinary and minister plenipotentiary of Haiti at Washington, a post he held for nearly 13 years. While serving in this post, he was appointed as the delegate from Haiti to the Second Pan American Congress, and thereafter made vice chairman of the committee on regulations for the Third International Conference. As a member of the governing board of the Pan American Union he served on many important committees. In 1911 he was appointed Foreign Minister of his country, a post he held until May 1913, and to which he was recalled by President Oreste Zamor in 1914.

Upon his retirement from public office Léger resumed his legal and literary work, for which he gained renown that extended far beyond Haiti. As a writer his most important work was in the lines of law, diplomacy, and history, his best known published works being:

- "Haiti et la Révision" (1885)
- "La Politique Extérieure d'Haiti" (1886)
- "Recueil des Traités et Conventions de la République d'Haiti" (1891)
- "Code de Procédure Civile d'Haiti" (1902)
- "Haiti: Her History and Her Detractors" (1907)

He died at Port-au-Prince on February 5, 1918.
