= Intermere =

1901 novel by William Alexander Taylor

- Book cover for Intermere (1901)
- Author: William Alexander Taylor
- Language: English
- Genre: Utopian novel
- Publisher: The XX. Century Pub. Co
- Publication date: 1901
- Publication place: United States
- Media type: Print (hardback & paperback)
- Pages: 148
- OCLC: 6947701

Intermere is a 1901 utopian novel by William Alexander Taylor. The story concerns the journey of a man lost in a shipwreck and saved by the commander of a hidden ancient country, Intermere. The protagonist is instructed in Intermere's superior technology, economics, and methods of government. Taylor introduces themes on the topics of term limits for politicians, the equal distribution of wealth, and a system of motivation and reward for scientific advancement. Despite a somewhat socialist system of restriction upon trade and support for the poor, the economics are capitalist with only small business (no more than five employees) allowed to operate.

== Plot introduction ==
Notably in this utopian community women are only permitted to earn half as much as men and cannot vote. Divorce is unknown and Intermere's citizens are said not to have a sense of humor.
