= Carlisle S. Abbott =

American pioneer and politician

Carlisle Stewart Abbott
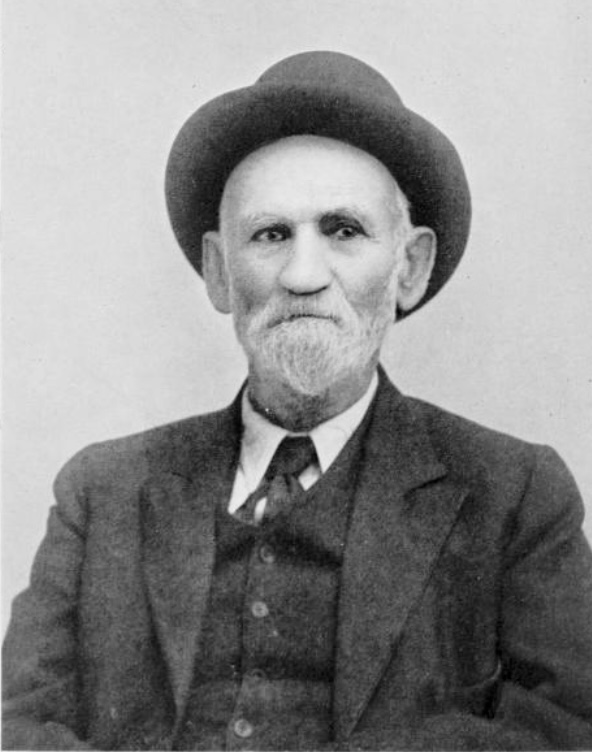
- Abbott in 1917

Member of the California State Assembly from the 6th district
- In office December 6, 1875 – December 3, 1877

Member of the California State Assembly from the 6th district
- In office September 4, 1877 – December 3, 1879

Personal details
- Born: February 26, 1828 Quebec, Canada
- Died: March 31, 1919 (aged 91) Monterey, California, U.S.
- Resting place: Garden of Memories Memorial Park Cemetery, Salinas, California
- Party: Republican
- Spouse: Alice Elizabeth Merriman
- Children: 3
- Education: University of Southern California Law School

Carlisle S. Abbott (February 26, 1828 – March 31, 1919) was a Canadian-born pioneer who migrated to the United States during the California Gold Rush. He served in the California State Assembly, representing Monterey County from 1876 to 1879. Abbott raised dairy cattle and founded the Monterey & Salinas Valley Railroad, the first narrow gauge railroad in the state. Abbott also built the Abbott House, a lodging establishment in Salinas, which was later renamed the Cominos Hotel.

== Early life and education ==
Abbott was born on February 26, 1828, near Lake Memphremagog, Quebec, twelve miles north of the border separating Canada and Vermont. His ancestry can be traced back to George Abbott, an English settler, who settled in Andover, Massachusetts, following the conclusion of the Revolutionary war. His father was John Abbott, and his mother was Lydia Boynton. At the age 16, he ran away from home and journeyed to Sycamore, Illinois.

== Career ==
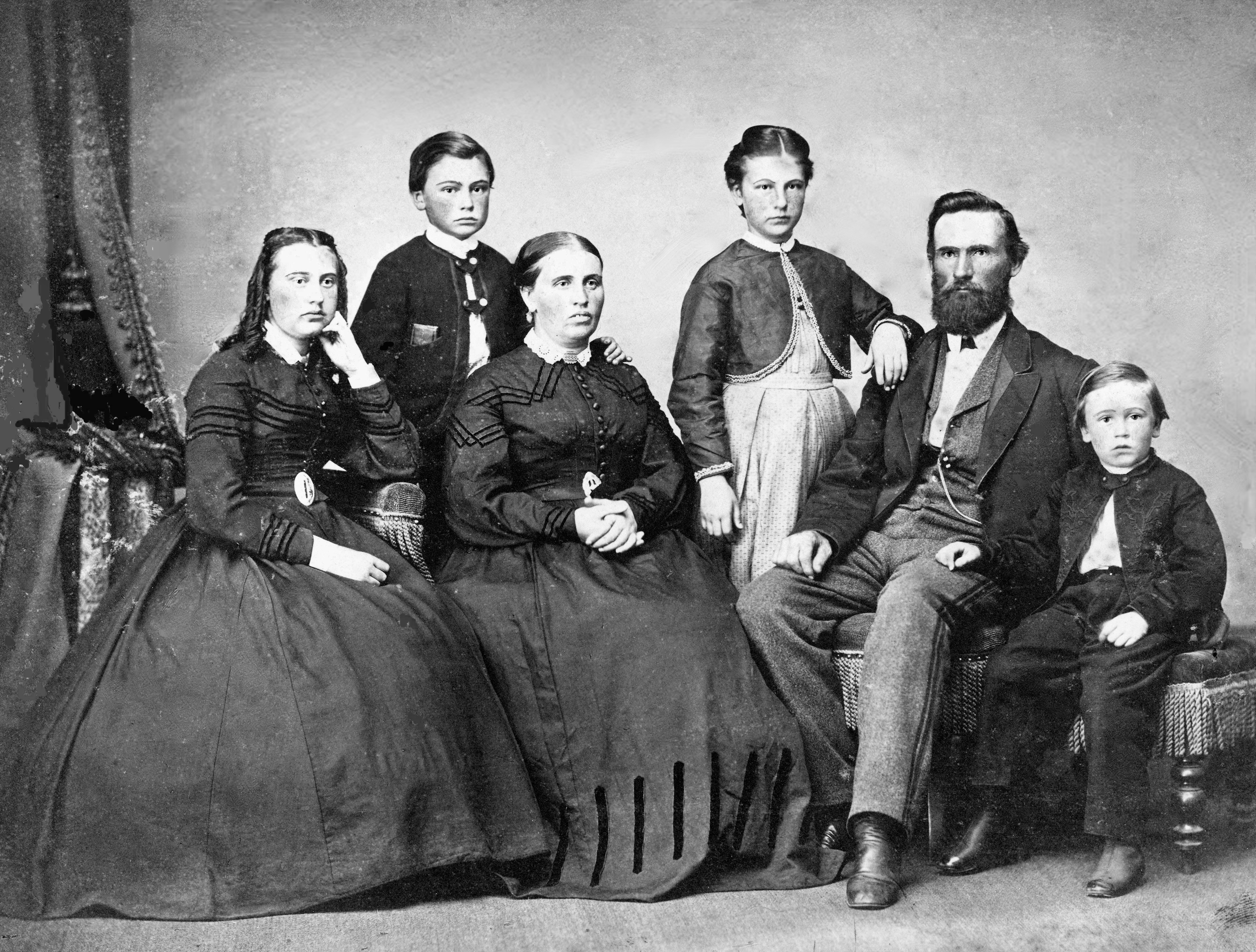
Carlisle Abbott and his family after they left Point Reyes (1865)

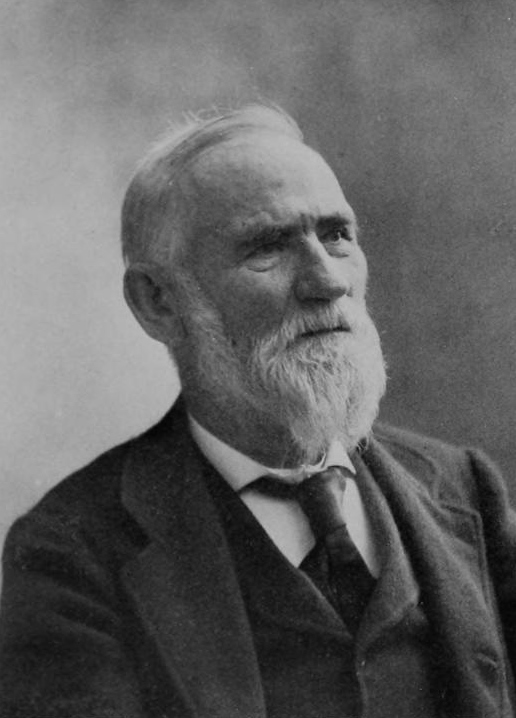
C. S. Abbott (1903)

On March 8, 1850, during the California gold rush, Abbott embarked from Beloit, Wisconsin, across the Great Plains en route California alongside a group of twelve men, including his brother Alvin. After spending some time in the gold mines of Sacramento County, California, he returned to Beloit via Panama, arriving in New York on Christmas day in November 1851. On March 19, 1852, he married Alice Elizabeth Merriman in Beloit. Their honeymoon involved a return trip to California, during which Abbott led a caravan consisting of sixty oxen, fifty cows and heifers, five wagons, ten horses, and took eighteen men and passengers. Upon reaching California, Abbott settled along the Sacramento River, later relocating to Nevada City, where he ventured into the dairy business.

In 1858, Abbott settled in Point Reyes, Marin County. There, he delved into dairy farming, primarily with Spanish cattle and producing butter and cheese for the San Francisco market. He also served a term as Justice of the Peace. By 1865, he relocated to the Salinas Valley in Monterey County, leasing approximately 8,886 acres (3,596 ha) of land for a term of five years. Later, he purchased land for (equivalent to $74 in 2025) per acre, expanding his operations, with a daily milking output of one thousand and five hundred cows. The property he owned and cultivated eventually became the town of Spreckels, California. Later, Abbott acquired 12,000 acres (4,900 ha) of the Rancho San Lorenzo at the valley's southern end, where he continued farming and sheep rearing.

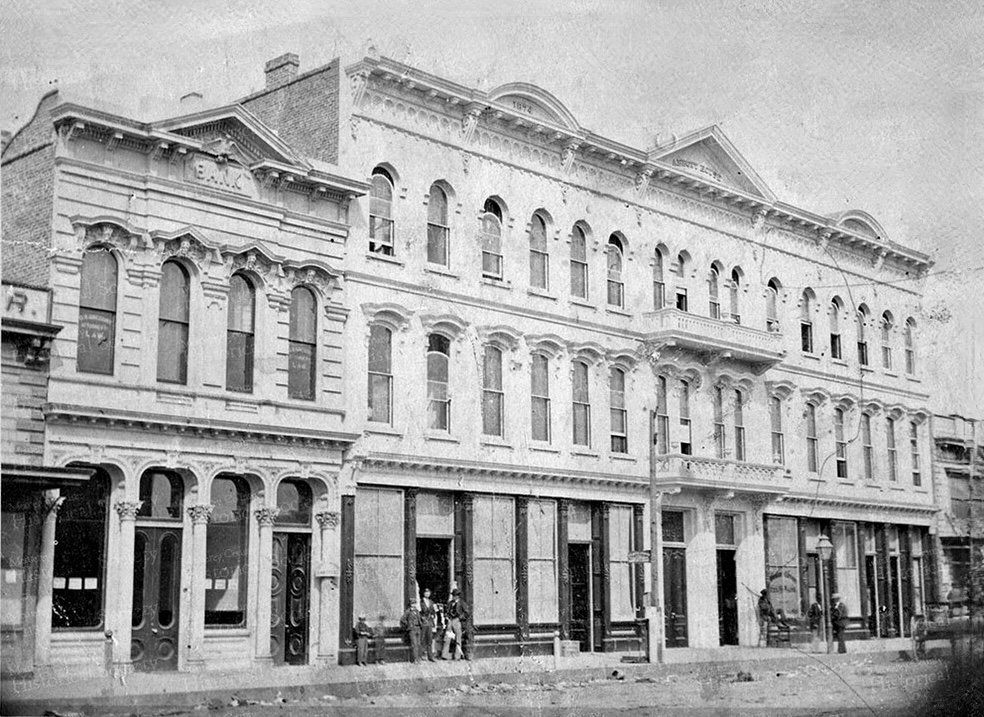
Abbott House was built in 1873 on Main Street, Salinas

Built in 1873, Abbott House is a three-story hotel situated on Main Street in Salinas. It was later renovated and renamed the Cominos Hotel. The hotel served as a lodging establishment in Salinas.

Abbott joined with David Jacks in 1874 to build the narrow gauge Monterey & Salinas Valley Railroad, the first narrow gauge railroad to operate in California. The line saw financial issues very soon after opening and was purchased by a subsidiary of the Southern Pacific on September 29, 1879. When the railroad went bankrupt, Abbott lost everything.

In 1917, Abbott wrote the book Recollections of a California Pioneer chronicling his life.

== Political career ==
In 1872, Abbott was appointed one of the delegates to the National Republican Convention, where President Ulysses S. Grant was nominated for his second term. Abbott served as a member of the California State Assembly representing Monterey County from 1876 to 1879. He was first elected to this role on September 7, 1875, and secured a second term on August 31, 1877.

== Death and legacy ==
Abbott died on March 31, 1919 in Monterey, California. Abbotts Lagoon situated within the Point Reyes National Seashore, and Abbott Street in Salinas bear his name.

== See also ==
- California State Assembly districts
