= Henry Ames Blood =

American dramatist

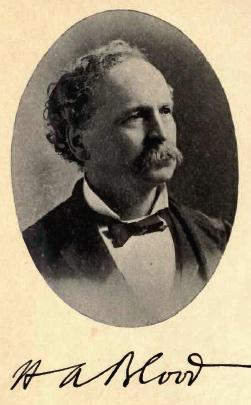
- Henry Ames Blood, from the frontispiece of Selected Poems of Henry Ames Blood (1901)
- Born: June 7, 1836; Temple, New Hampshire
- Died: December 30, 1900 (aged 64); Washington, D.C.
- Occupations: Civil servant, poet, playwright, historian, critic
- Writing career
- Period: 1860–1900
- Notable works: The History of Temple, N. H. Selected Poems of Henry Ames Blood

Henry Ames Blood (June 7, 1836 – December 30, 1900) was an American civil servant, poet, playwright, and historian. He is chiefly remembered for The History of Temple, N. H.

== Life ==
Blood was born in Temple, New Hampshire, the son of Ephraim Whiting and Lavinia (Ames) Blood. Due to his father's death on December 29, 1837, when he was a year and a half old, his childhood years were spent with his mother's family in New Ipswich, New Hampshire. When his mother remarried on February 9, 1842, he acquired a stepfather, Samphson Fletcher. He was educated at the New Ipswich Academy in New Ipswich, and Dartmouth College, from which he graduated in 1857. Afterwards, he was a schoolteacher for a few years in New Hampshire, Massachusetts, and Paris, Tennessee.

About 1861, he moved to Washington, DC, where he was employed for most of his adult life, to accept a clerkship in the Internal Revenue Department. After a short service there, he was transferred to the Department of State, in the employ of which he long remained. He also worked for the Bureau of the Census and the Department of the Treasury.

As a young government worker in Washington, DC, Blood was in the city at the time of Abraham Lincoln's assassination. His letters to his mother on the aftermath of the assassination and the trial of the conspirators were discovered in 2005 in one of the homes of Robert Todd Lincoln, and reveal an interesting impression of contemporary public sentiment concerning the events.

He was married twice, first, October 15, 1862, to Mary Jeannie Marshall, daughter of Orlando and Eliza Cunningham (Mansur) Marshall of New Ipswich, New Hampshire, and second, October 19, 1880, to Mary E. Miller, daughter of Col. Ephraim F. and Catherine (Seymour) Miller. From his second marriage, he had one son, Royal Henry Blood, born July 29, 1884, who died young in 1892.

Blood died at his home in Washington, DC, and was buried with his son in New Ipswich. His widow married again after his death, on February 11, 1902, to Col. Royal E. Whitman. On August 7, 1905, during a visit by the Whitmans to Portland, Maine, Mary was stricken with apoplexy, dying peacefully on August 8. Her funeral was held August 10 in New Ipswich. She bequeathed to the Public Library of New Ipswich $10,000 to establish the Henry Ames Blood and Royal Henry Blood Memorial Fund for the maintenance of the library, and another $10,000 to the town of Temple, New Hampshire, $8,000 for the erection of a schoolhouse, to be known as the Henry Ames Blood and Mary Miller Blood School, and $2,000 for the care and maintenance of the town common. These bequests were to be paid after the death of Col. Whitman.

== Works ==
Blood's The History of Temple, N. H. (1860) is still considered an important resource for the history of that region.

His poetry was highly regarded and anthologized in his own day, when he was considered in the first rank of American poets, but has been dismissed as overly sentimental by later critics. Among the periodicals and newspapers in which his verse appeared were Boston Advertiser, The Century Illustrated Monthly Magazine, Christian Union, Dollar Monthly Magazine, Flag of Our Union, Harper's Weekly, The Independent, The Knickerbocker Monthly, The Magazine of Poetry and Literary Review, New England Magazine, New York Observer, New York Post, New York Tribune, Scribner's Magazine, The Home Journal, and The Youth's Companion.

Blood's dramatic works appear never to have made much of an impression, either in his own lifetime or since. At least one of them (How Much I Loved Thee!, 1884) was published under the pseudonym of Raymond Eshobel, which is an anagram of the author's name.

== Bibliography ==
=== Nonfiction ===
- The History of Temple, N. H. (1860) (Google Books e-text)
- "Germany" (article) (1872)
- Proceedings in the Internal Revenue Office Commemorative of the Late Judge Israel Dille (1874)

=== Drama ===
- The Emigrant (1874)
- Lord Timothy Dexter, or, The Greatest Man in the East (1874) (Google Books e-text)
- The Spanish Mission, or, The Member from Nevada (1874)
- How Much I Loved Thee! A Drama (1884) (Google Books e-text)
- The Return of Ulysses

=== Poetry ===
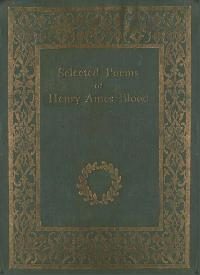
Cover of The Selected Poems of Henry Ames Blood, 1901

Dates are of first publication if known; an "a." before a date indicates the poem appeared in an anthology or collection of that date (original publication was likely earlier); an asterisk indicates the piece was collected in Blood's Selected Poems.

- Selected Poems of Henry Ames Blood (collection, 1901) (Google Books e-text) (Internet Archive e-text)
- "At the Door" (ca. 1860)
- "The Chimney-nook" * (The Home Journal, May 5, 1860)
- "Pro Mortuis" * (New York Post, Jul. 15, 1862)
- "Sighs in the South" * (New York Weekly Tribune, Oct. 13, 1862)
- "May Flowers" * (New York Weekly Tribune, Apr. 26, 1863)
- "The Sale of the Picture" (Dollar Monthly Magazine, Jul. 1863)
- "The Last War of the Dryads" * (Knickerbocker Magazine, Jul. 1863)
- "Fantasie" * (Knickerbocker Magazine, [Jan. 1864)
- "The Masque in Fantasie" * (Knickerbocker Magazine, Feb. 1864)
- "The Astrologers" (Flag of Our Union, Jan. 7, 1865)
- "The Death of the Old Year" * (The Independent, Dec. 28, 1871)
- "The Grand Orchestra" * (The Independent, Jan. 11, 1872)
- "The Departure of the Gods from Greece" (The Independent, Mar. 28, 1872)
- "The Song of the Savoyards" * (Scribner's Monthly, Jun. 1875)
- "Jeannette" * (Harper's Weekly, May 19, 1879)
- "The Invisible Piper" * (a.1882)
- "Yearnings" * (a.1882)
- "The Two Enchantments" * (The Century Magazine, Jan. 1883)
- "The Rock in the Sea" * (The Century Magazine, Sep. 1883)
- "Webster" * (New York Observer, Jun. 17, 1886)
- "At the Grave: In Memory of A.M." * (The Century Magazine, Feb. 1887)
- "Comrades" * (The Century Magazine, Dec. 1887)
- "Ad Astra" * (The Century Magazine, Dec. 1888)
- "Old Friends" * (Boston Advertiser, Nov. 15, 1889)
- "The Fighting Parson" * (The Century Magazine, May 1890)
- "Margie" * (Youth's Companion, May 21, 1891)
- "The Drummer" * (The Century Magazine, Jul. 1891)
- "Thoreau: In Memoriam" * (AKA "From a Poem on Thoreau," Library of the World's Best Literature, a.1896)
- "Shakespeare" * (New York Tribune, date unknown (a.1891))
- "The Byles Girls" (The New England Magazine, Aug. 1897)
- "Great Expectations of the House of Dock" (a.1897)
- "The Last Visitor" * (a.1895)
- "The Fairy Boat" * (a.1901)
- "A Midnight Chorus" * (a.1901)
- "The Serene Message" * (The Century Magazine, date unknown (a.1901))
- "Saint Goethe's Night" * (a.1901)
