= Katie Daffan =

American author and Confederate sympathizer (1874–1951)

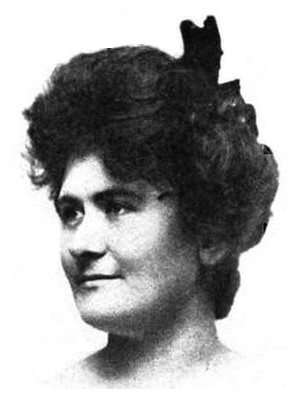
- Daffan in 1917
- Born: July 29, 1874; Brenham, Texas, U.S.
- Died: May 22, 1951 (aged 76); Ennis, Texas, U.S.
- Education: Hollins University
- Occupation: Author
- Spouse: Mann Trice

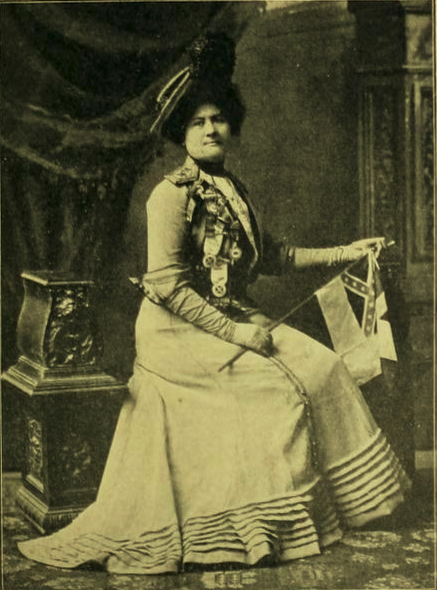
1905

Katie Litty Daffan (July 29, 1874 – May 22, 1951) was an American newspaper columnist and author.

A sympathizer of the Confederacy, Daffan was president of the Texas division of the United Daughters of the Confederacy. She helped organize reunions of the Texas Brigade, a brigade of the Confederate States Army.

== Books ==
- New Orleans (1906)
- Woman in History (1908)
- My Father as I Remember Him (1908)
- The Woman on Pine Springs Road (1910)
- As Thinketh a Woman (1911), poems
- Texas Hero Stories (1912)
- History of the United States (1924)
- Texas Heros (1924)
