= Robert Hamill Nassau =

American missionary

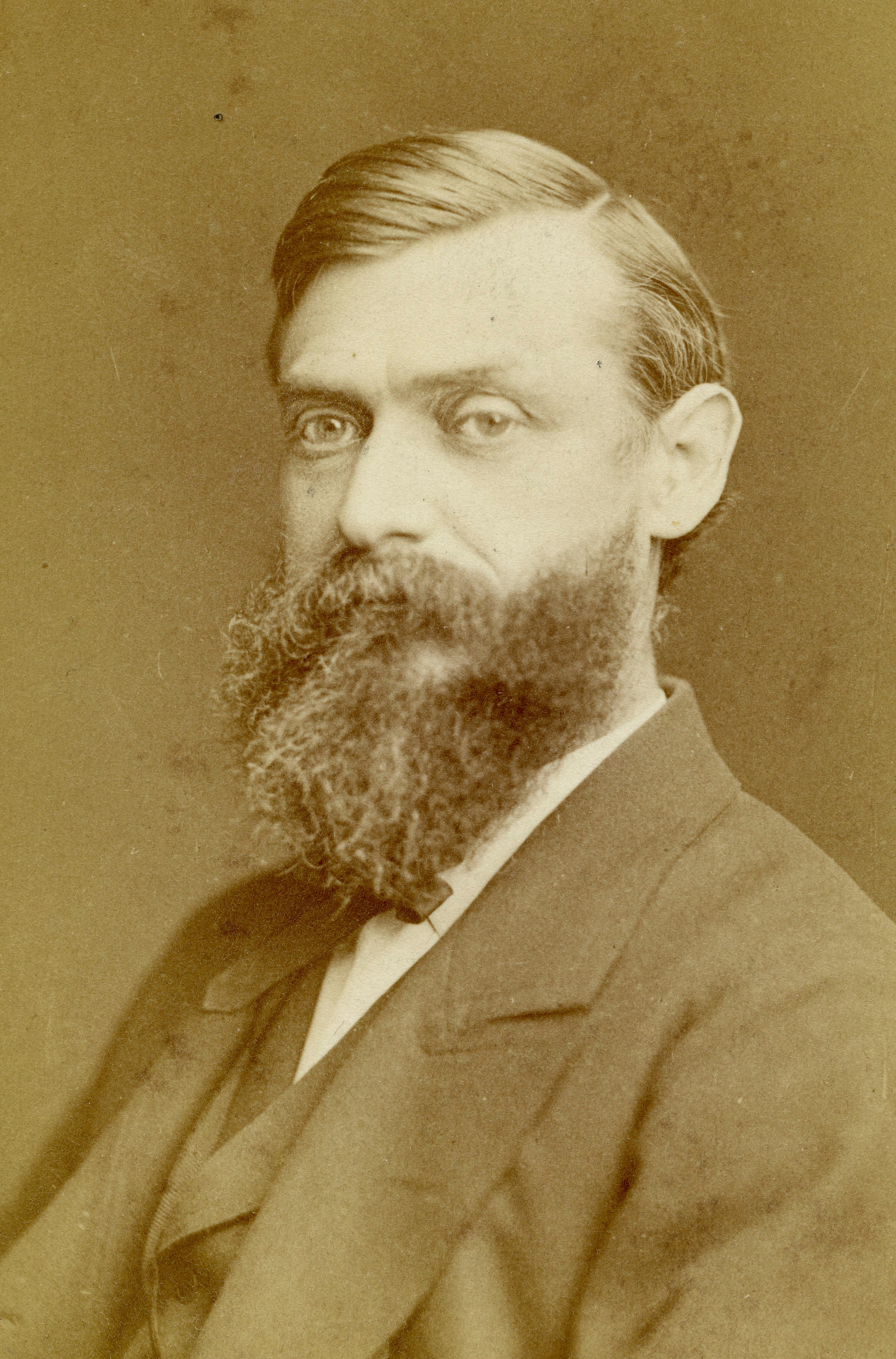
- In 1874
- Born: 1835; Montgomery Square, Pennsylvania
- Died: May 6, 1921 (aged 85); Ambler, Pennsylvania
- Occupation: Missionary

Robert Hamill Nassau (1835 – May 6, 1921) was an American presbyterian missionary who spent forty years in Africa.

== Early life and studies ==
Nassau was born in Montgomery Square, Pennsylvania and went to the Lawrenceville School in Lawrenceville, New Jersey, continuing his education at the College of New Jersey. From 1856 to 1859 he moved on to the Princeton Theological Seminary and obtained a medical qualification from Pennsylvania Medical School in 1861.

== Career ==
On the instigation of the Presbytery of New Brunswick he joined the Presbyterian Board of Foreign Missions as a missionary, with his first posting being to the African island of Corisco. Throughout his career he served as a missionary in many places: Benita; Belambla; Kangwe; Talaguga; Baraka (Libreville); and Batanga. Nassau established a mission station in Lambaréné.

He returned to the USA in 1906 and settled in Florida.

== Personal life ==
Nassau's first wife was Mary Cloyd Latta, a fellow missionary who died on Corisco in 1870. They had three sons William Latta, George Paull and Charles Francis His second wife was Mary Brunette Foster (died 1884), with whom he had a daughter Mary Brunette Foster.

== Death ==
Robert Hamill Nassau died in Ambler, Pennsylvania on May 6, 1921.

== Legacy ==
His papers are kept as part of the Burke Library Archives, held at the Columbia University Libraries, New York.

== Publications ==
- Where Animals Talk: West Africa Folk Lore Tales (1900)
- Fetichism in West Africa (1904)
- In An Elephant Corral (and Other Tales of West African Experiences) (1912)
